= No. 15 Group RAF =

Former Royal Air Force operations group

No. 15 (Reconnaissance) Group RAF ~~No. 15 (Aegean) Group~~ ~~No. 15 (Equipment) Group~~
- Royal Air Force Ensign
- Active: 1 April 1918 – 1 September 1919; 15 March 1939 – 1 August 1945
- Country: United Kingdom
- Branch: Royal Air Force
- Type: Royal Air Force group
- Role: Maritime Reconnaissance (1939-1945)
- Part of: RAF Coastal Command
- Mottos: Dion's Buail (Gaelic: "Protect and Attack")
- Engagements: World War II: European theatre of World War II; Battle of the Atlantic

Commanders
- Notable commanders: Air Marshal Sir Leonard Horatio Slatter KBE, CB, DSC & Bar, DFC, DL

No. 15 Group (15 Gp) was a group of the Royal Air Force, which disbanded in 1945. It was operational in the last year of, and just after, the First World War, a reformation saw it active throughout the Second World War.

== History ==
=== First World War ===
No. 15 Group was first formed on 1 April 1918 as No. 15 (Equipment) Group in the No. 3 Area, which became the Midland Area on 8 May 1918. It was disbanded, and then reformed on 27 September 1918 as No. 15 (Aegean) Group to control 62 and 63 Wings, until finally disbanded on 1 September 1919.

=== Second World War ===
==== Early War ====
The group was reformed on 15 March 1939 as No. 15 (Reconnaissance) Group, part of RAF Coastal Command, at Lee-on-Solent. It comprised Royal Air Force squadrons, with attached Naval Air Squadrons from the Royal Navy's Fleet Air Arm, operating under Royal Air Force control. No. 15 Group relocated its headquarters to Mount Wise, Plymouth, on 6 June 1939. By November 1939, No. 15 Group, under Air Commodore Rey Griffith Parry, DSO, had expanded to ten units operating across six Royal Air Force stations. It had three squadrons equipped with Short Sunderland flying boat patrol bomber. Two, Nos. 210 and 228 Squadrons, were stationed at RAF Pembroke Dock, in Pembrokeshire, Wales, with the third squadron, No. 204, operating out of RAF Mount Batten, in Devon, England. The group had two units operating with Avro Anson, a twin-engined multi-role aircraft, across four stations, No. 502 Squadron, was based at RAF Aldergrove, in Northern Ireland and which also had a detachment at RAF Hooton Park, in Cheshire, England, and No. 217 Squadron, based at RAF St Eval, in Cornwall, England, which also operated a flight out of RAF Carew Cheriton, situated in Pembrokeshire, Wales. No. 3 and No. 5 Coastal Patrol Flights, both equipped with de Havilland Tiger Moth, a biplane trainer aircraft, and de Havilland Hornet Moth, a cabin biplane, were based at RAF Hooton Park and RAF Carew Cheriton respectively.

The following year, in August 1940, the headquarters moved to Egg Buckland Keep, and a final move in early 1941 saw it transfer to Derby House, Liverpool, co-located with the Navy's Commander-in-Chief, Western Approaches. Its squadrons provided support and convoy escorts, maritime reconnaissance and anti-submarine warfare in the South West, Western Approaches and the Irish Sea. Air Vice-Marshal James Robb was appointed Air Officer Commanding, replacing Air Commodore Rey Griffith Parry, on 23 February 1941.

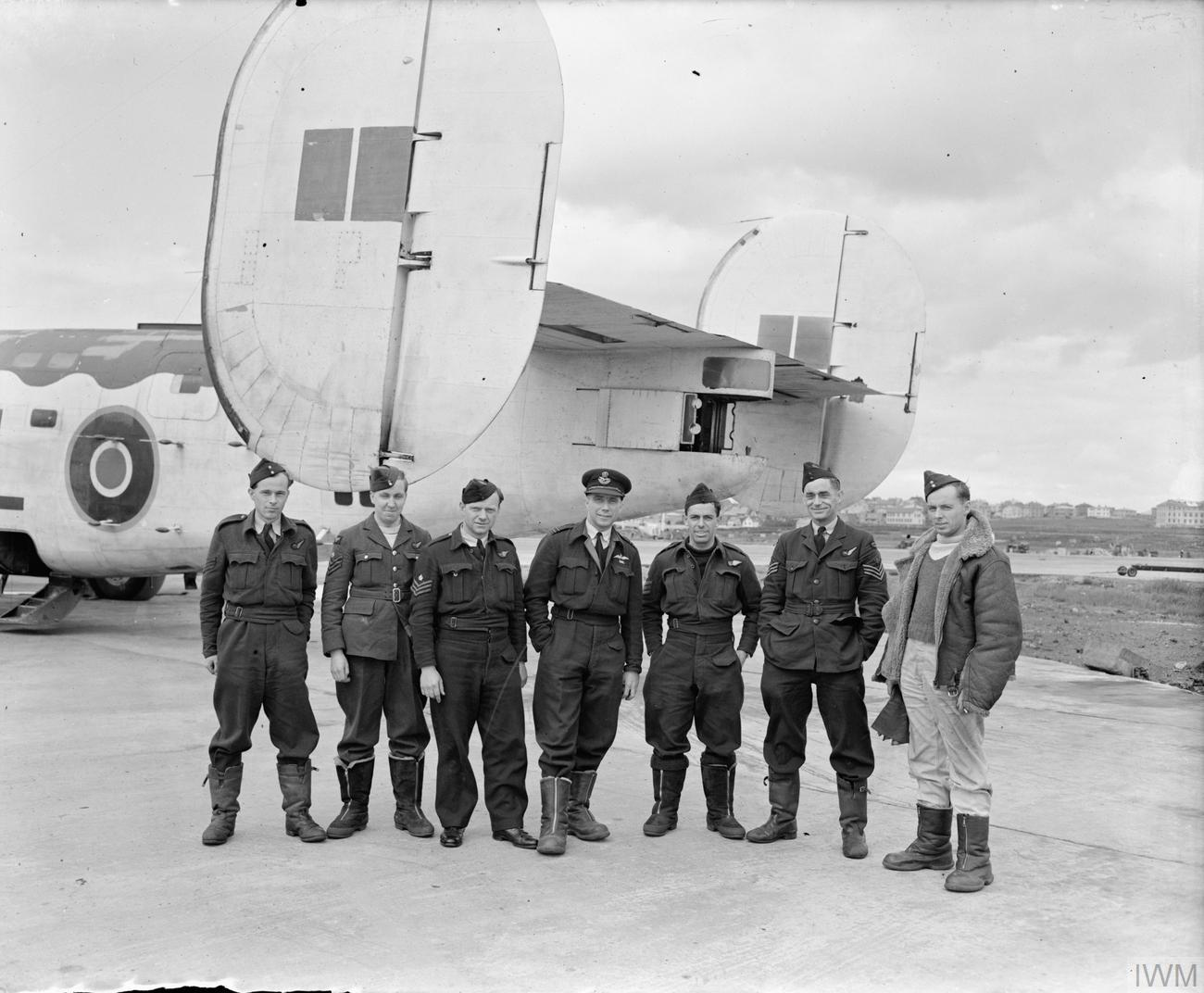
Flight Lieutenant A W Fraser and his crew, stand in front of their Consolidated Liberator Mark I, AM929 'H', of No. 120 Squadron RAF, at Reykjavik, Iceland, after sinking the German type IXD2 submarine U-200 on 24 June 1943

On 9 April 1941 it took control of Royal Air Force units in Iceland. It continued to operate from Liverpool for the rest of the Second World War. By May 1941, No. 210 Squadron had moved to RAF Oban, located in Argyll and Bute, Scotland. It operated with Short Sunderland but was re-equipping to Consolidated Catalina. No. 502 Squadron was now operating with Armstrong Whitworth Whitley, a medium bomber, and was based alongside No. 211 Squadron, equipped with Vickers Wellington, a long-range medium bomber, at RAF Limavady, near the city of Derry, Northern Ireland. At RAF Lough Erne, in County Fermanagh, Northern Ireland, Nos. 209 and 240 Squadrons both operated with Consolidated Catalina, but were also equipped with Saunders-Roe Lerwick and Supermarine Stranraer respectively. No. 119 Squadron had reformed at RAF Bowmore, Strathclyde, Scotland, on 13 March 1941 as part of No. 15 Group. The squadron was equipped with three Short G class and two Short C class flying boats. RAF Hooton Park was home to the Group Communications Flight, which operated various types and marks of aircraft, and also home to a No. 48 Squadron flight which was formed of Avro Anson. The squadron also had a similar flight at RAF Port Ellen, on the island of Islay in Argyll and Bute. RAF Aldergrove was home to No. 233 Squadron, equipped with Lockheed Hudson and No. 252 Squadron which operated with Bristol Beaufighter.

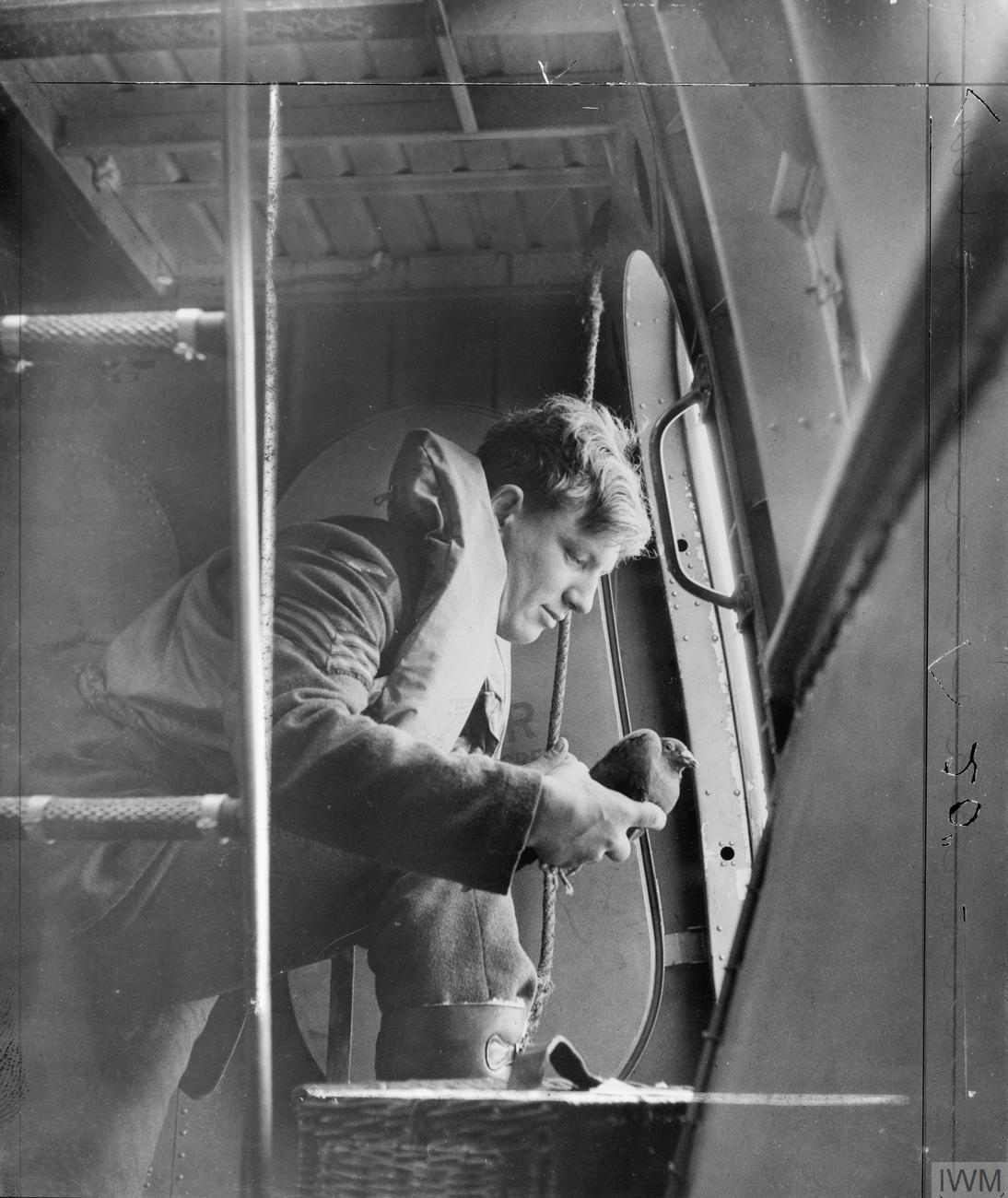
An aircrew sergeant of No. 209 Squadron RAF about to launch a carrier pigeon from the side hatch of a Saro Lerwick flying boat

On 4 April 1942, Air Vice-Marshal Douglas Colyer become the new Air Officer Commanding for No. 15 Group. Around this time the Group Communications Flight continued at RAF Hooton Park. The Coastal Command Development Unit RAF, which was set up to undertook service trials of all radar equipment, was operating under No. 15 Group and the unit was working out of RAF Ballykelly, located in County Londonderry, Northern Ireland. RAF Aldergrove was home to four of No. 15 Groups units: No. 206 Squadron, equipped with Lockheed Hudson, No. 143 Squadron, which operated with Bristol Beaufighter, No. 1402 (Meteorological) Flight, which used Supermarine Spitfire, Lockheed Hudson and Gloster Gladiator, and No. 1 Armament Practice Camp, which had formed out of No. 15 Group Armament Practice Camp on 5 November 1941 and was equipped with various aircraft including Westland Lysander, an army co-operation and liaison aircraft.

No. 224 Squadron, which operated with Lockheed Hudson, was based at RAF Limavady. No. 15 Group was now down to two Short Sunderland squadrons, No. 228 Squadron, based at RAF Stornoway, on the Isle of Lewis, in the Western Isles of Scotland, and No. 201 Squadron based in Northern Ireland, at RAF Lough Erne, which was also home to No. 240 Squadron, which was equipped with Consolidated Catalina. Also in Northern Ireland were Nos. 120 and 220 Squadrons, which operated from RAF Nutts Corner, in County Antrim and were equipped with Consolidated Liberator and Boeing Fortress, both types being American four-engined heavy bomber aircraft, respectively.

==== Mid and later war ====
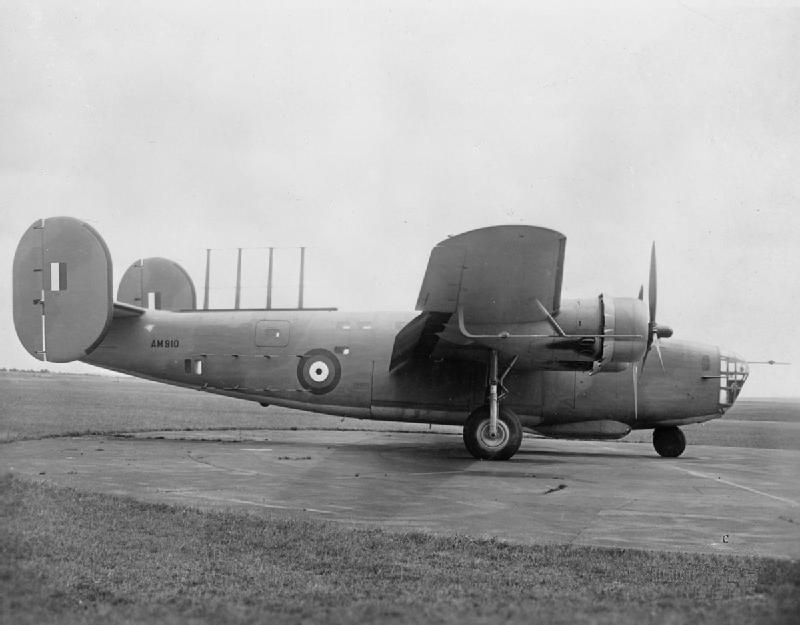
A Royal Air Force Liberator Mark I (serial AM910) on the ground following conversion as an anti-submarine aircraft by Scottish Aviation Ltd, AM910 joined 120 Squadron at Nutts Corner, County Antrim, Northern Ireland as "OH-M"

One year later, by April 1943, Air Vice-Marshal Leonard Slatter was in command of the group. The Group Communications Flight had by this time relocated to RAF Speke, located in Liverpool. No. 15 Group now controlled five squadrons of Short Sunderland flying boats. Three squadrons, 201, 228 and 423 operated out of RAF Castle Archdale (previously known as RAF Lough Erne). No. 246 Squadron which was based at RAF Port Ellen, and No. 330 Squadron which was at RAF Oban. Also at Oban was No. 422 Squadron which was controlled by No. 15 Group and equipped with Consolidated Catalina. No. 15 Group had two Boeing Fortress units, both were based at RAF Benbecula, on the island of Benbecula in the Outer Hebrides, in Scotland, with Nos. 206 and 220 Squadrons. RAF Aldergrove was home to three units with No. 1 Armament Practice Camp, No. 1402 (Meteorological) Flight, equipped with Gloster Gladiator, Supermarine Spitfire and Handley Page Hampden, a medium bomber, and No. 120 Squadron, which operated with Consolidated Liberator. At RAF Ballykelly, No. 280 Squadron operated a detachment of Avro Anson.

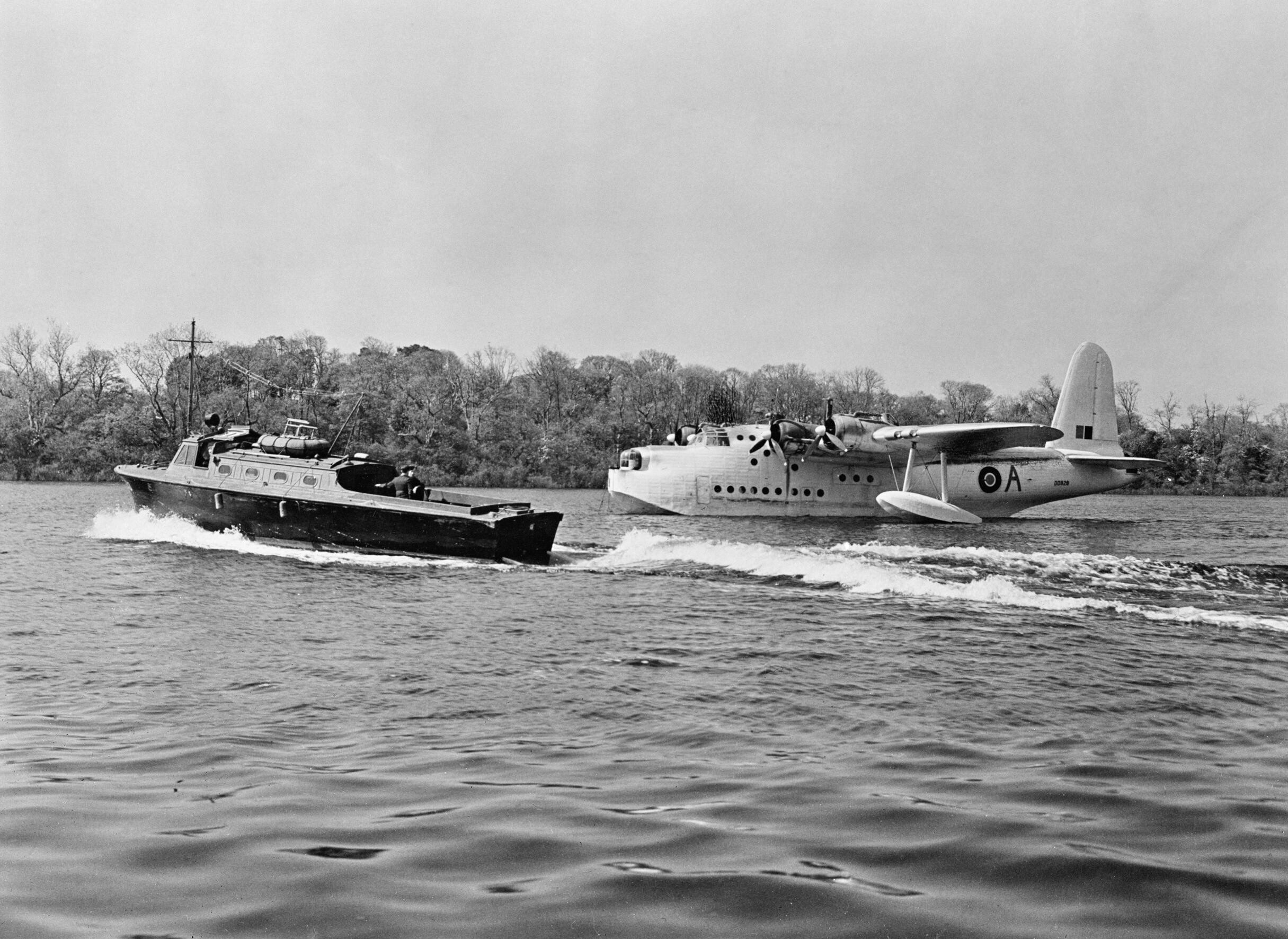
Castle Archdale (formerly Logh Erne) in Northern Ireland on 20 May 1943, as a seaplane tender passes a Sunderland of No 201 Squadron

Around July 1944, No. 15 Group had reduced in size and consisted of nine units on five RAF stations, including the Group Communications Flight at RAF Speke. RAF Aldergrove was home to the meteorological flight and No. 1 Armament Practice Camp. It was now back to just two Short Sunderland squadrons which were based at RAF Castle Archdale, these were the RCAF 422 and 423 Squadrons. The group had two Liberator squadrons, 59 and 120, which were operating from RAF Ballykelly. In Scotland, RAF Tiree on the island of Tiree in the Inner Hebrides, was home to 518 Squadron which was equipped with Handley Page Halifaxes, a four-engined heavy bomber and 281 Squadron with the Vickers Warwick, a maritime reconnaissance, air-sea rescue and transport aircraft.

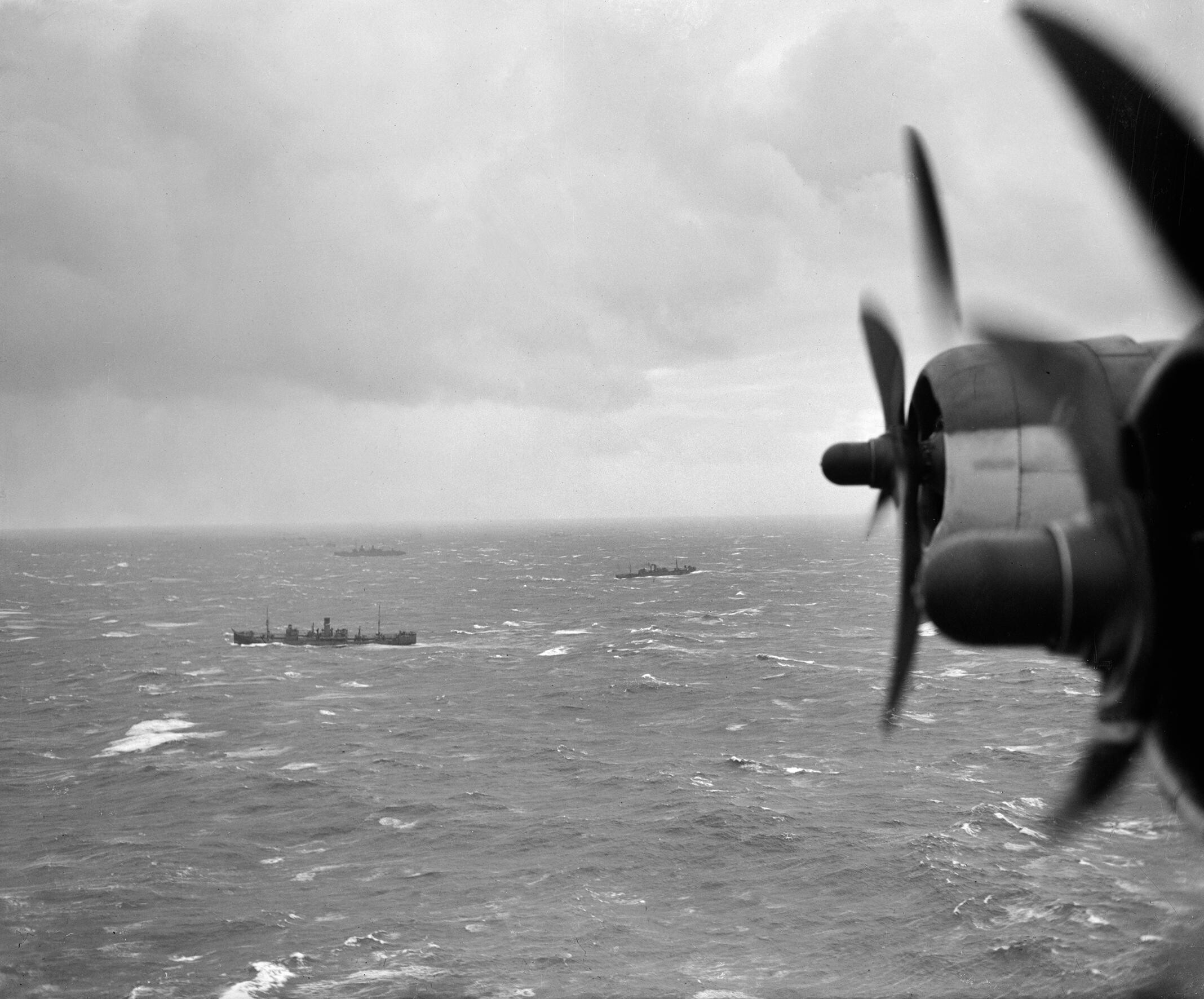
A convoy seen from 'X for X-Ray', a No 120 Squadron Liberator based at Aldergrove. The aircraft made contact after a flight of several hours at low-level to avoid icing conditions in the clouds. For a further three hours it patrolled out to the front and rear of the convoy, also keeping an eye on stragglers, but there was no sign of any U-boats

Air Commodore Norman Pritchett had been appointed Air Officer commanding for No. 15 Group, during June 1945 and by July it was in control of seven units across seven RAF stations. RAF Speke remained home to the Group Communications Flight. The group controlled No. 518 Squadron, equipped with Handley Page Halifax and based at RAF Tiree. Also at Tiree was a detachment from No. 281 Squadron providing air sea rescue, using both Vickers Warwick, and Supermarine Sea Otter, an amphibious aircraft. The squadron also had a similar detachment at RAF Valley, on the island of Anglesey, Wales. The remainder of the group’s assets were based within Northern Ireland. No. 1 Armament Practice Camp remained at RAF Aldergrove. The group controlled No. 1402 (Meteorological) Flight, which used Supermarine Spitfire and Hawker Hurricane and operated out of RAF Ballyhalbert, situated in County Down, and No. 201 Squadron, equipped with Short Sunderland, at RAF Castle Archdale. No. 281 Squadron was based at RAF Limavady, providing air sea rescue like its detachments. Also at Limavady, as part of No. 15 Group, was the Coastal Command Anti U-Boat Devices School RAF, which had previously existed under different identities since 1940, and was equipped with Vickers Wellington VIII.

No. 15 Group disbanded on 1 August 1945 and was absorbed into RAF Northern Ireland.

=== 15 Group Communications Flight ===
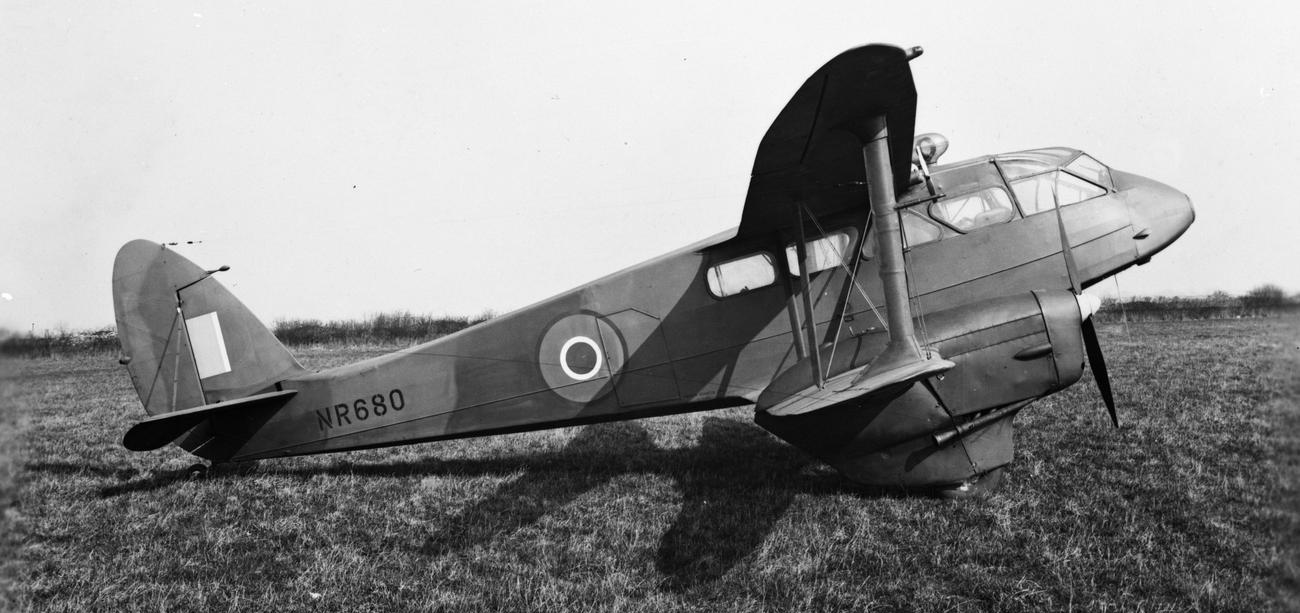
de Havilland Dominie, Communications and transport aircraft, an example of the type used by 15 GCF

No. 15 Group Communications Flight RAF (15 GCF) formed at RAF Roborough located in Devon, on 13 June 1939, it moved to RAF Hooton Park on 1 February 1941 by April 1943, the Flight had relocated to RAF Speke. It operated various types and marks of aircraft:

- Miles Mentor I, training and communications aircraft
- Miles Magister, basic trainer aircraft
- Avro Anson I, multi-role aircraft
- Airspeed Envoy 3, light transport aircraft
- Percival Petrel, military communications aircraft
- Percival Proctor I, trainer and communications aircraft
- D.H.98A, light transport biplane
- de Havilland Dominie, Communications and transport aircraft
- Percival Vega Gull, military trainer and communications aircraft
- Airspeed Oxford I, II, trainer aircraft
- de Havilland Tiger Moth I, biplane trainer aircraft
- General Aircraft Monospar ST-25, utility aircraft
- Hawker Hurricane IIC, single-seat fighter aircraft
- de Havilland Dragonfly, light transport aircraft

It disbanded at RAF Speke on 1 August 1945.

== Structure ==
The following stations and squadrons operated for or as part of No. 15 Group, during the Second World War.

Royal Air Force

Listed as Order of Battle on specific dates during the Second World War:

Order of Battle, 3 September 1939

Station	Squadron	Aircraft
RAF Aldergrove	No. 502 Squadron	Avro Anson, multi-role aircraft
RAF Mount Batten	No. 204 Squadron	Short Sunderland, flying boat patrol bomber
RAF Pembroke Dock	No. 210 Squadron	Short Sunderland, flying boat patrol bomber
RAF Pembroke Dock	No. 228 Squadron	Short Sunderland, flying boat patrol bomber
RAF Warmwell	No. 217 Squadron	Avro Anson, multi-role aircraft

Order of Battle, 1 November 1940

Station	Squadron	Aircraft
RAF Aldergrove	No. 502 Squadron	Botha, reconnaissance and torpedo bomber, Whitley, medium bomber
RAF Carew Cheriton	No. 321 Squadron	Avro Anson, multi-role aircraft
RAF Hooton Park	No. 48 Squadron	Avro Anson, multi-role aircraft
RAF Pembroke Dock	No. 10 Squadron RAAF	Short Sunderland, flying boat patrol bomber
RAF Pembroke Dock	No. 209 Squadron	Saro Lerwick, medium-range flying boat
RAF St Eval	No. 217 Squadron	Avro Anson, multi-role aircraft / Bristol Beaufort, torpedo bomber
RAF St Eval	No. 236 Squadron	Bristol Blenheim, light bomber

Order of Battle, 12 February 1942

Station	Squadron	Aircraft
RAF Aldergrove	No. 143 Squadron	Bristol Blenheim, light bomber
RAF Aldergrove	No. 206 Squadron	Lockheed Hudson, light bomber and maritime patrol aircraft
RAF Aldergrove	No. 1402 (Meteorological) Flight RAF	Supermarine Spitfire, fighter aircraft / Gloster Gladiator, biplane fighter aircraft
RAF Aldergrove	No. 1405 (Meteorological) Flight RAF	Bristol Blenheim, light bomber / Lockheed Hudson, light bomber and maritime patrol aircraft
RAF Limavady	No. 53 Squadron	Lockheed Hudson, light bomber and maritime patrol aircraft
RAF Lough Erne	No. 201 Squadron	Short Sunderland, flying boat patrol bomber
RAF Lough Erne	No. 240 Squadron	Consolidated Catalina, Maritime patrol aircraft and search and rescue seaplane
RAF Nutts Corner	No. 120 Squadron	Consolidated Liberator, four-engined heavy bomber
RAF Nutts Corner	No. 220 Squadron	Boeing Fortress, four-engined heavy bomber
RAF Oban	No. 210 Squadron	Consolidated Catalina, maritime patrol aircraft and search and rescue seaplane
RAF Stranraer	No. 228 Squadron	Short Sunderland, flying boat patrol bomber

Order of Battle, 15 February 1943

Station	Squadron	Aircraft
RAF Aldergrove	No. 120 Squadron	Consolidated Liberator, four-engined heavy bomber
RAF Aldergrove	No. 220 Squadron	Boeing Fortress, four-engined heavy bomber
RAF Aldergrove	No. 1402 (Meteorological) Flight RAF	Supermarine Spitfire, fighter aircraft / Gloster Gladiator, biplane fighter aircraft
RAF Benbecula	No. 206 Squadron	Boeing Fortress, four-engined heavy bomber
RAF Bowmore	No. 246 Squadron	Short Sunderland, flying boat patrol bomber
RAF Castle Archdale (RAF Lough Erne)	No. 201 Squadron	Short Sunderland, flying boat patrol bomber
RAF Castle Archdale (RAF Lough Erne)	No. 228 Squadron	Short Sunderland, flying boat patrol bomber
RAF Castle Archdale (RAF Lough Erne)	No. 423 Squadron RCAF	Short Sunderland, flying boat patrol bomber
RAF Oban	No. 422 Squadron RCAF	Short Sunderland, flying boat patrol bomber

Order of Battle, 6 June 1944

Station	Squadron	Aircraft
RAF Aldergrove	No. 1402 (Meteorological) Flight RAF	Supermarine Spitfire, fighter aircraft / Gloster Gladiator, biplane fighter aircraft
RAF Ballykelly	No. 59 Squadron	Consolidated Liberator, four-engined heavy bomber
RAF Ballykelly	No. 120 Squadron	Consolidated Liberator, four-engined heavy bomber
RAF Castle Archdale	No. 422 Squadron RCAF	Short Sunderland, flying boat patrol bomber
RAF Castle Archdale	No. 423 Squadron RCAF	Short Sunderland, flying boat patrol bomber
RAF Tiree	No. 281 Squadron	Vickers Warwick (ASR), Maritime reconnaissance, air-sea rescue and transport aircraft
RAF Tiree	No. 518 Squadron	Handley Page Halifax (Met), four-engined heavy bomber

Royal Navy

A number of Fleet Air Arm squadrons were also attached to No. 15 Group, usually on a short-term basis:

Fleet Air Arm
Station	Squadron	Aircraft	Dates
RAF Benbecula	838 Naval Air Squadron	Fairey Swordfish II, biplane torpedo bomber	September 1944 – November 1944
RAF Benbecula	842 Naval Air Squadron	Fairey Swordfish II, biplane torpedo bomber	September 1944 – November 1944
RAF Dallachy	838 Naval Air Squadron	Fairey Swordfish II, biplane torpedo bomber	September 1944 – November 1944
RAF Fraserburgh	838 Naval Air Squadron	Fairey Swordfish II, biplane torpedo bomber	September 1944 – November 1944
RAF Limavady	811 Naval Air Squadron	Fairey Swordfish II, biplane torpedo bomber	June 1944 – September 1944
RAF Limavady	825 Naval Air Squadron	Fairey Swordfish III, biplane torpedo bomber	August 1944 – December 1944
RAF Mullaghmore	825 Naval Air Squadron	Fairey Swordfish III, biplane torpedo bomber	August 1944 – Dec 1944
RAF Mullaghmore	842 Naval Air Squadron	Fairey Swordfish II, biplane torpedo bomber	September 1944 – November 1944
RAF Port Ellen	890 Naval Air Squadron	Grumman F4F Wildcat V, an American carrier-based fighter aircraft	October 1943 – December 1943
RAF St Eval	812 Naval Air Squadron	Fairey Swordfish I, biplane torpedo bomber	November 1940 – December 1940
RAF St Eval	816 Naval Air Squadron	Fairey Swordfish I, biplane torpedo bomber	April 1941 – May 1941
RAF St Eval	827 Naval Air Squadron	Fairey Albacore, a single-engine biplane torpedo bomber	May 1941 – June 1941
RAF St Eval	829 Naval Air Squadron	Fairey Albacore, a single-engine biplane torpedo bomber	September 1940 – November 1940
RAF St Eval	849 Naval Air Squadron	Grumman TBF Avenger I, II, an American torpedo bomber	August 1944
RNAS St Merryn	829 Naval Air Squadron	Fairey Albacore, a single-engine biplane torpedo bomber	September 1940 – November 1940
RAF Stornoway	825 Naval Air Squadron	Fairey Swordfish III, biplane torpedo bomber	August 1944 – December 1944

== Air Officers Commanding ==
Note: The ranks shown are the ranks held at the time of holding the appointment of Air Officer Commanding, No. 15 Group Royal Air Force.

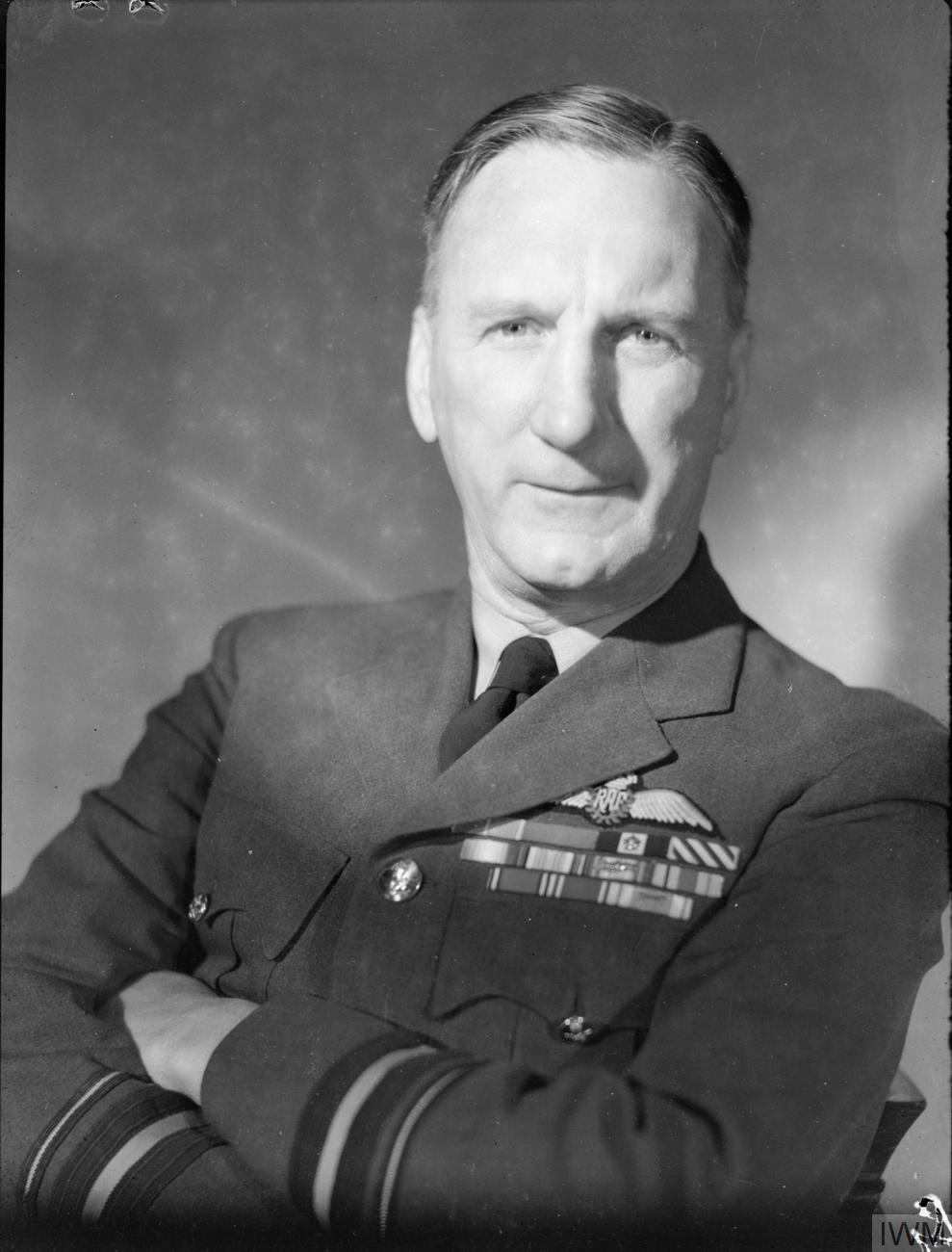
Air Vice Marshal Sir Leonard Slatter, Air Officer Commanding No. 15 Group

No. 15 Group commanding officers
Rank	name	from
Group Captain	G. H. Boyce	March 1939
Air Commodore	Rey Griffith Parry	June 1939
Air Vice-Marshal	James Robb	February 1941
Air Vice-Marshal	Douglas Colyer	April 1942
Air Vice-Marshal	Thomas Langford-Sainsbury	November 1942
Air Vice-Marshal	Leonard Slatter	February 1943
Air Commodore	Norman Anthony Pelynt Pritchett	June 1945

== See also ==
- List of Royal Air Force groups
- RAF Coastal Command
- RAF Coastal Command during World War II
- RAF Coastal Command order of battle during World War II
