= RAF Oban =

Former Royal Air Force flying boat base in Argyll and Bute, Scotland

RAF Oban
- Oban, Argyll and Bute in Scotland
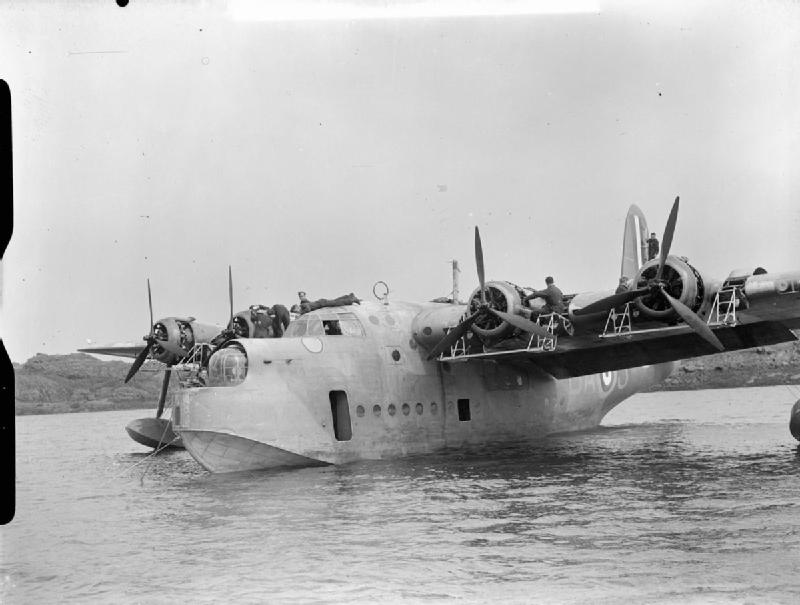
- A Short Sunderland Mark I of No. 210 Squadron RAF undergoing maintenance just off the base.

Site information
- Type: Royal Air Force station
- Owner: Air Ministry
- Operator: Royal Air Force
- Controlled by: RAF Coastal Command

Location
- Shown on Kerrera Shown within Argyll and Bute RAF Oban (the United Kingdom)
- Coordinates: 56°25′06″N 5°29′50″W

Site history
- Built: 1940
- In use: 1940-1945
- Battles/wars: European theatre of World War II

RAF Oban is a former Royal Air Force (RAF) flying boat base located at the northern end of the island of Kerrera, in Ardantrive Bay west of Oban, Argyll and Bute, Scotland during the Second World War.

== History ==
Oban was surveyed by the RAF in the 1930s as a suitable base for flying boat operations. The slipway on the island of Kerrera was commandeered, and No. 209 Squadron RAF began utilising the facilities operating the Supermarine Stranraer flying-boat in October 1939. An aircraft servicing area, new slip and jetty were constructed on the island.

The base became operational in September 1938, with headquarters at Dungallan House, Oban. No. 209 Squadron re-equipped with Saro Lerwick flying-boats were based at RAF Oban. Aircrew based at RAF Oban were billeted in the main seafront hotels at Oban. No. 210 Squadron RAF equipped with the Short Sunderland replaced No. 209 Squadron in July 1940.

Anti submarine patrols, convoy escorts as part of 15 Group Coastal Command and ferry services were carried out from the base. No. 228 Squadron RAF, No. 10 Squadron Royal Australian Air Force, No. 422 and 423 Squadrons Royal Canadian Air Force, No. 330 (Norwegian) Squadron RAF.

No. 302 Ferry Training Unit RAF (July 1943 – April 1945) and No. 4 Flying Boat Servicing Unit RAF (September 1942 – 1945) served at the base. No. 524 Squadron formed at the base in October 1943 with Mariner Mk1 aircraft but disbanded in December of the same year.

A Flying Boat Maintenance Unit located to the north east at Ganavan provided maintenance for aircraft utilising the base. The base was reverted to care and maintenance on 28 April 1945.

== Commanding officers ==
- Group Captain J.H.O. Jones – September 1938.
- Group Captain J H Chaplin – December 1943.
