= RAF Bowmore =

Former Royal Air Force seaplane station in Argyll and Bute, Scotland

RAF Bowmore
- Bowmore, Argyll and Bute in Scotland

Site information
- Owner: Air Ministry
- Operator: Royal Air Force
- Controlled by: RAF Coastal Command

Location
- Shown within Islay RAF Bowmore (the United Kingdom)
- Coordinates: 55°45′26″N 6°17′17″W

Site history
- Built: 1940
- In use: 1940-1946
- Battles/wars: European theatre of World War II

Royal Air Force Bowmore or more simply RAF Bowmore is a former seaplane station located in Bowmore, Argyll and Bute, Scotland.

The following units were here at some point:

- No. 119 Squadron RAF reformed here on 13 March 1941 and operated Short S.26M and Short S.23M, Consolidated PBY Catalina IB until 4 August 1941
- No. 246 Squadron RAF reformed here on 5 August 1942 using Short Sunderland III's until 30 April 1943 when the squadron was disbanded
- No. 422 Squadron RCAF between 8 May 1943 and 3 November 1943 operating Sunderland III's
- ‘G’ Flight was disbanded here on 13 March 1941 and became No. 119 Squadron. The Flight operated S.23 and S.26's.
