= RAF Castle Archdale =

Former Royal Air Force station in County Fermanagh, Northern Ireland

RAF Castle Archdale RAF Lough Erne
- Near Lisnarrick, County Fermanagh in Northern Ireland
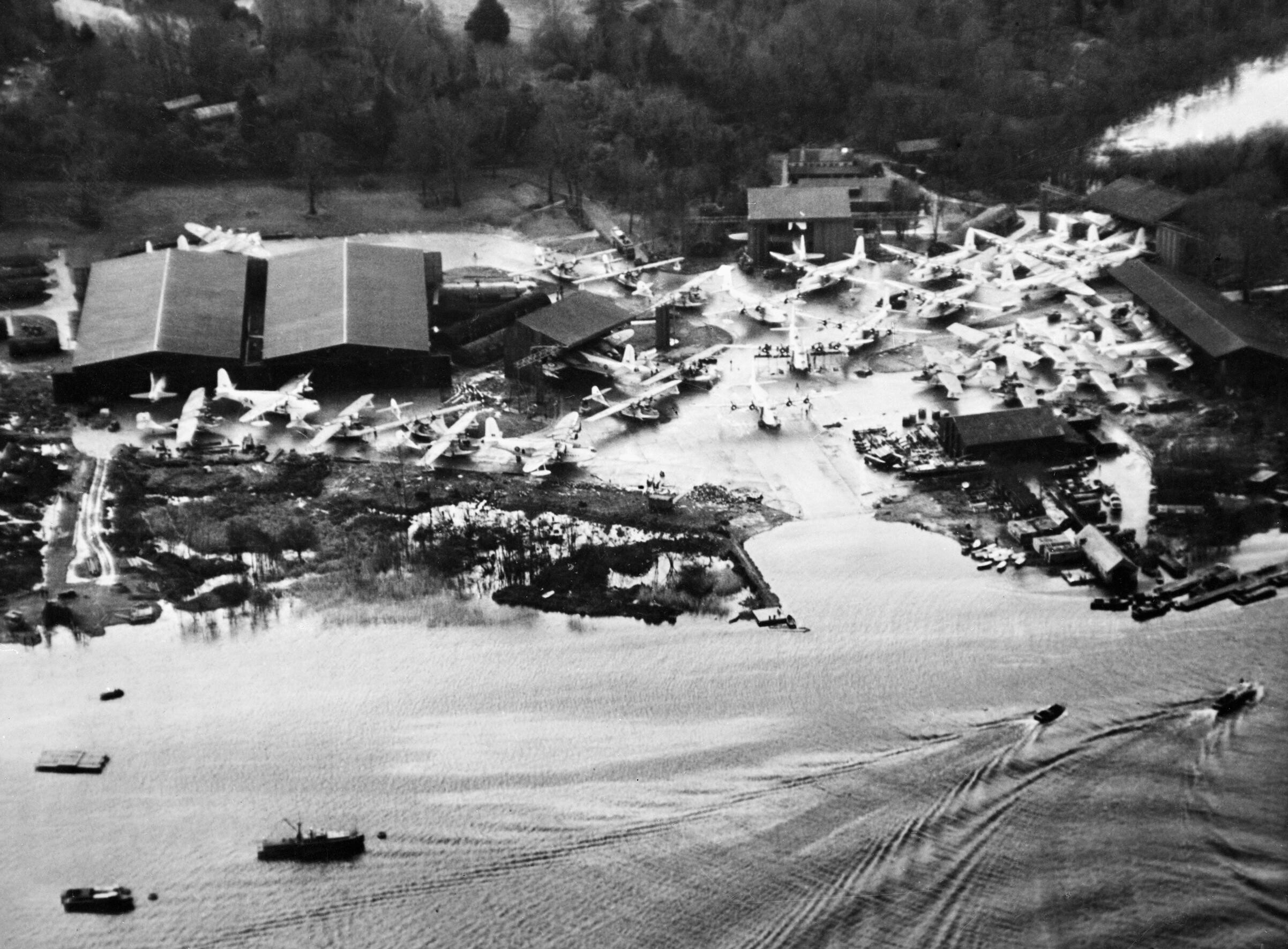
- Various flying boats are being hauled out of Lough Erne as the water begins to freeze in January 1945

Site information
- Type: Royal Air Force station
- Owner: Air Ministry
- Operator: Royal Air Force
- Controlled by: RAF Coastal Command * No. 15 (T) Group RAF

Location
- Shown within Northern Ireland RAF Castle Archdale (the United Kingdom)
- Coordinates: 54°28′50″N 7°43′37″W

Site history
- Built: 1940
- In use: February 1941 – 1958
- Battles/wars: European theatre of World War II

Airfield information
- Elevation: 138 feet (42 m) AMSL
- Other: Used Runways on Lough Erne

Royal Air Force Castle Archdale or more simply RAF Castle Archdale, also known for a while as RAF Lough Erne is a former Royal Air Force station used for flying boats by the RAF and the Royal Canadian Air Force in County Fermanagh, Northern Ireland.

== History ==
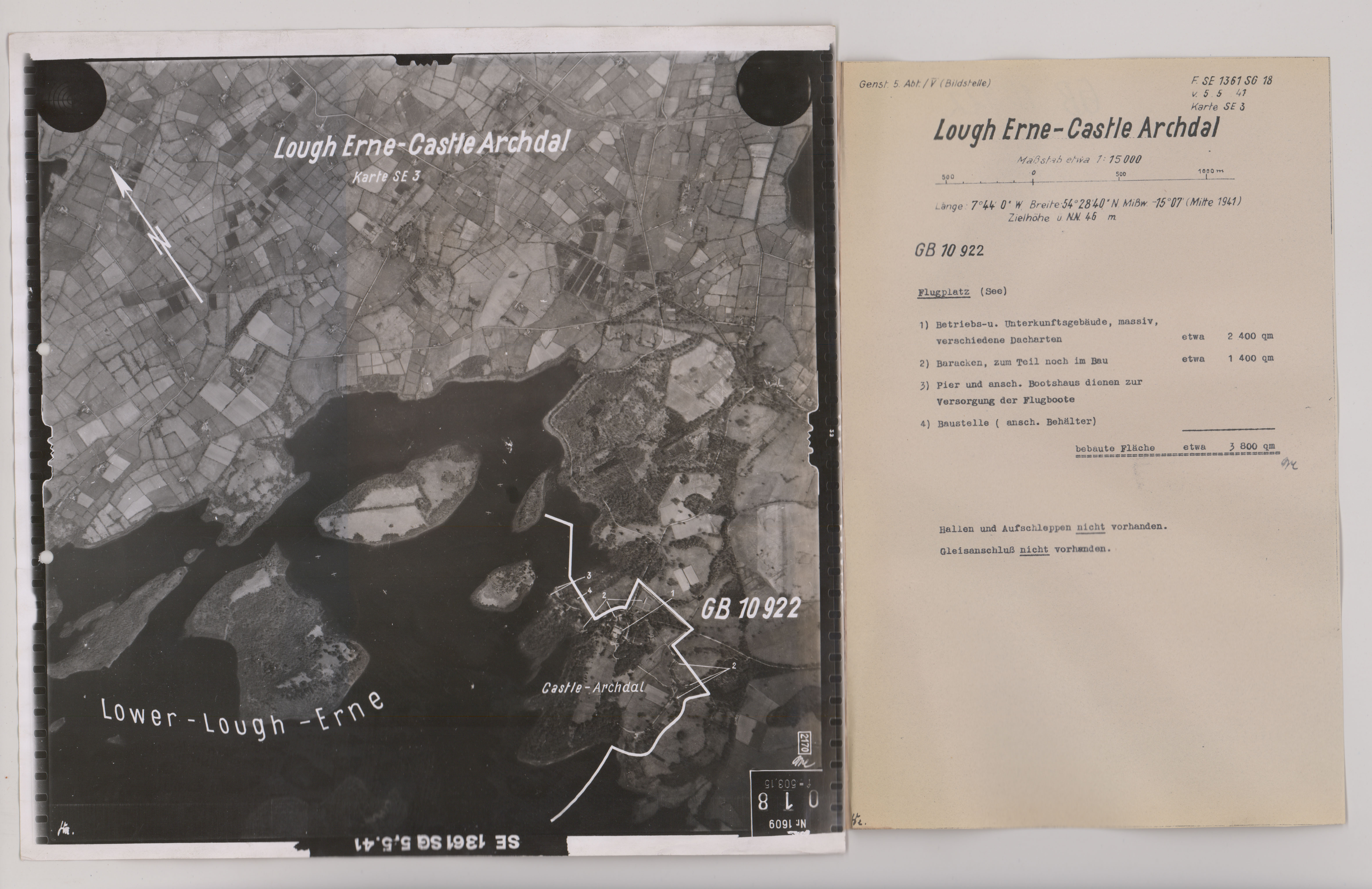
RAF Castle Archdale on a target dossier of the German Luftwaffe, 1941

RAF Castle Archdale was located on the eastern shore of Lower Lough Erne, near the village of Lisnarick and about five miles from Irvinestown. It was used during the Second World War by flying boats of No. 209 Squadron RAF. From Castle Archdale, Consolidated Catalinas and Short Sunderlands could patrol the North Atlantic for German U-boats. A secret agreement with the government of Ireland allowed aircraft to fly from Lough Erne to the Atlantic along the Donegal Corridor.

In May 1941 the German battleship Bismarck was found during a routine patrol by a Catalina flying out of Castle Archdale boat base on Lower Lough Erne, Northern Ireland.

RAF St Angelo and RAF Killadeas were also on the shores of Lough Erne, close by.

== Units ==
The following units were here at some point:

- No. 119 Squadron RAF between 16 April 1942 and 6 September with the Catalina IIIA
- No. 201 Squadron RAF initially between 9 October 1941 and 8 April 1944 with the Sunderland I, II & III, then again between 3 November 1944 and 2 August 1945 with the Sunderland III & V
- No. 202 Squadron RAF between 3 September 1944 and 4 June 1944 when it was disbanded using Catalina IB & IV
- No. 228 Squadron RAF between 11 December 1942 and 4 May 1943 using Sunderland I, II & III
- No. 230 Squadron RAF between 10 August 1946 and 16 September 1946 using Sunderland V
- No. 240 Squadron RAF as a detachment between July 1940 and 28 March 1941 using Stranraer and Catalina I
- No. 422 Squadron RCAF was formed here on 2 April 1942 with the Lerwick I and Catalina IB staying until 30 October 1942. The squadron returned between 13 April 1944 and 4 November 1944 with the Sunderland III
- No. 423 Squadron RCAF between 2 November 1942 and 8 August 1945 using the Sunderland II & III
- No. 302 Ferry Training Unit RAF (September – December 1942)
- No. 2707 Squadron RAF Regiment

== Postwar ==
A flag-lowering ceremony was conducted in late 1957, and the airfield finally closed on 31 January 1958.

Today, the base is part of Castle Archdale Country Park. The slipway remains in use and the concrete stands for parking the Catalina aircraft are now part of a caravan site. Other buildings lie derelict and overgrown in the surrounding forest. A museum in the park grounds has a section devoted to its role during the Second World War.

== See also ==
- List of former Royal Air Force stations
- Castle Archdale estate history.
