= No. 119 Squadron RAF =

Defunct flying squadron of the Royal Air Force

- Active: 1 Jan 1918 – 6 Dec 1918; 13 Mar 1941 – 17 Apr 1943; 19 Jul 1944 – 25 May 1945
- Country: United Kingdom
- Branch: Royal Air Force
- Motto(s): By night and day

Insignia
- Squadron Badge heraldry: A sword, the point downwards, and an anchor in saltire
- Squadron Codes: NH (Jul 1944 – May 1945)

No. 119 Squadron RAF was a squadron of the Royal Air Force (RAF), flying with Coastal Command during the Second World War. It was the only RAF unit flying the Short G class and Short C class flying boats.

== History ==
=== Formation in World War I ===
No. 119 Squadron was originally formed on 1 January 1918 at RAF Andover to become a day bomber unit. It flew various aircraft, including Airco DH.4s and Airco DH.9s in the working up period spent at RAF Duxford and later RAF Thetford, but failed to become operational and was disbanded at RAF Wyton on 6 December of the same year.

=== Reformation in World War II ===
==== On Flying boats ====
The squadron was reformed from 'G' flight at RAF Bowmore, Strathclyde on 13 March 1941, as part of No. 15 Group of Coastal Command. The unit was equipped with the three Short G class and two Short C class (Clio and Cordelia) flying boats, re-equipping with the Catalina Mk.Ib in June 1941. The squadron deployed to RAF Pembroke Dock on 4 August, becoming non-operational there for lack of serviceable aircraft until they moved to RAF Lough Erne on 19 April 1942, where they re-equipped with the Catalina Mk.IIIa the next month. In August they returned to Pembroke Dock, changing to Sunderland Mks.II and IIIs in September. The squadron was disbanded on 17 April 1943 at Pembroke Dock.

==== On biplanes ====
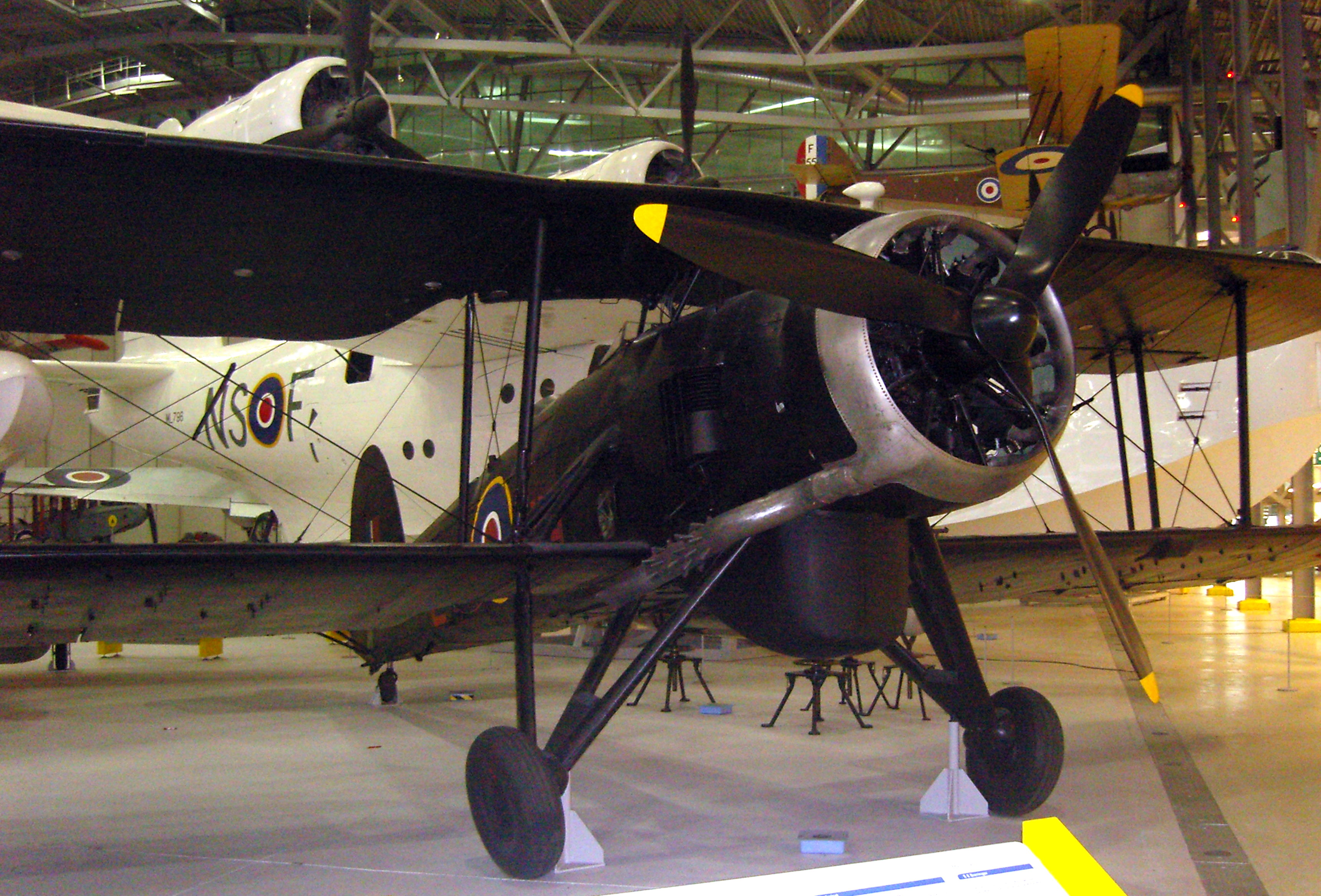
Swordfish NF370, Imperial War Museum, Duxford (2011)

On 19 July 1944 however, 119 Squadron was reformed by redesignation of a flight of No. 415 Squadron RCAF at RAF Manston, equipped with Albacore Mk.Is, taking over the aircraft as well as the squadron code, 'NH' (till this moment the aircraft of no. 119 sqn had only carried single-letter individual aircraft codes). They deployed to RAF Swingfield and (very briefly) RAF Beccles before being based at RAF Bircham Newton in September, flying anti-shipping patrols and hunting for German E-boats and R-boats. In October 1944 detachments of the squadron were sent to B.65/Maldeghem, B.63/St. Croix and B.83/Knocke-Het Zoute in Belgium and added German midget-submarines to its prey. In January 1945 they re-equipped with the ASV-equipped Swordfish Mk.III which aided in the hunt on midget-submarines, destroying three before their final mission was flown on 8 May 1945. The squadron disbanded at Bircham Newton on 25 May 1945.

One of the Swordfish flown by the squadron, Swordfish Mk.III, NF370 is preserved and displayed at the Imperial War Museum Duxford, painted in its original 119 Squadron markings.

== Aircraft operated ==
| From | To | Aircraft | Variant |
|---|---|---|---|
| Jan 1918 | Nov 1918 | Various | |
| Sep 1918 | Dec 1918 | Airco DH.9 | |
| Mar 1941 | Oct 1941 | Short G class | S.26/M |
| Apr 1941 | Aug 1941 | Short C class | S.23/M |
| Jun 1941 | Jul 1941 | Consolidated Catalina | Mk.Ib |
| May 1942 | Oct 1942 | Consolidated Catalina | Mk.IIIa |
| Sep 1942 | Apr 1943 | Short Sunderland | Mk.III |
| Jul 1944 | Feb 1945 | Fairey Albacore | Mk.I |
| Jan 1945 | May 1945 | Fairey Swordfish | Mk.III |
