= Douglas Colyer =

Royal Air Force commander (1893–1978)

Air Marshal Douglas Colyer CB CMG DFC (1 March 1893 - 23 February 1978) was a senior Royal Air Force commander during World War II.

Military offices
Preceded by James Robb	Air Officer Commanding No. 15 Group; 1942	Succeeded by Thomas Langford-Sainsbury
