= James Robb (RAF officer) =

Royal Air Force Air Chief Marshal (1895–1968)

Air Chief Marshal Sir James Milne Robb
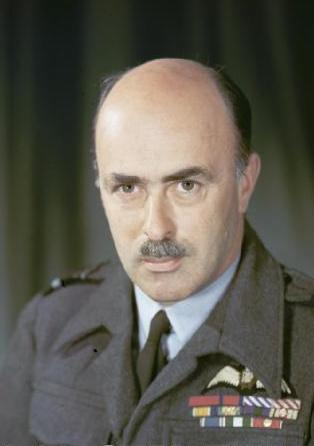
- Air Vice Marshal James Robb
- Born: 26 January 1895; Hexham, Northumberland
- Died: 18 December 1968 (aged 73); Bognor Regis, Sussex
- Military career
- Allegiance: United Kingdom
- Branch: British Army (1914–18); Royal Air Force (1918–51)
- Service years: 1914–51
- Rank: Air Chief Marshal
- Commands: Inspector-General of the RAF (1951); RAF Fighter Command (1945–47); No. 15 Group RAF (1941–42); No. 2 Group RAF (1940–41); Central Flying School (1936–40); No. 3 Squadron RAF (1926–27); No. 30 Squadron RAF (1924–26)
- Conflicts: First World War: Battle of Arras; Hundred Days Offensive; Iraqi revolt against the British; Second World War: Battle of France; Battle of Britain; Operation Torch; Tunisia Campaign; Allied invasion of Sicily; Allied invasion of Italy; Operation Overlord; Siegfried Line Campaign; Battle of the Bulge; Western Allied invasion of Germany
- Awards: Knight Grand Cross of the Order of the Bath; Knight Commander of the Order of the British Empire; Distinguished Service Order; Distinguished Flying Cross; Air Force Cross; Mentioned in Despatches (3); Distinguished Service Medal (United States); Officer of the Legion of Merit (United States); Commander of the Legion of Honour (France); Grand Cross of the Order of the White Lion (Czechoslovakia); War Cross 1939–1945 (Czechoslovakia)
- Relatives: William Robb (brother)

Air Chief Marshal Sir James Milne Robb, GCB, KBE, DSO, DFC, AFC (26 January 1895 – 18 December 1968) was a senior Royal Air Force commander. After early service in the First World War with the Northumberland Fusiliers, Robb joined the Royal Flying Corps and became a flying ace credited with seven aerial victories. He was granted a permanent commission in the Royal Air Force in 1919 and commanded No. 30 Squadron RAF in the Iraqi revolt against the British. In 1939, Robb travelled to Canada to help establish the Empire Air Training Scheme, a massive training program that provided the Royal Air Force with trained aircrew from Canada, Australia, New Zealand and Southern Rhodesia. He commanded No. 2 Group RAF of RAF Bomber Command and No. 15 Group RAF of RAF Coastal Command.

Robb became Deputy Chief of Combined Operations under Lord Louis Mountbatten in 1942. During Operation Torch he was air advisor to the Supreme Allied Commander, Lieutenant General Dwight Eisenhower and in February 1943, Eisenhower appointed him Deputy Commander of the Northwest African Air Forces. When Eisenhower became Supreme Allied Commander in Europe in January 1944, he brought Robb to his Supreme Headquarters Allied Expeditionary Force as Deputy Chief of Staff (Air). Robb became Commander-in-Chief of Fighter Command in 1945 and learned to fly the Gloster Meteor, the RAF's first operational jet aircraft. He became Vice-Chief of the Air Staff in 1947, and then Commander in Chief of the Western Union's air forces in 1948. In 1951 he became Inspector General of the RAF.

== Early life ==
James Milne Robb was born in Hexham, Northumberland on 26 January 1895, the third son of a draper, James Thomas Robb, and his wife Mary Elizabeth née Weir. He was educated at George Watson's School in Edinburgh and Durham University. He had two older brothers, one of whom, William, later became a major-general in the British Army.

== First World War ==
Following the outbreak of the First World War, Robb enlisted in the 4th Battalion, Northumberland Fusiliers. He was commissioned into the Northumberland Fusiliers as a second lieutenant on 10 November 1914, and promoted to captain a year later. In August 1916 he transferred to the Royal Flying Corps.

After learning to fly, Robb was posted to No. 32 Squadron RFC, a fighter squadron on the Western Front equipped with Airco DH.2s. Robb was wounded in March 1917 and spent some time with a training unit in England before returning to the Western Front in May 1918 as a flight commander with No. 92 Squadron RFC, flying SE5as. Robb achieved the squadron's first air victory on 22 July, shooting down a Fokker D.VII. In February 1919 he was awarded the Distinguished Flying Cross. His citation read:

This officer has destroyed seven enemy aircraft, and under his brilliant leadership his patrols have accounted for numerous others. On 13 October he attacked and silenced three hostile howitzers which were in action.

== Between the wars ==
In August 1919 he was granted a permanent commission in the Royal Air Force as a captain. He joined No. 24 Squadron RAF in February 1920. In September 1922 he was posted to No. 6 Squadron RAF in Iraq flying Bristol F.2 Fighters. He was promoted to squadron leader in 1924 and assumed command of No. 30 Squadron RAF. Robb was awarded the Distinguished Service Order for his service during operations in Kurdistan in 1925.

Returning to the United Kingdom in 1926, Robb became chief flying instructor at the Central Flying School at RAF Upavon in Wiltshire. He married Bessie Murray on 29 December 1927. Their marriage produced a son and a daughter. In 1932 he was promoted to the rank of wing commander and attended the Royal Naval Staff College in Greenwich, London. This was followed by a posting as senior air officer aboard the aircraft carrier Eagle in the Far East. In 1935 he became fleet aviation officer with the Mediterranean Fleet before returning to the Central Flying School as commandant. He was promoted to group captain in 1936.

== Second World War ==
In a ceremony at the airport in Frankfort, Germany, President Harry S. Truman (third from left) presents the Army Distinguished Service Medal to (opposite the President, L to R:) General H. D. G. Crerar, Canadian Army, Air Marshal Sir Arthur Coningham, Air Marshal Sir James Robb, and Major General Sir F. W. Guingand. President Truman is in Frankfort to inspect U. S. troops during a break in the Potsdam Conference.

In 1939, Robb travelled to Canada to help establish the Empire Air Training Scheme, a massive training program that provided the Royal Air Force with trained aircrew from Canada, Australia, New Zealand and Southern Rhodesia throughout the Second World War. In January 1940 he was promoted to air commodore. He took command of No. 2 Group RAF in April. In July 1940 he was awarded the Air Force Cross, and in September he was promoted again, this time to air vice marshal. On 1 January 1941, he was appointed a Companion of the Order of the Bath. However, he fell out with the head of RAF Bomber Command, Air Marshal Sir Richard Peirse, over the merits of sending Bristol Blenheims on unescorted daylight missions, which Robb regarded as suicidal. Robb was therefore transferred to RAF Coastal Command, where he command No. 15 Group RAF.

Robb became Deputy Chief of Combined Operations under Lord Louis Mountbatten in 1942. During Operation Torch he was air advisor to the Supreme Allied Commander, Lieutenant General Dwight Eisenhower. In February 1943, Eisenhower appointed him Deputy Commander of the Northwest African Air Forces under Major General Carl Spaatz. After Air Chief Marshal Tedder became Deputy Supreme Allied Commander in Europe in January 1944, he brought Robb to his Supreme Headquarters Allied Expeditionary Force as Deputy Chief of Staff (Air). Robb was promoted to air marshal in October 1944 and created a Knight Commander of the Order of the British Empire in January 1945. In May 1945 he was appointed the head of RAF Fighter Command and learned to fly the Gloster Meteor, the RAF's first operational jet aircraft. He claimed to have flown over 150 different aircraft types in his career. In August 1945 he received the U.S. Distinguished Service Medal from the President of the United States, Harry S. Truman.

== Post war ==
In 1947 Robb became Vice-Chief of the Air Staff. He then became Commander in Chief, Air Forces, Western Union Defence Organisation in 1948. Finally, in 1951 he became Inspector General of the RAF. He was created a Knight Commander of the Order of the Bath in June 1949, and in January 1951 was elevated to a Knight Grand Cross of the Order of the Bath. After retiring from the RAF on account of ill health he became King of Arms of the Order of the Bath on 21 March 1952, remaining in this appointment until 26 January 1965.

Robb was co-author of a volume of the official history of the Second World War, Victory in the West (1962), of which Major Lionel Ellis was the main author, with Captain G. R. G. Allen RN and Lieutenant Colonel A. E. Warhurst.

He died at a nursing home in Bognor Regis, Sussex on 18 December 1968.

== Notes ==
Military offices
Preceded by Rey Griffith Parry	Air Officer Commanding No. 15 Group; 1941–1942	Succeeded by Douglas Colyer
Preceded by Sir Roderic Hill	Commander-in-Chief Fighter Command; 1945–1947	Succeeded by Sir William Elliot
Preceded by Sir William Dickson	Vice-Chief of the Air Staff; 1947–1948	Succeeded by Sir Arthur Sanders
Preceded by Sir Hugh Saunders	Inspector-General of the RAF; 1951	Succeeded by Sir Thomas Williams
Heraldic offices
Preceded by Sir Max Horton	King of Arms of the Order of the Bath; 1952–1965	Succeeded by Sir Richard Goodbody
