= Leonard Slatter =

Royal Air Force Air Marshal (1894–1961)

Sir Leonard Slatter
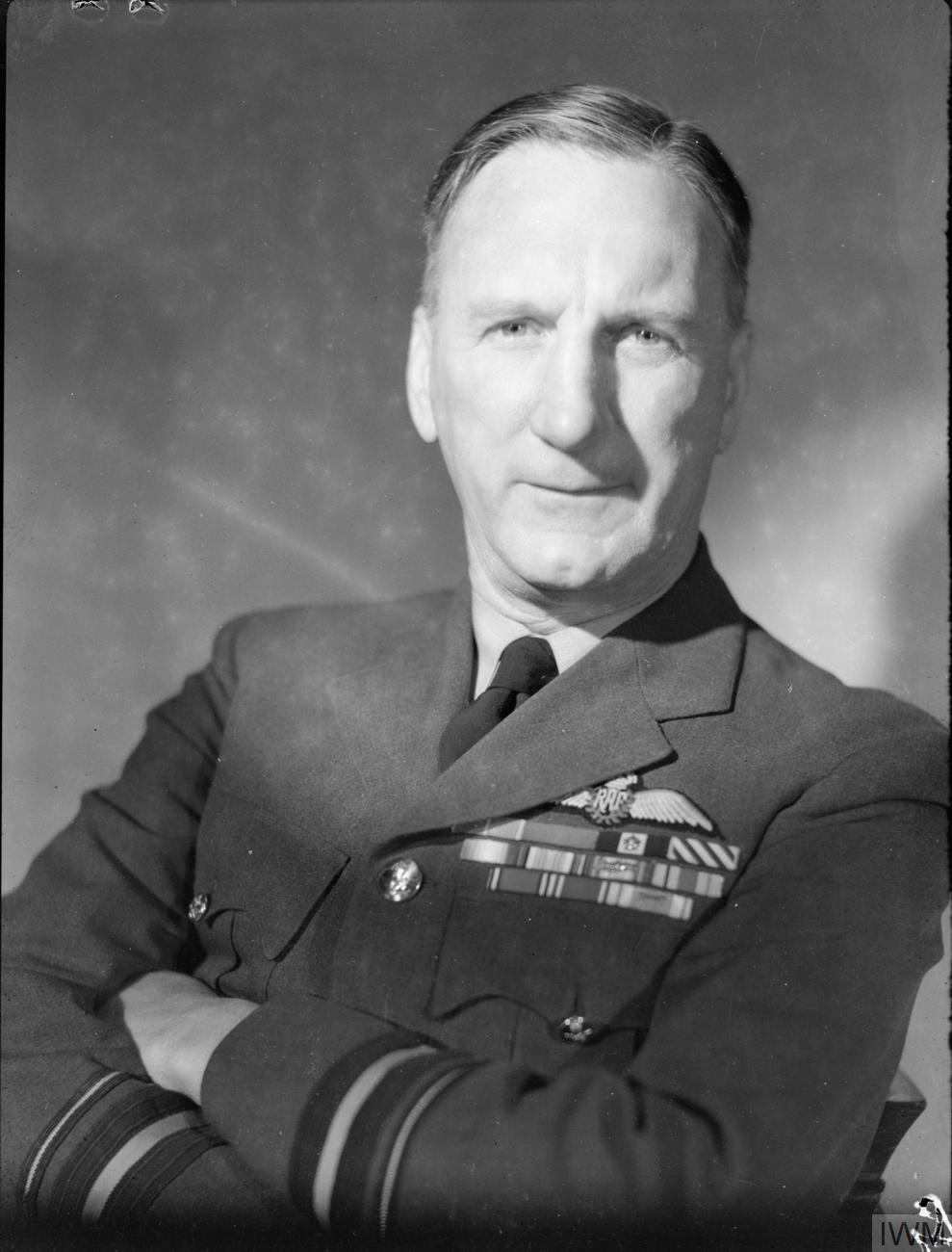
- Air Vice Marshal Sir Leonard Slatter c.1943
- Born: 8 December 1894; Durban, South Africa
- Died: 14 April 1961 (aged 66); Uxbridge, England
- Military career
- Allegiance: United Kingdom
- Branch: Royal Navy (1914–18); Royal Air Force (1918–49)
- Service years: 1914–49
- Rank: Air Marshal
- Commands: Coastal Command (1945–48); No. 15 Group (1943–45); No. 9 (Fighter) Group (1942); No. 201 (Naval Co-operation) Group (1941–42); No. 203 Group (1940–41); RAF Bassingbourn (1939); RAF Feltwell (1937–39); RAF Tangmere (1935–37); No. 43 Squadron (1930–31); RAF Hornchurch (1929–30); No. 111 Squadron (1929–30); No. 19 Squadron (1929); High Speed Flight (1926–28); RAF Base Malta (1924–26); No. 230 Squadron (1922–23); No. 203 Squadron (1921)
- Conflicts: First World War; Second World War
- Awards: Knight Commander of the Order of the British Empire; Companion of the Order of the Bath; Distinguished Service Cross & Bar; Distinguished Flying Cross; Mentioned in Despatches; Order of Saint Stanislaus, 2nd Class (Russia); Grand Commander of the Royal Order of George I (Greece)

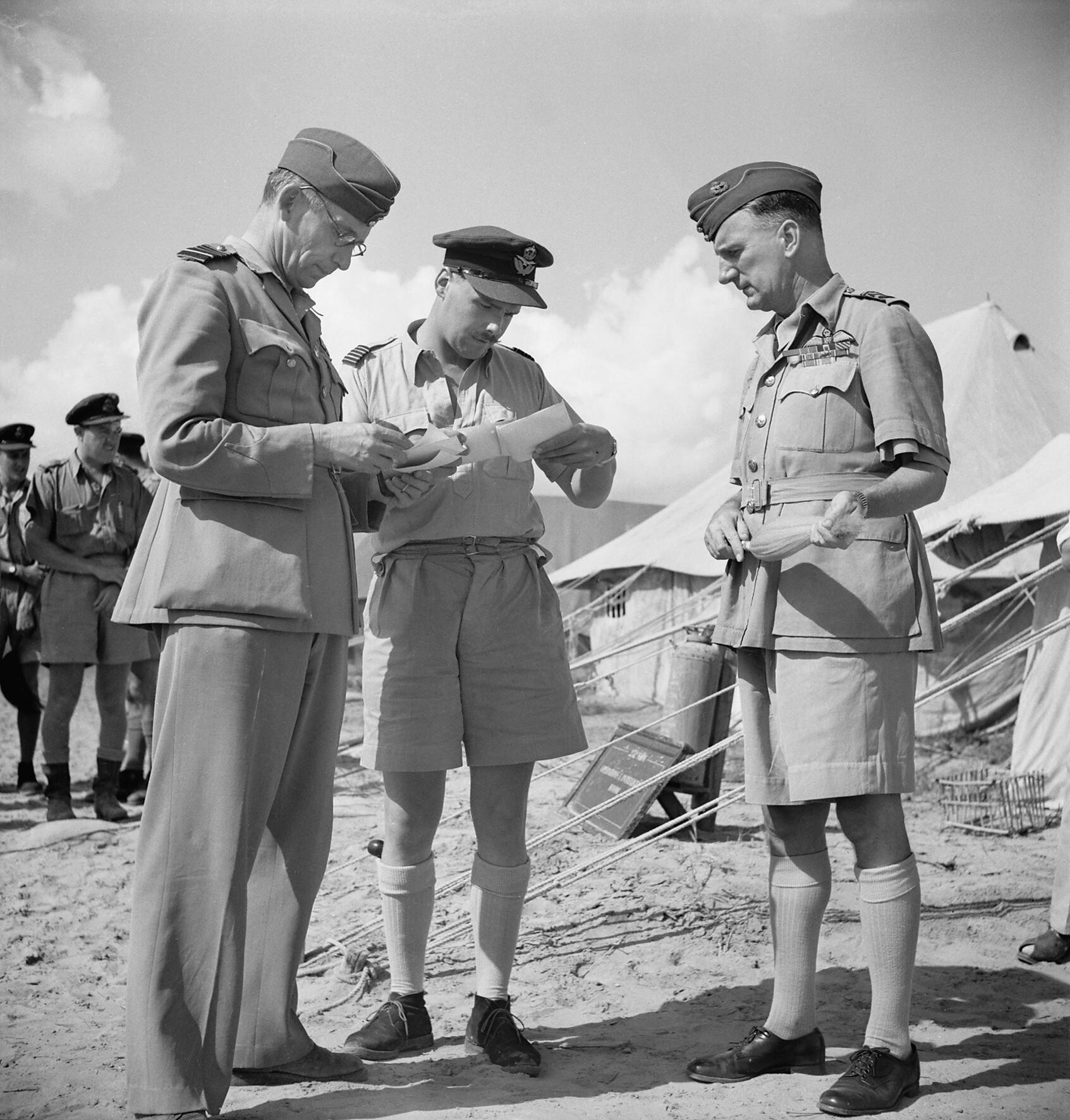
Air Vice Marshal Slatter, right, with Air Chief Marshal Sir Arthur Tedder, left, at Idku, Egypt, prior to the Alamein offensive

Air Marshal Sir Leonard Horatio Slatter, KBE, CB, DSC & Bar, DFC, DL (8 December 1894 – 14 April 1961) was a naval aviator during the First World War and a senior Royal Air Force commander during the Second World War. Slatter ended his career as the Air Officer Commanding-in-Chief of Coastal Command.

== Early life and First World War ==
Slatter was born in Durban, South Africa on 8 December 1894. He received his education at Dale College and Selborne College in South Africa and then at Battersea Polytechnic, training to be a civil engineer.

With the outbreak of the First World War he joined the Royal Navy. He initially served as a dispatch rider in the Naval Armoured Car Division before transferring to the Royal Naval Air Service in 1915. After successfully completing his observer training, Slatter was posted in February 1916 to the Seaplane Squadron at Dunkirk.

In July 1916 Slatter started his training to be a naval pilot and later in that year he commenced flying duties at Royal Naval Air Station Dover. February 1917 saw Slatter posted to the Seaplane Defence Flight (later to become No. 13 (Naval) Squadron and then No. 213 Squadron RAF) as a pilot operating out of Dunkirk. During this time Slatter shot down six enemy aircraft, was awarded the Distinguished Service Cross twice. and was advanced from pilot to flight commander.

In July 1918, Slatter was removed from front-line duties and sent to No. 4 Aeroplane Supply Depot, as an instructor. While still acting as an instructor, Slatter crossed the front lines and shot down his seventh and final enemy aircraft on 30 August 1918.

== Between the wars ==
After the war, Slatter opted to remain in the newly formed Royal Air Force. He saw further active service as a flight commander on No. 47 Squadron RAF flying DH9s and DH9As in southern Russia in the first half of 1919. Slatter received a permanent RAF commission in 1919 and was made a flight lieutenant.

After his return to Great Britain, Slatter took up duties as a flight commander on No. 205 Squadron at RAF Leuchars. In 1921, Slatter was posted to No. 203 Squadron, still based at Leuchars, flying Nightjars. He later became the squadron's commander whilst the squadron was deployed in Turkey. 1922 saw Slatter transferred again, this time to No. 230 Squadron where he served as both a flight commander and as the officer commanding. In early 1924 Slatter was substantively promoted to squadron leader and posted to Malta where he served as the commander of the RAF base for over two years. On his return in 1926, Slatter spent a few months as a supernumerary at the RAF Depot.

In late 1926, Slatter was appointed Officer Commanding the RAF High Speed Flight at the Marine Aircraft Experimental Establishment. Slatter was responsible for preparing his team to compete in the 1927 Schneider Trophy competition in Venice. He went on to be Officer Commanding No. 19 Squadron at RAF Duxford and then Officer Commanding No. 111 Squadron at RAF Hornchurch, where he was also Station Commander, before being appointed Officer Commanding No. 43 Squadron at RAF Tangmere in 1930. He was Officer responsible for flying on the aircraft carrier HMS Courageous from 1932 before returning as Station Commander at RAF Tangmere and then becoming Station Commander at RAF Feltwell and then RAF Bassingbourn.

== Second World War ==
At the start of the Second World War he was Senior Air Staff Officer at No. 1 Group although he moved on to be Air Officer Administration at Headquarters British Forces in Iraq in 1940. He went on to be Air Officer Commanding successively at No. 203 Group then No. 201 Group and then No. 9 Group. He was appointed Air Officer Commanding No. 15 Group in February 1943, where his role was to ensure that vital materials were brought safely from the US to the UK, before becoming Air Officer Commanding-in-Chief at RAF Coastal Command in June 1945. He retired in 1949.

== Place of burial ==
Slatter is buried in the churchyard at Halton in Buckinghamshire.

== Notes ==
Military offices
Preceded by Thomas Langford-Sainsbury	Air Officer Commanding No. 15 Group; 1943–1945	Succeeded by Norman Pritchett
Preceded by Sir Sholto Douglas	Air Officer Commanding-in-Chief Coastal Command; 1945–1948	Succeeded by Sir John Baker
