= RAF Swingfield =

Former RAF station in Kent, England

RAF Swingfield
- Near Wootton, Kent in England

Site information
- Type: RAF Advanced landing ground
- Code: IF
- Owner: Air Ministry
- Operator: Royal Air Force
- Controlled by: RAF Fighter Command * No. 11 Group RAF

Location
- Shown within Kent RAF Swingfield (the United Kingdom)
- Coordinates: 51°09′44″N 001°12′06″E

Site history
- Built: 1944
- Built by: Royal Engineers Airfield Construction Group
- In use: August 1944 – April 1945
- Battles/wars: European theatre of World War II

Airfield information
- Elevation: 140 metres (459 ft) AMSL
Runways
Direction	Length and surface
00/00	Sommerfeld Tracking
00/00	Sommerfeld Tracking

Royal Air Force Swingfield or more simply RAF Swingfield is a former Royal Air Force Advanced landing ground located 5.5 miles (8.9 km) north west of Dover, Kent and 4.5 miles (7.2 km) south of Aylesham, Kent. The airfield was operational between February 1917 and 28 April 1945.

== History ==
The airfield was used by both the Royal Flying Corps and the Royal Air Force opening during February 1917 and closing on 28 April 1945.

=== Based units ===
- No. 157 (General Reconnaissance) Wing RAF (August - September 1944)
- No. 119 Squadron RAF flying Fairey Albacores between 9 August 1944 and 2 October 1944
- 819 Naval Air Squadron
