= Thomas Langford-Sainsbury =

Royal Air Force Air Vice-Marshal (1897–1972)

- Born: 23 November 1897
- Died: 21 June 1972 (aged 74)
- Military career
- Allegiance: United Kingdom
- Branch: British Army (1916–18); Royal Air Force (1918–49)
- Service years: 1916–49
- Rank: Air Vice Marshal
- Commands: AHQ Egypt (1944–45); AHQ Eastern Mediterranean (1944); No. 201 (Naval Co-operation) Group (1943–44); No. 15 (General Reconnaissance) Group (1942–43); No. 48 Squadron (1936–38); No. 36 Squadron (1932–35)
- Conflicts: First World War; Second World War
- Awards: Companion of the Order of the Bath; Officer of the Order of the British Empire; Distinguished Flying Cross; Air Force Cross & Two Bars; Mentioned in Despatches

Air Vice Marshal Thomas Audley Langford-Sainsbury, CB, OBE, DFC, AFC & Two Bars (23 November 1897 – 21 June 1972) was a senior Royal Air Force officer who commanded British Air Forces in Egypt during the Second World War.

== RAF career ==
Educated at Radley College, Langford-Sainsbury was commissioned in to the Royal Flying Corps in 1916 during the First World War. He went on to command No. 38 Squadron from 1932 and No. 48 Squadron from 1936. Promoted to wing commander in 1937, he served in the Second World War on the Air Staff at Headquarters No. 16 (Reconnaissance) Group and then as Deputy Senior Air Staff Officer at RAF Coastal Command from 1941. He continued his war service as Air Officer Commanding No. 15 (General Reconnaissance) Group from 1942, Air Officer Commanding No. 201 (Naval Co-operation) Group from 1943 and Air Officer Commanding AHQ Eastern Mediterranean from 1944. He was made Air Officer Commanding AHQ Egypt in November 1944 and Senior Air Staff Officer at Headquarters RAF Bomber Command in May 1945.

After the war he served as Air Officer Administration at Headquarters British Air Forces of Occupation before retiring in 1949.

Military offices
Preceded by Douglas Colyer	Air Officer Commanding No. 15 (General Reconnaissance) Group; 1942–1943	Succeeded by Leonard Slatter
Preceded by James Scarlett-Streatfield (Acting)	Air Officer Commanding No. 201 (Naval Co-operation) Group; 1943–1944	Absorbed into Air Defence Eastern Mediterranean
