= Saunders-Roe A.36 Lerwick =

British flying boat

A.36 Lerwick
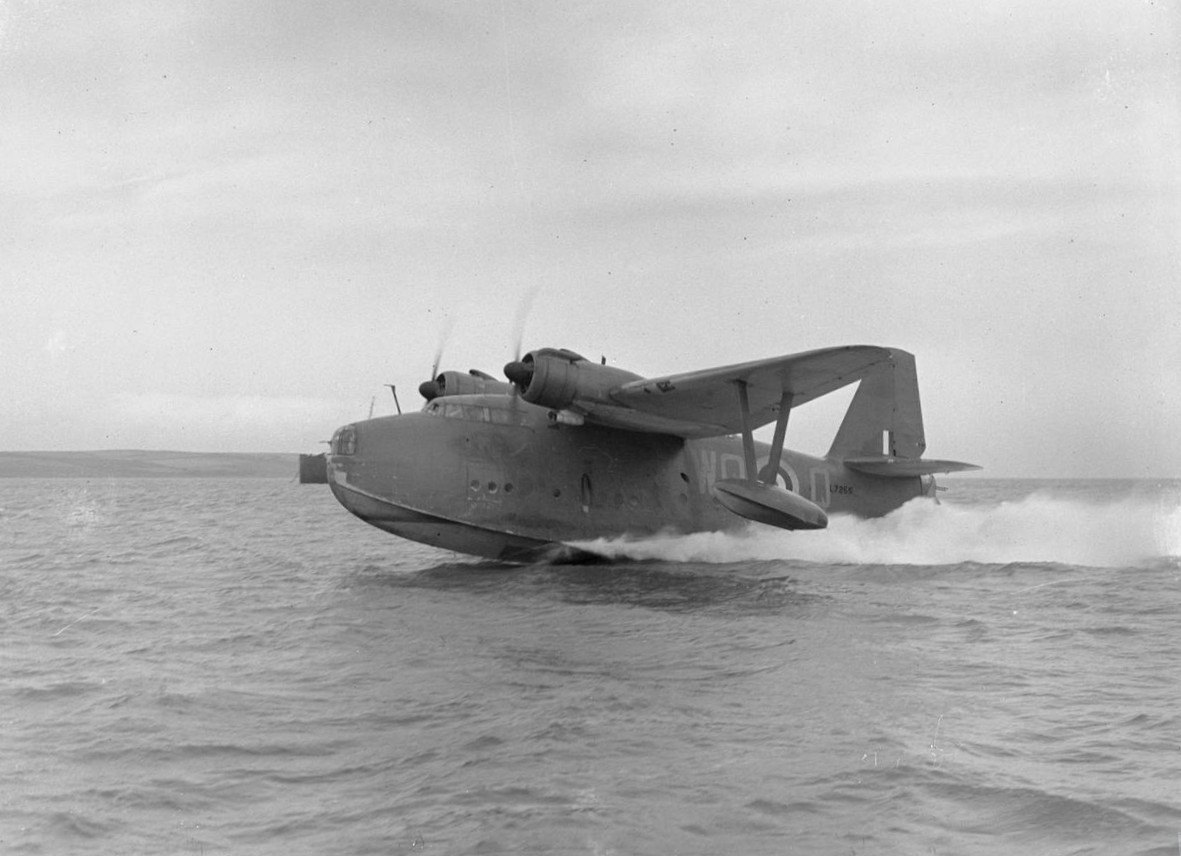
- Lerwick L7265, ‘WQ-Q’ of 209 Squadron. Taking off from Loch Ryan, March 1941

General information
- Type: Maritime patrol/Anti-submarine aircraft
- Manufacturer: Saunders-Roe
- Primary users: Royal Air Force Royal Canadian Air Force
- Number built: 21

History
- Introduction date: 1940
- First flight: November 1938
- Retired: 1942

The Saunders-Roe A.36 Lerwick was a British flying boat built by Saunders-Roe Limited (Saro). It was intended to be used with the Short Sunderland in Royal Air Force Coastal Command but it was a flawed design and only a small number were built. They had a poor service record and a high accident rate; of 21 aircraft, 10 were lost to accidents and one for an unknown reason.

== Design and development ==
Air Ministry Specification R.1/36 (to meet Operational Requirement 32) was issued in March 1936 to several companies that had experience in building flying boats. The specification was for a medium-range flying boat for anti-submarine, convoy escort and reconnaissance duties to replace the Royal Air Force's biplane flying boats such as the Saro London and Supermarine Stranraer. The specification called for a cruise speed of 230 miles per hour (370 km/h) and a weight of no more than 25,000 pounds (11,000 kg).

Designs were tendered by Saunders-Roe (S.36), Supermarine (Type 314), Blackburn Aircraft (b. 20) and Shorts. The Blackburn B.20 was a radical design which offered much better performance by reducing the drag associated with a flying boat hull, and so a prototype was ordered to test the concept. Of the other designs, the Supermarine was the first choice with Saro and Shorts tied in second place. The Supermarine was ordered "off the drawing board" (without requiring prototypes to be produced and flown first). Supermarine's commitment to the Spitfire meant that work was not expected to start for two years and so the Ministry looked to the other designs. Saunders-Roe had redesigned the S.36 in the meantime, replacing the low hull and gull wing with a deeper hull and a high wing, and the Supermarine order was transferred to the S.36. The contract was issued in June 1937 to buy 21, which was given the service name Lerwick (after the town of Lerwick). The aircraft was a compact twin-engined, high-winged monoplane of all-metal construction, with a conventional flying boat hull, a planing bottom and two stabilising floats carried under the wings on long struts. It was powered by two Bristol Hercules radial engines and initially had twin fins and rudders. For defence, the Lerwick was equipped with three powered gun turrets. The nose turret had a single 0.303 inch Vickers K gun; the other two had 0.303 Browning machine guns, two guns in the Nash & Thompson FN.8 turret in the dorsal position and four in the Nash & Thompson FN4.A turret in the tail. Offensive armament was a total of 2,000 pounds (910 kg) of bombs or depth charges; four 500-pound (230 kg) or eight 250-pound (110 kg) bombs, or four depth charges, carried in two streamlined nacelles behind the engines, similar to the Martin PBM Mariner.

The first three aircraft were used as prototypes, with the first being launched on 31 October 1938, after numerous delays during design and construction. The Lerwick was immediately found to be unstable in the air, on the water and not suited to "hands off" flying, a major problem in an aircraft designed for long-range patrols. Numerous adjustments, including the addition of a greatly enlarged single fin and an increase in the wing angle of incidence, failed to remedy its undesirable characteristics, which included a vicious stall and unsatisfactory rates of roll and yaw. In service, several aircraft were lost because of wing floats breaking off, suggesting this was a structural weakness. Persistent problems with the hydraulics resulted in bomb doors sometimes dropping open during flight.

On one engine the Lerwick could not maintain altitude or maintain a constant heading, as the controls could not counter the torque of one engine on maximum power. An engine failure would inevitably see the aircraft flying in slowly descending circles. On one occasion, the loss of an engine forced a Lerwick to make an emergency landing in the Caledonian Canal. The aircraft was then towed to Oban at the end of a string of coal barges.

== Operational history ==
In mid-1939, four Lerwicks were allocated to 240 Squadron. By October, the squadron had stopped flying them and reverted to its older and slower Saro London flying boats. The Lerwick programme was cancelled on 24 October but restarted on 1 November. In December 1939, Air Vice-Marshal Sholto Douglas recommended that the Lerwicks be scrapped and Saunders-Roe put to building Short Sunderlands but the production change would have taken months and with the start of the Second World War, aircraft were urgently required.

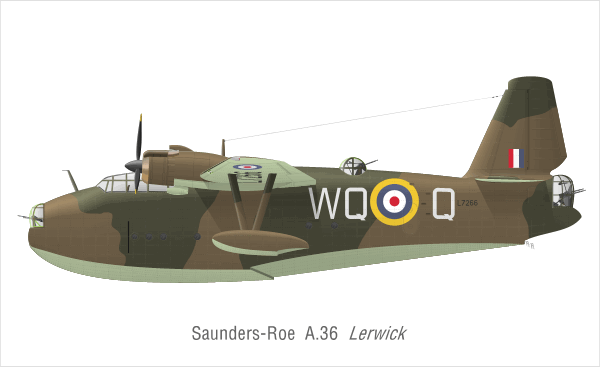
Lerwick in the markings of 209 squadron

Production continued and the type entered service with 209 Squadron based at Oban in 1940, replacing Supermarine Stranraers. The squadron soon began losing aircraft to accidents. During the service with 209 Squadron, all the Lerwicks were grounded twice for urgent safety modifications; on only two occasions were U-boats attacked by a Lerwick and neither submarine was damaged.

In April 1941, 209 Squadron began receiving the US Consolidated Catalina. The last of a total of 21 Lerwicks was delivered in May but the type was withdrawn from front-line service in the same month. Most of the remaining Lerwicks were transferred to Number 4 (Coastal) Operational Training Unit at Invergordon; three were sent to 240 Squadron for service trials at the Marine Aircraft Experimental Establishment at Helensburgh.

In mid-1942, the Lerwicks were briefly returned to service, for the purpose of operational training with 422 Squadron and 423 Squadron of the Royal Canadian Air Force, based at Lough Erne. By the end of 1942, the type had been declared obsolete; by early 1943, the survivors had been scrapped.

== Operators ==
Canada

- Royal Canadian Air Force
  - No. 422 Squadron RCAF
  - No. 423 Squadron RCAF

United Kingdom

- Marine Aircraft Experimental Establishment
- Royal Air Force
  - No. 209 Squadron RAF: 1939–1941
  - No. 240 Squadron RAF : Three Lerwicks used for service trials.
  - No. 4 (Coastal) Operational Training Unit: 1941

== Specifications (Saro Lerwick) ==
Data from Saunders Roe and Saro Aircraft since 1917

General characteristics

- Crew: 6-9
- Length: 63 ft 7.5 in (19.393 m)
- Wingspan: 80 ft 10 in (24.64 m)
- Height: 20 ft 0 in (6.10 m)
- Wing area: 845 sq ft (78.5 m^{2})
- Gross weight: 28,400 lb (12,882 kg)
- Max takeoff weight: 33,200 lb (15,059 kg)
- Fuel capacity: 780 imp gal (937 US gal; 3,546 L) normal; 1,440 imp gal (1,729 US gal; 6,546 L) overload
- Powerplant: 2 × Bristol Hercules II 14-cylinder air-cooled radial piston engines, 1,356 hp (1,011 kW) each at 2,750 rpm at 4,000 ft (1,219 m)

1,272 hp (949 kW) at 2,800 rpm for takeoff

- Propellers: 3-bladed de Havilland Hydromatic, 13 ft 6 in (4.11 m) diameter constant-speed propellers

Performance

- Maximum speed: 214 mph (344 km/h, 186 kn)
- Cruise speed: 166 mph (267 km/h, 144 kn)
- Range: 1,540 mi (2,480 km, 1,340 nmi) at 200 mph (174 kn; 322 km/h)
- Service ceiling: 14,000 ft (4,300 m)
- Rate of climb: 880 ft/min (4.5 m/s)

Armament

- Guns: One .303 in (7.7 mm) Vickers K gun in bow turret, two × .303 in (7.7 mm) Browning machine guns in a dorsal turret and four in a tail turret
- Bombs: 2,000 lb (907 kg) of bombs or depth charges

== Operational losses ==
Eleven of the 21 Lerwicks built were lost or written off during the three years the type saw operational service.

Date	Aircraft	Cause of loss
1 Sep 1939	L7249	Operating with the Marine Aircraft Experimental Establishment at Felixstowe, sank after launching as a camera hatch was left open; written off
20 Feb 1940	L7253 (WQ-G)	Made an emergency touch–down in the Firth of Lorn, 5 miles west of Oban. A wing float broke off as it touched down, the aircraft rolled upside down and four crew died.
29 Jun 1940	L7261	Wing float broke off while taxiing after landing, rolled over and sank in Ardentrive Bay, Kerrera; no casualties. The aircraft was recovered but was a total loss
21 Nov 1940	L7251	Sank at its moorings in Loch Ryan
6 Dec 1940	L7255 (WQ-A)	Sank, when it lost a wing float in a gale while moored on Loch Ryan
7 Jan 1941	L7262	Sank after an accident during take-off on Loch Ryan; two crew died.
22 Feb 1941	L7263 (WQ-L)	Went missing while on patrol in good weather with a crew of 14
24 Mar 1941	L7252	Sank after an emergency touch–down in the Bristol Channel – an engine partially broke loose from its mountings and one of the propeller blades slashed the fuselage. The aircraft slowly sank: the crew were rescued by HMS Jackal (F22) after spending 24 hours in an inflatable dingy.
14 Oct 1941	L7268	Operating with No. 4 (C)OTU, crashed into the sea near Tarbat Ness, following failure of the port engine. Six of the crew were killed.
16 Oct 1941	L7254	Sank after striking a rock during taxi-ing
21 Oct 1941	L7248	First Lerwick built. While on an MAEE calibration flight the starboard engine failed. Unable to maintain height on one engine, L7248 hit telegraph wires before crashing into a hillside above Faslane, killing six RAF personnel and a civilian technician. An investigation was unable to find the cause for the engine failure.
11 Nov 1941	L7257 (WQ-F)	Sank at its moorings during a gale; salvaged in December 1941. Struck off charge in 1942 as being beyond repair
21 Dec 1941	L7265 (WQ-Q)	Flying with No. 4 (C)OTU, it was written off after crashing during landing
6 Sep 1942	L7267	Lost during an aborted landing, the pilot increased power to go-around but one engine failed to respond. A wingtip struck the water and the aircraft was spun around, opening a gash in the hull. The crew climbed out through the astrodome and swam toward shore as the aircraft sank, but were picked up by a boat

== See also ==
Aircraft of comparable role, configuration, and era

- Consolidated PBY Catalina
- Martin PBM Mariner
- Dornier Do 24

Related lists

- List of aircraft of World War II
- List of aircraft of the Royal Air Force
- List of flying boats and floatplanes
