= No. 228 Squadron RAF =

Defunct flying squadron of the Royal Air Force

- Active: 20 August 1918 - 30 June 1919; 15 December 1936 – 4 June 1945; 1 June 1946 - 30 September 1946; 1 July 1954 - 6 March 1959; 1 September 1959 – 28 August 1964
- Country: United Kingdom
- Branch: Royal Air Force
- Role: anti-submarine, reconnaissance and air-sea rescue
- Mottos: Latin: Auxilium a caelo (Translation: "Help from the sky")

Insignia
- Squadron Badge heraldry: A winged helmet
- Squadron Codes: TO (Apr 1939 - May 1939); BH (May 1939 - Sep 1939); DQ (Sep 1939 - Aug 1943); UE (Jul 1944 - Jun 1945); L (Jul 1954 - 1956); 228 (1956 - May 1959)

No. 228 Squadron RAF was a squadron of the Royal Air Force active at various times between 1918 and 1964. It spent the greatest part of its existence flying over water, doing so in the First, and Second World Wars and beyond, performing anti-submarine, reconnaissance and air-sea rescue tasks.

== History ==
=== Formation and the First World War ===
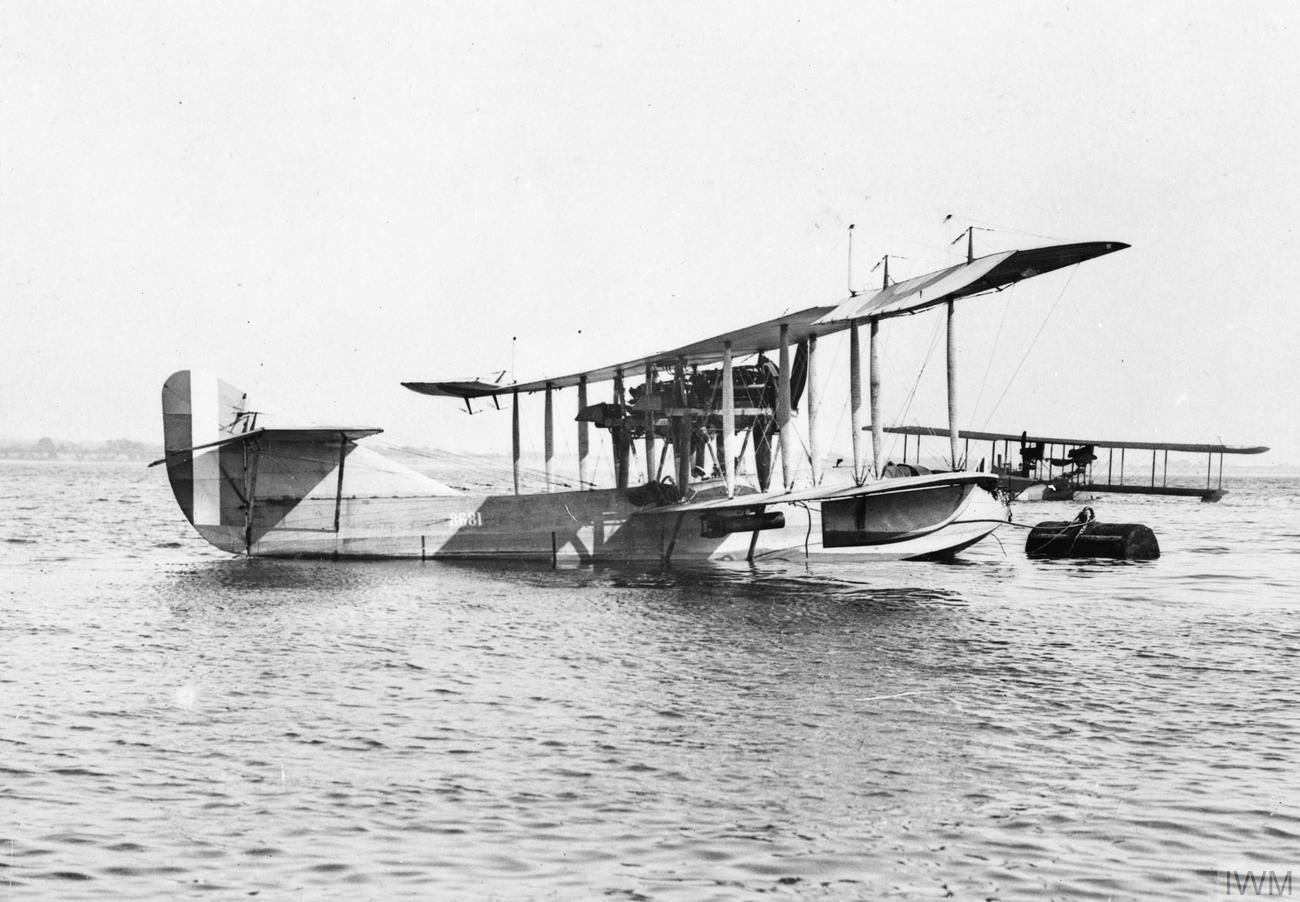
A Curtiss H.12 used by the RNAS

The squadron formed on 20 August 1918 at Great Yarmouth during the re-organisation of the former RNAS stations of Nos. 324, 325 and 326 Flights. The squadron was initially equipped with both Felixstowe F.2A and Curtiss H.16 aircraft and was involved in anti-submarine patrols. The last patrol was flown on 24 October 1918 and the squadron disbanded on 30 June 1919 at RNAS Killingholme.

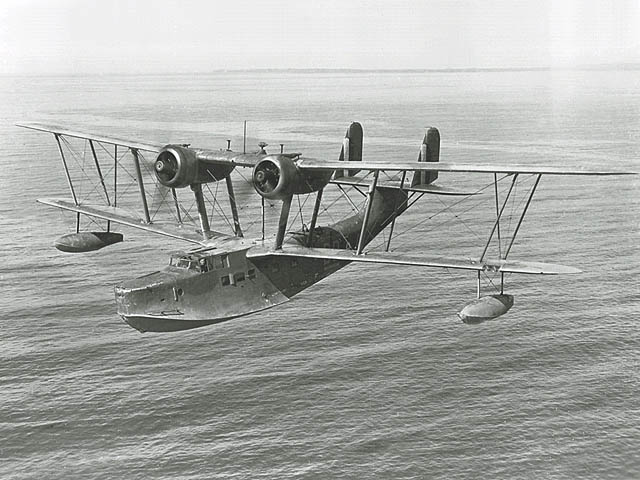
A Supermarine Stranraer as flown by 228 Squadron

=== Reformation ===
The squadron reformed on 15 December 1936 at RAF Pembroke Dock, and was initially equipped with a variety of aircraft including Short Singapores, a Supermarine Scapa, a Saro London and a Supermarine Stranraer. However, by September 1938 the squadron was just operating Stranraers. In November 1938 the squadron received its first Short Sunderland, and by April 1939 the squadron was completely re-equipped with Sunderlands.

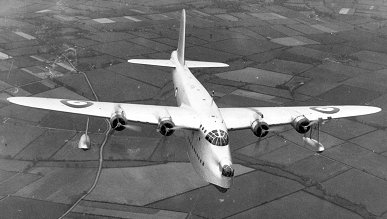
A Short Sunderland

=== Second World War ===
When the Second World War began the squadron was at RAF Alexandria in Egypt. The squadron immediately returned to Pembroke Dock and sent detachments to RAF Invergordon, in Ross and Cromarty, Scotland and RAF Sullom Voe in the Shetland Isles of Scotland. In June 1940 the squadron returned to Egypt following Italy's declaration of war on Britain. In June 1941 the squadron moved to Gambia, West Africa, returning in August 1941 to Pembroke Dock and then RAF Stranraer, in Dumfries and Galloway, Scotland, to be re-equipped. In March 1942 at RAF Oban in Argyll and Bute, Scotland, the squadron became operational again, moving to RAF Lough Erne, in County Fermanagh, Northern Ireland, in December 1942 and then back to Pembroke Dock in May 1943, where it remained until disbanding on 4 June 1945.

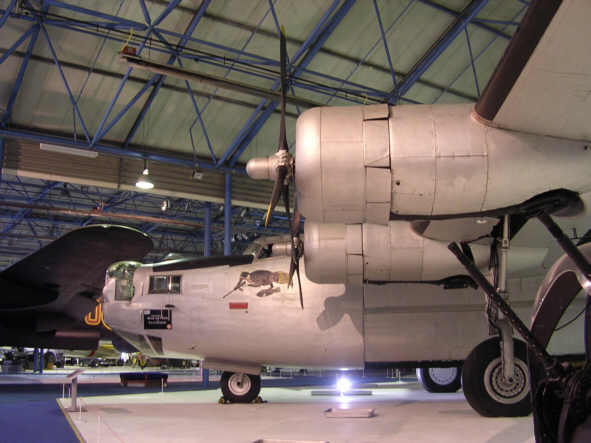
A Liberator at the Royal Air Force Museum London at the Hendon Aerodrome.

=== On Liberators ===
On 1 June 1946 the squadron reformed at RAF St Eval when No. 224 Squadron was renumbered. The squadron was equipped with Consolidated Liberators GR.6 and GR.8s and performed passenger and freight services with the Liberators to Ireland, Gibraltar, the Azores and Morocco, but also had reconnaissance, air-sea rescue and meteorological tasks. It disbanded on 30 September 1946 at RAF St Eval.

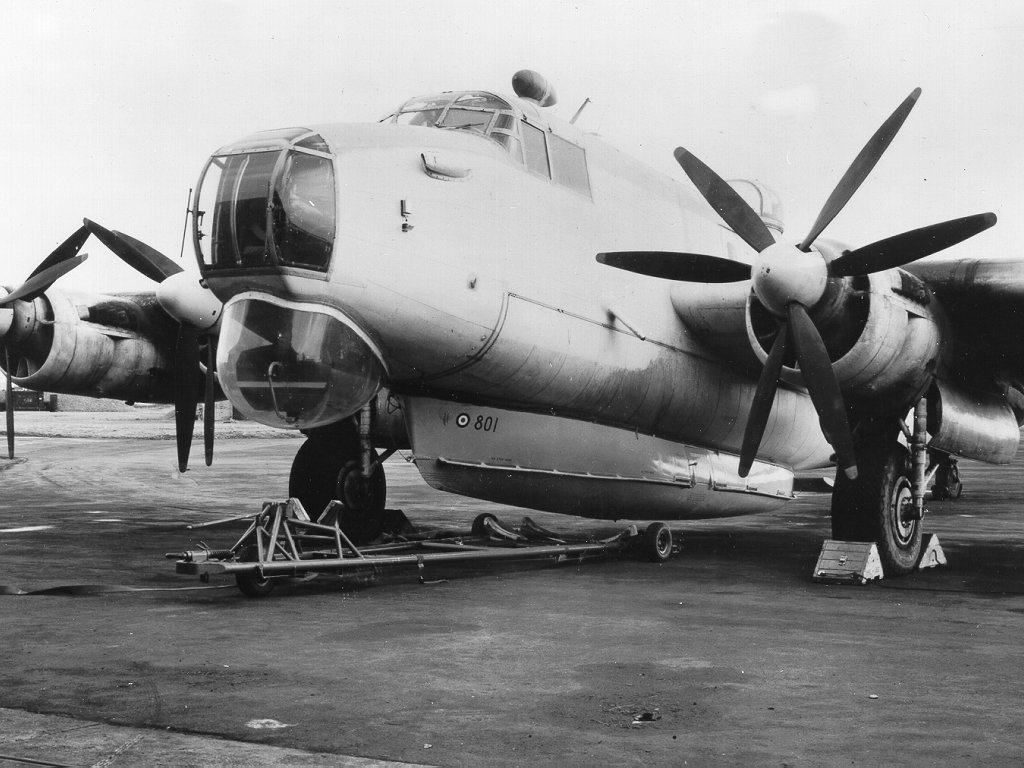
Avro Shackleton with Saunders-Roe airborne lifeboat

=== On Shackletons ===
The squadron reformed again on 1 July 1954 at St Eval, equipped with the Avro Shackleton as a maritime reconnaissance unit, moving in November 1956 to RAF St Mawgan and in January 1958 back to St Eval, where is disbanded on 1 April 1959.

=== On Helicopters ===
In September 1959 the squadron reformed again via the renumbering of No. 275 Squadron at RAF Leconfield. The squadron was now a helicopter search and rescue unit, flying Bristol Sycamores -passing them on to 118 sqn- and Westland Whirlwinds.

On 28 August 1964 the squadron was disbanded at Leconfield, when it was renumbered to No. 202 Squadron.

== Aircraft operated ==
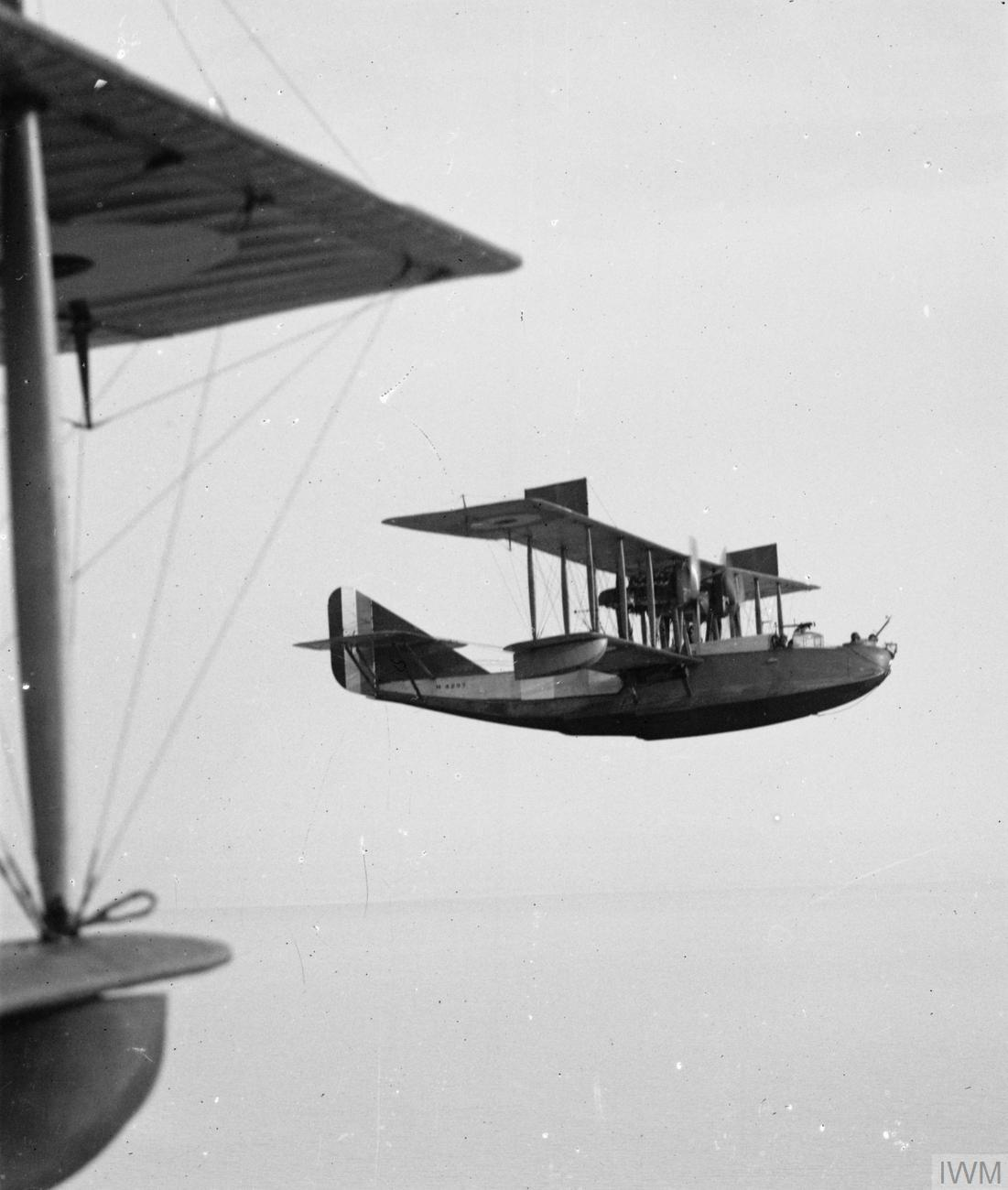
A Felixtowe F2A

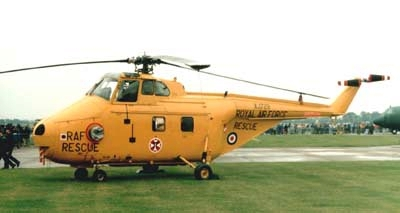
A Whirlwind used in the air-sea rescue role

Aircraft operated by no. 228 Squadron RAF, data from
From	To	Aircraft	Version
August 1918	April 1919	Felixstowe F.2	a
August 1918	March 1919	Curtiss Model H	16
February 1937	August 1938	Supermarine Scapa	
February 1937	September 1938	Saro London	Mk.I
April 1937	September 1937	Short Singapore	Mk.III
April 1937	April 1939 1937	Supermarine Stranraer	
November 1938	August 1941	Short Sunderland	Mk.I
November 1941	March 1943	Short Sunderland	Mk.I
November 1941	March 1943	Short Sunderland	Mk.II
March 1942	April 1945	Short Sunderland	Mk.III
February 1945	June 1945	Short Sunderland	Mk.V
June 1946	September 1946	Consolidated Liberator	Mk.VIII
July 1954	March 1959	Avro Shackleton	MR.2
September 1959	March 1960	Avro Anson	T.21
September 1959	June 1960	Bristol Sycamore	HR.14
September 1959	December 1962	Westland Whirlwind	HAR.2
September 1959	December 1962	Westland Whirlwind	HAR.4
September 1962	August 1964	Westland Whirlwind	HAR.10

== Squadron airfields ==
Airfields used by no. 228 Squadron RAF, data from
From	To	Base	Remark
20 August 1918	30 April 1919	RAF Great Yarmouth, Norfolk	
30 April 1919	5 June 1919	RAF Brough, East Riding of Yorkshire	
5 June 1919	30 June 1919	RAF Killingholme, Lincolnshire	
15 December 1936	29 September 1938	RAF Pembroke Dock, Pembrokeshire, Wales	
29 September 1938	9 October 1938	RAF Invergordon, Ross and Cromarty, Scotland	
9 October 1938	5 June 1939	RAF Pembroke Dock, Pembrokeshire, Wales	
5 June 1939	10 September 1939	RAF Alexandria, Egypt	
10 September 1939	10 June 1940	RAF Pembroke Dock, Pembrokeshire, Wales	
10 June 1940	19 July 1940	RAF Alexandria, Egypt	Detachment at RAF Kalafrana, Malta
19 July 1940	13 September 1940	RAF Aboukir, Egypt	Detachment at RAF Kalafrana, Malta
13 September 1940	25 March 1941	RAF Kalafrana, Malta	Detachment at RAF Alexandria, Egypt
25 March 1941	16 June 1941	RAF Alexandria, Egypt	
16 June 1941	28 August 1941	En route to West Africa	
28 August 1941	26 September 1941	RAF Bathurst, Gambia	
26 September 1941	9 October 1941	En route to UK	
9 October 1941	10 March 1942	RAF Stranraer, Wigtownshire, Scotland	re-established here
10 March 1942	11 December 1942	RAF Oban, Argyll and Bute, Scotland	
11 December 1942	4 May 1943	RAF Castle Archdale, County Fermanagh, Northern Ireland	(Lough Erne)
4 May 1943	4 June 1945	RAF Pembroke Dock, Pembrokeshire, Wales	
1 June 1946	30 September 1946	RAF St Eval, Cornwall	
1 July 1954	29 November 1956	RAF St Eval, Cornwall	
29 November 1956	14 January 1958	RAF St Mawgan, Cornwall	
14 January 1958	6 March 1959	RAF St Eval, Cornwall	
1 September 1959	28 August 1964	RAF Leconfield, Yorkshire	Dets. at RAF Acklington, Northumberland; RAF Leuchars, Fife, Scotland; RAF Horsham St Faith, Norfolk and RAF Coltishall, Norfolk
