= Short S.26 =

British flying boat (1930s-1950s)

S.26 'G-Class'
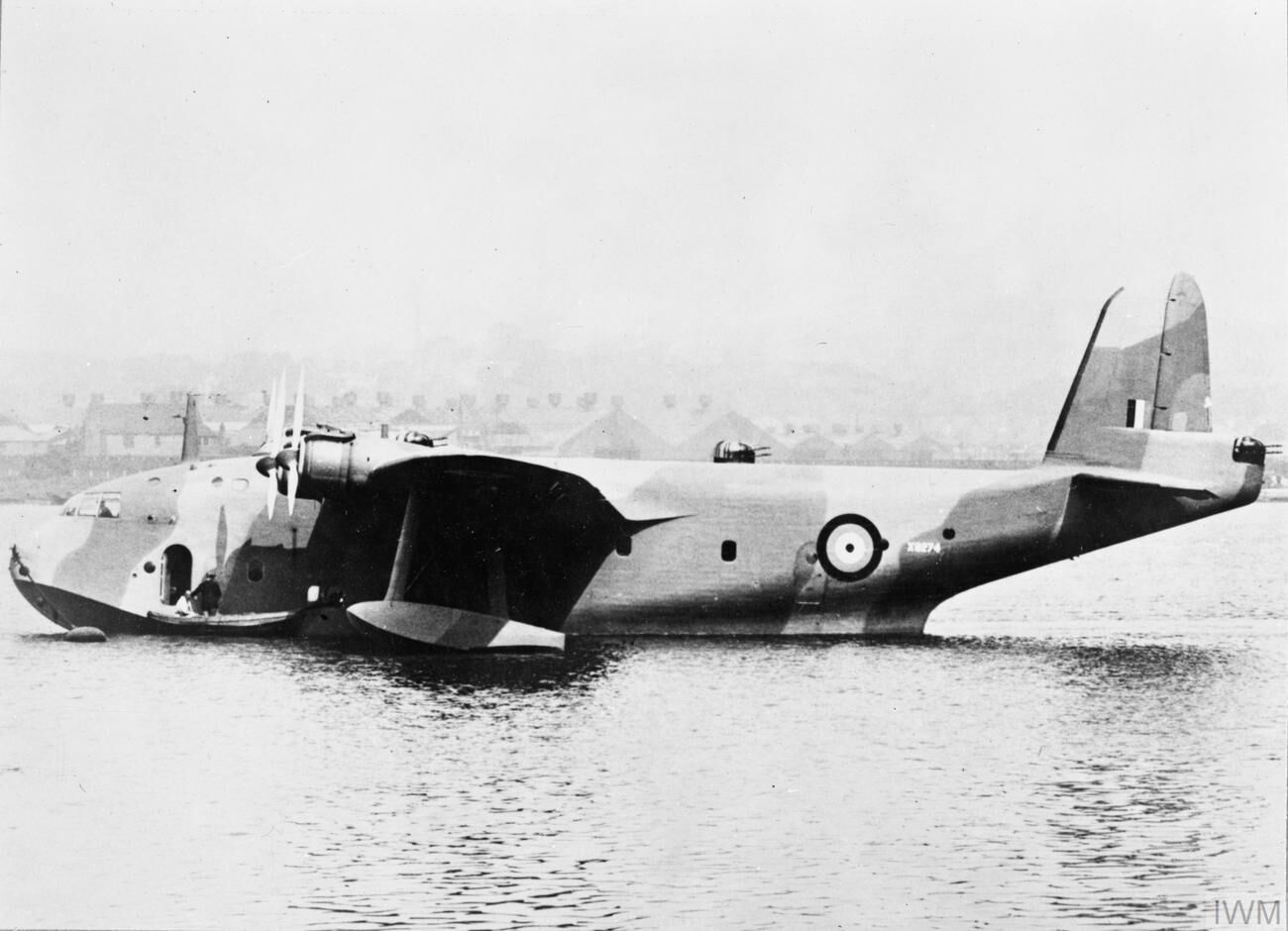
- Short S.26/M (X8274, formerly 'Golden Fleece'), after impressment in 1940

General information
- Type: Transport Flying Boat
- Manufacturer: Short Brothers
- Primary users: Royal Air Force Imperial Airways; British Overseas Airways Corporation
- Number built: 3

History
- First flight: 21 July 1939
- Developed from: Short Empire

The Short S.26 G-class was a large transport flying boat designed and produced by the British aircraft manufacturer Short Brothers. It was designed to achieve a non-stop transatlantic capability, increasing the viability of long distance services/duties.

The S.26 had been developed from the preceding Short Empire, a large flying boat developed during the early-to-mid 1930s. Compared to the Empire, it was even larger and designed to cover longer distances before needing to refuel. It had been developed at the request of the British airline Imperial Airways, as well as at the encouragement of the Air Ministry, who anticipated its potential use as a maritime patrol aircraft and other military purposes. First flown on 21 July 1939, a total of three S.26 flying boats were constructed on behalf of Imperial Airways, but these were only briefly operated by the airline in a training capacity due to the outbreak of the Second World War.

During 1940, all three S.26s were pressed into military service, leading to the type being used by both the Royal Air Force (RAF) and the Royal Australian Air Force (RAAF). They were reconfigured into a more suitable arrangement for military transport duties, after which individual flying boats transported mixed cargoes around the Mediterranean and the Middle East. In December 1941, two examples were released to the national airline British Overseas Airways Corporation (BOAC) and commenced civilian services shortly thereafter between the UK and Nigeria. Continuing to be flown after the end of the conflict, the S.26 fell out of use during the late 1940s and the last example of the type was scrapped during the following decade.

== Development ==
=== Background ===
During the early-to-mid 1930s, the aircraft manufacturer Short Brothers developed the Short Empire, a large civilian flying boat, on behalf of its primary customer, the British airliner Imperial Airways. According to aviation author C.H. Barnes, due to the Empire's considerable size, some figures within the Marine Aircraft Experimental Establishment (MAEE) has been sceptical of its development, some even doubting that such a flying boat would even be capable of lifting off. Despite this, it was also recognised that any aircraft of such dimensions would be of considerable value for a variety of military and civilian purposes. One concept that gained particular attention was the development of large flying boats with sufficiently strengthened hulls to withstand the forces involved in catapult-assisted takeoffs from dedicated naval auxiliary refuelling barges. It was speculated that a such-configured flying boat would be suitable for long-distance air mail flights and for long range maritime patrol missions.

During the late 1930s, two separate opportunities were presented that attracted Short's attention. Imperial Airways, being keen to maintain its competitive advantage, requested the company conduct a design study into an enlarged derivative of the Empire, suitable for carrying both mail or passengers along a transatlantic route without refuelling between Ireland and Newfoundland. Meanwhile, the Air Ministry had also invited Shorts to tender for the recently issued Specification 14/38, which sought a long-range high-altitude monoplane transport/airliner that would feature cabin pressurisation to enable high-altitude flight. The company decided to work concurrently on both designs, which featured considerable overlap with one another, including the use of an identical powerplant arrangement in the form of four Bristol Hercules radial engines. Confidence in the endeavour was greatly bolstered as the Empire flying boat proved itself to be quite capable, receiving the endorsement of officials such as Harry Garner, the MAEE's chief technical officer; suggestions by Garner for improving the Empire's performance were also explored during the design study.

=== Launch ===
The S.26 design study benefitted greatly from enhancements trialled by the aircraft designer Arthur Gouge, who had experimented with flush-fitting extendible hydrofoils as an alternative to the stepping of the hull on the Empire flying boat. Having been suitably convinced, even though a large order for the Empire was still in progress, Imperial Airways opted to order three S.26s, which the airline referred as of the 'G-class'. Around the same time, the Air Ministry had lost interest in the catapult concept and decided not to proceed with the thus-configured S.27; instead, it decided to subsidise Imperial Airway's purchase of the three S.26s under the stipulation that the airline make them available to the Royal Air Force (RAF) in the event of a major military conflict. The Air Ministry also ordered the Short Sunderland flying boat as well, with which the S.26 would share numerous design features.

On 17 June 1939, G-AFCI "Golden Hind", the first of the S.26s, was launched from Shorts' No.3 Shop, being the largest flying boat to ever emerge from the facility at that time. Following four days of final inspections and engine runs, on 21 July 1939, Golden Hind conducted its maiden flight, piloted by Shorts' chief test pilot, John Lankester Parker. Proving to be free of any issues, the handling schedules was completed on its second flight four days later, thus the flying boat was delivered to Imperial Airways on 24 September 1939 after only two further test flights.

== Design ==
The Short S.26 flying boat was designed as an enlarged Short C-Class Empire flying boat, also incorporating features from the Short Sunderland. Greater use of extrusions in the structure, rather than bent sheet sections, compared to the C-Class aircraft, helped to keep the weight down. It was designed with the capability of crossing the Atlantic without refuelling, and was intended to form the backbone of Imperial Airways' Empire services. The airline's plan was for the first aircraft to perform long range runs, while the second would operate medium length (2,000 miles) flights with a dozen passengers, and the third would conduct short range (1,000 miles) trips with 24 passengers. It could fly up to 6,000 miles unburdened, or carry up to 150 passengers for a "short hop". However, the hulls were deliberately delivered with an unfinished interior as they were intended to be initially used solely to carry air mail.

Propulsion consisted of four 1,400 hp (1,000 kW) Bristol Hercules sleeve valve radial engines. Up to 3,600 imp gal (16,000 L; 4,300 US gal) of fuel was carried in six drum-like tanks housed within the wing truss, similar to the Empire, except their greater depth made access to the wing's interior considerably easier for inspection and maintenance. As initially delivered, the S.26 featured a relatively vast hold that was partitioned by water-tight doors that were to be locked during takeoff and landing. In comparison to the earlier Empire, the S.26 featured an expanded cockpit with a dedicated position for a flight engineer. In typical operations, it had been envisioned to carry around two tonnes of mail bags along with a crew of five.

The militarised version, commonly referred to as the S.26/M, was a conversion of the existing civilian flying boats. It featured new defensive armaments, consisting of 12 0.303 inch machine guns in two dorsal and one tail, Boulton Paul BPA Mk II four-gun turrets. It also had carried eight 500 lb (230 kg) bombs that were held under the wings. The internal volume provided stowage for up to 20 reconnaissance flares, 28 flame floats and eight smoke floats. An Air to Surface Vessel (ASV) radar set was installed along with armour plating for key areas, which included the internal fuel tanks and the crew stations.

== Operational history ==
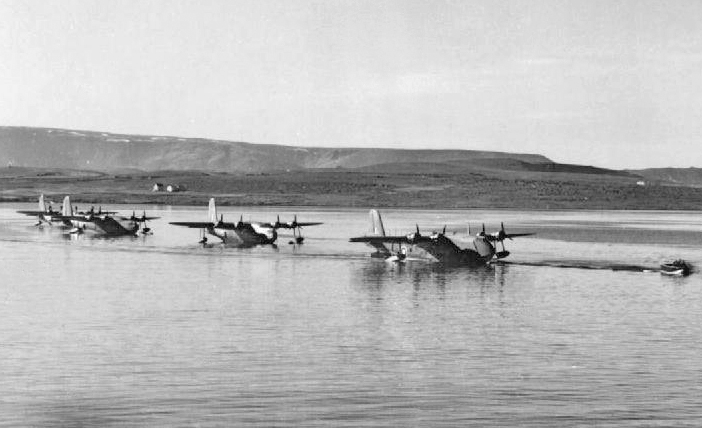
A Short S.26 ahead of three Short Sunderlands, circa 1941

While the first S.26 flying boat had been handed over to Imperial Airways to commence crew training during late September 1939, only days following its delivery, the airline was informed that all three were to be impressed, along with their crews, into military service with the RAF before any could conduct an operational service. On 24 February 1940, the second (G-AFCJ "Golden Fleece") flew, and the third (G-AFCK "Golden Horn") flew on 8 July 1940. They were modified by Shorts to S.26/M military configuration before delivery to the RAF as X8275, X8274 and X8273 respectively. After modification at Rochester, air-to-surface-vessel (ASV) RDF (later called radar) was fitted by Blackburn Aircraft Limited at Dumbarton in Scotland. Following a series of evaluation flights and remedial work to address instability, the conversion work was deemed to be complete during late 1941.

From 1941, the S.26/M flying boats (occasionally referred to as 'G-Boats') served with No. 119 Squadron RAF and No. 10 Squadron RAAF, flying supplies to Gibraltar and the Middle East. Typical cargoes included ammunition and spare parts for Bristol Beaufighters stationed throughout the region. On 20 June 1941, X8274 (Golden Fleece) was lost off Cape Finisterre, when it broke up following a heavy forced landing, due to the simultaneous failure of two engines. In December 1941, Golden Horn and Golden Hind were returned to British Overseas Airways Corporation (BOAC) (created in November 1939 by the merger of Imperial Airways and British Airways Ltd.), and fitted out for 40 passengers in 'austerity' seating, then operated between Britain and Nigeria.

On 9 January 1943, S.26/M Golden Horn was lost over Lisbon when an engine seized and caught fire on a test flight after having received an engine overhaul. Golden Hind was employed on other routes between Britain and West Africa until the end of the conflict, and remained in service with BOAC until retired in 1947. During its postwar years, its wartime austere interior was replaced with first class furnishings, reducing the seating capacity to a maximum of 24 passengers. From 1947 until 1954, it lay moored in Rochester Harbour near its birthplace, where the flying boat had made its first flight. In 1954, Golden Hind ran aground at Harty Ferry on the Isle of Sheppey whilst on tow to a new anchorage. It was eventually scrapped due to hull damage.

== Operators ==
Australia

- Royal Australian Air Force
  - No. 10 Squadron RAAF

United Kingdom

- British Overseas Airways Corporation
- Marine Aircraft Experimental Establishment
- Royal Air Force
  - No. 119 Squadron RAF

== Specifications ==
Data from British Civil Aircraft 1919-1972;Volume III & Concise Guide to British Aircraft of World Warr II

General characteristics

- Crew: 7
- Capacity: 38 passengers
- Length: 101 ft 4 in (30.89 m)
- Wingspan: 134 ft 4 in (40.94 m)
- Height: 37 ft 7 in (11.46 m)
- Wing area: 2,160 sq ft (201 m^{2})
- Empty weight: 37,700 lb (17,100 kg)
- Max takeoff weight: 73,500 lb (33,339 kg)
- Fuel capacity: 3,600 imp gal (4,300 US gal; 16,000 L)
- Powerplant: 4 × Bristol Hercules IV 14-cylinder radial engines, 1,380 hp (1,030 kW) each
- Propellers: 3-bladed DH constant speed, 14 ft 6 in (4.42 m) diameter

Performance

- Maximum speed: 209 mph (336 km/h, 182 kn)
- Cruise speed: 180 mph (290 km/h, 160 kn)
- Range: 3,200 mi (5,100 km, 2,800 nmi)

Armament

- Guns: 2 × dorsal and 1 × tail Boulton Paul BPA Mk. II four-gun turrets
- Bombs:
  - 8 × 500 lb (227 kg) bombs under the wings
  - 20 × reconnaissance flares
  - 28 × flame floats
  - 8 × smoke floats

== See also ==
Related development

- Short Empire

Aircraft of comparable role, configuration, and era

- Boeing 314 Clipper
