= 423 Maritime Helicopter Squadron =

Canadian air force squadron

- Active: 18 May 1942 – 4 September 1945; 1 June 1953 – 31 December 1962; 3 September 1974 – present
- Country: Canada
- Branch: (Canada) Royal Canadian Air Force
- Part of: 12 Wing
- Nickname: Eagle
- Mottos: Latin: Quærimus et petimus ("We search and strike")
- Battle honours: Atlantic, 1942–1945; English Channel and North Sea, 1944–1945; Normandy, 1944; Biscay, 1944; Gulf and Kuwait; Arabian Sea Libya
- Website: www.rcaf-arc.forces.gc.ca/en/squadron/423-squadron.page

Commanders
- Honorary colonel: Frank Wayne Adams

Insignia
- Squadron badge: Argent a bald-headed eagle volant proper wings displayed and inverted, legs and claws extended

423 Maritime Helicopter Squadron (French: 423^{e} Escadron d'hélicoptères maritimes) is a unit of the Canadian Forces under Royal Canadian Air Force. It currently operates the Sikorsky CH-148 Cyclone from Shearwater Heliport at CFB Halifax in Nova Scotia, Canada.

== History ==
No. 423 Squadron RCAF was a World War II unit of the Royal Canadian Air Force. Formed in 1942 in Oban, Argyll, Scotland for General Reconnaissance duties, it later moved to RAF Castle Archdale, Northern Ireland where it flew Sunderland flying boat patrol bombers. It changed to a transport role in 1945 and was disbanded later that year. Re-formed in 1953 at RCAF Station St Hubert (now Montréal/Saint-Hubert Airport) flying the CF-100 in a continental defence role, it was transferred to RCAF Station Grostenquin in 1957 where it replaced No. 416 Squadron which flew Sabres. The squadron was again disbanded in 1962 when the RCAF's CF-100s were removed from service. In 1974, it was re-formed a final time as No. 423 Anti-Submarine Squadron. In 1995 its name was changed to 423 Maritime Helicopter Squadron. It flew CH-124 Sea King helicopter, which it used in support of Royal Canadian Navy (RCN) warships during the 1991 Gulf War and in the Arabian Sea after the 11 September 2001 terrorist attacks. It now operates the Sikorsky CH-148 Cyclone since January 2018.

On 30 April 2020, an RCAF CH-148 from 423 Squadron, attached to HMCS Fredericton and based at the Shearwater Heliport crashed in the Ionian Sea during a NATO Mediterranean exercise. All six crew members aboard the aircraft were killed.
