= No. 422 Squadron RCAF =

No. 422 (Flying Yachtsman) Squadron RCAF
- Active: 1942-1980
- Country: Canada
- Branch: Royal Canadian Air Force
- Nickname(s): Flying Yachtsman; Tomahawk
- Equipment: Canadair CF-104 Starfighter
- Battle honours: Atlantic 1942-45, English Channel and North Sea 1944-45, Normandy 1944, Biscay 1944-45, Arctic 1942.

No. 422 Squadron RCAF was a unit of the Royal Canadian Air Force, formed during World War II.

422 General Reconnaissance Squadron formed at RAF Castle Archdale near Lough Erne, Northern Ireland, in April 1942. It was a flying-boat squadron, flying Cansos and Short Sunderlands to patrol the North Atlantic for German U-boats. They were redesignated a Transport Squadron in June 1945, and disbanded in September 1945.

The squadron was reformed at RCAF Station Uplands in January 1953 as 422 Fighter Squadron. The squadron went to 4 Wing RCAF Station Baden-Soellingen in August 1953, becoming part of the Canadian Armed Forces in 1968. Becoming 422 Fighter Squadron, CAF, it remaining there until deactivation in July 1970.

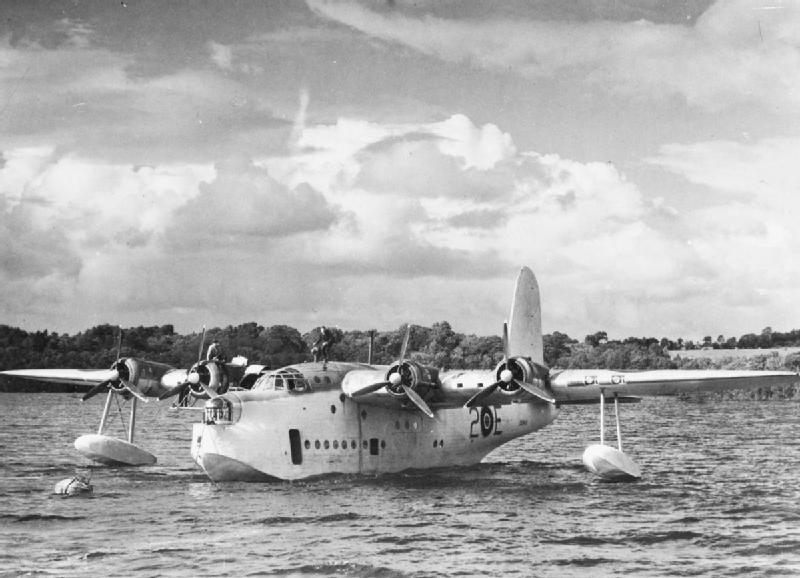
A Short Sunderland flying boat of No. 422 Squadron at Castle Archdale, Northern Ireland

The squadron was reactivated as 422 Tactical Helicopter Squadron in January 1971, and remained a helicopter squadron until it was disbanded in August 1980.

== Aircraft ==
422 General Reconnaissance Squadron

- Saro Lerwick
- Consolidated Canso
- Short Sunderland
- Douglas Dakota
- Consolidated Liberator

422 Fighter Squadron

- de Havilland Vampire
- Canadair F-86 Sabre
- Canadair CF-104 Starfighter

422 Tactical Helicopter Squadron

- Bell CH-135 Twin Huey
- Bell CH-136 Kiowa
