= No. 204 Squadron RAF =

Defunct flying squadron of the Royal Air Force

No 204 Squadron RAF
- Active: Royal Naval Air Service; 23 March 1915 – 15 October 1915; 31 December 1916 – 1 April 1918; Royal Air Force; 1 - April 1918 - 31 December 1919; 1 February 1929 – 30 June 1945; 1 August 1947 – 20 February 1953; 1 January 1954 – 1 April 1971; 1 April 1971 – 1 May 1972
- Country: United Kingdom
- Branch: Royal Air Force
- Mottos: Latin: Praedam mari quaero ("I seek my prey in the sea")
- Battle honours: Home Waters, 1915; Western Front, 1917–18; Atlantic, 1940–45; Norway, 1940; Arctic, 1941

Insignia
- Squadron Badge heraldry: On water barry wavy, a mooring buoy, thereon a cormorant displayed The badge is based upon a photograph made by Aircraftsman T.E. Shaw (Lawrence of Arabia)
- Squadron Codes: RF (Apr 1939 – Sep 1939); KG (Sep 1939 – 1943); T (Jan 1954 – 1956)

No. 204 Squadron was a Royal Air Force unit first formed in March 1915 as No.4 Squadron Royal Naval Air Service.

== First World War ==
No. 4 Squadron Royal Naval Air Service was formed on 25 March 1915 at Dover, Kent, from the former RNAS Defence Flight. In August 1915 the squadron moved to Eastchurch where it was re-designated as No. 4 Wing RNAS. The squadron was reformed on 31 December 1916 at Coudekerque just outside Dunkirk, France to operate the Sopwith 1½ Strutter, a multirole biplane. In March 1917 the squadron re-equipped with the Sopwith Pup biplane fighter aircraft, before it moved to Bray-Dunes, not far away on the French-side of the Franco-Belgian border. In June 1917 the squadron re-equipped again with the Sopwith Camel, a biplane fighter aircraft and Sopwith Pup successor.

In January 1918 the squadron made a temporary move to Walmer in Kent to rest and refit before returning to the front at Bray-Dunes in March 1918. On the formation of the Royal Air Force on 1 April 1918 the squadron was re-designated No. 204 Squadron. The squadron moved around some of the aerodromes around Dunkirk before settling at Téteghem in May 1918. In October 1918 the squadron moved forward to Heule in Flanders until the end of the First World War. In February 1919 its personal returned to RAF Waddington in Lincolnshire, England, before being disbanded in December 1919.

== Reformation ==
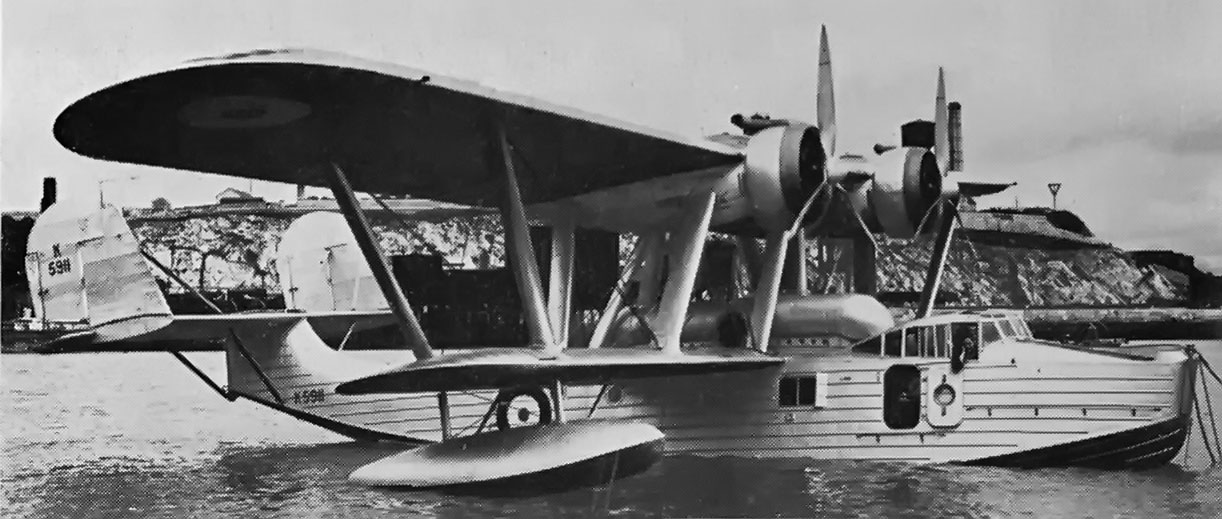
A 204 Squadron Saro London

The squadron was reformed on 1 February 1929, when the coastal reconnaissance flight based at RAF Cattewater (later RAF Mount Batten), Plymouth, equipped with five Supermarine Southampton flying boats, was renumbered. It carried out a regular routine of training, interspersed with a series of formation cruises, including one to the Mediterranean in 1932 and to the Baltic the next year.

It re-equipped with Supermarine Scapa, a general reconnaissance flying boat, to replace the elderly Southampton flying boats from August 1935, and in September, it transferred to Aboukir, in Egypt, as part of the United Kingdom's response to the Italian invasion of Ethiopia, remaining there until August 1936, when the Squadron returned to Plymouth. It again re-equipped, this time with Saro London flying boats, from October that year. The squadron continued its routine of training and formation cruises, visiting Gibraltar in August 1937, and visiting Australia to celebrate the 150th anniversary of the founding of Sydney in 1938, being away from Britain from December 1937 to April 1938.

== Second World War ==
The squadron re-equipped with Short Sunderland monoplane flying boat patrol bombers in June 1939, passing its Saro London biplane flying boats to 240 Squadron. In September 1939, following the start of the Second World War, the squadron began flying convoy escort missions and anti-submarine patrols over the Western approaches. The squadron moved to RAF Sullom Voe, in the Shetland Isles of Scotland, in April 1940, carrying out patrols off the coast of Norway as a result of the German invasion of Norway.

In April 1941 the squadron moved to Reykjavík, Iceland, flying maritime patrols over the North Atlantic for five months. In August the squadron's Short Sunderland flying boats flew to Gibraltar, where they were based for two weeks before moving on to Bathurst (now Banjul), The Gambia to counter the activity of German Navy submarines in the busy shipping lanes off West Africa. It remained at Bathurst until 30 June 1945, when it disbanded.

The squadron lost 19 Short Sunderland flying boats during the Second World War. No Axis submarines were sunk by the squadron, although it did claim at least one Luftwaffe Junkers Ju 88, a multi-role combat aircraft, shot down.

== Transport squadron ==
On 1 August 1947 the squadron was reformed at RAF Station Kabrit, Egypt as a transport squadron and flew Douglas Dakota military transport aircraft, until these were replaced by Vickers Valetta, in July 1949. On 20 February 1953, the squadron was disbanded by being renumbered to No. 84 Squadron RAF.

== Return to maritime operations ==
The squadron was reformed once more on 1 January 1954 at RAF Ballykelly, in County Londonderry, Northern Ireland and was equipped with Avro Shackleton, a long-range maritime patrol aircraft.

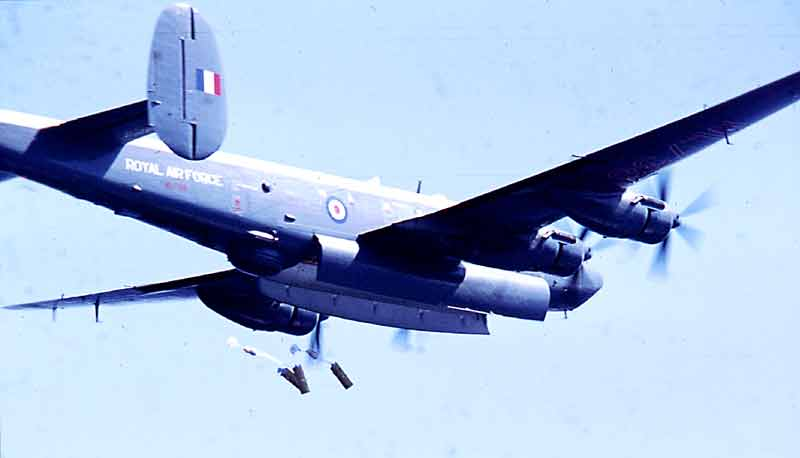
A Shackleton, possibly of 204 sqn, performing a mail drop over Beira street, September 1971, photographed from aboard HMS Minerva

In 1965, Ian Smith's Rhodesian minority white government made a Unilateral Declaration of Independence, leading to United Nations sanctions against what was up until then a British colony. One of the major thrusts of this action was to try and deprive the country of oil. Being land-locked, Rhodesia relied on a pipeline through Mozambique from the port of Beira. Up until 1972, the sanctions were applied by the Royal Navy working with the RAF, which undertook reconnaissance flights of the Beira Straits from its base in Madagascar. The RAF was located at the airfield close to the port of Majunga, on the north-west coast of Madagascar. No. 204 Squadron was the unit tasked with this responsibility, just prior to the evacuation and closure of the base in March 1972. It operated a detachment of two Avro Shackleton Mk.2. The last flight took place on 17 March 1972. The squadron was disbanded on 28 April 1972.

== Aircraft operated ==
Aircraft operated by no. 204 Squadron, data from
From	To	Aircraft	Variant
Mar 1915	Oct 1915	Various	
Dec 1916	Mar 1917	Sopwith 1½ Strutter	
Mar 1917	Jun 1917	Sopwith Pup	
Jun 1917	Feb 1919	Sopwith Camel	
Feb 1929	Oct 1935	Supermarine Southampton	Mk.II
Aug 1935	Jan 1937	Supermarine Scapa	
Oct 1936	Jul 1939	Saro London	Mks. I & II
Jun 1939	Sep 1943	Short Sunderland	Mk.I
Jun 1941	Mar 1943	Short Sunderland	Mk.II
Oct 1942	Jun 1945	Short Sunderland	Mk.III
Apr 1945	Jun 1945	Short Sunderland	Mk.V
Aug 1947	Jul 1949	Douglas Dakota	C.4
May 1949	Feb 1953	Vickers Valetta	C.1
Jan 1954	May 1958	Avro Shackleton	MR.2
May 1958	Feb 1960	Avro Shackleton	MR.1A
May 1959	Apr 1971	Avro Shackleton	MR.2C

== Squadron bases ==
Bases and airfields used by no. 204 Squadron, data from
From	To	Base
23 Mar 1915	3 Aug 1915	Dover, Kent
3 Aug 1915	15 Oct 1915	Eastchurch, Isle of Sheppey, Kent
31 Dec 1916	1 Apr 1917	Coudekerque, Belgium
1 Apr 1917	2 Jan 1918	Bray Dunes, France
2 Jan 1918	6 Mar 1918	Walmer, Kent
6 Mar 1918	13 Apr 1918	Bray Dunes, France
13 Apr 1918	30 Apr 1918	Téteghem, France
30 Apr 1918	9 May 1918	Cappelle, France
9 May 1918	24 Oct 1918	Téteghem, France
24 Oct 1918	11 Feb 1919	Heule (near Kortrijk), Belgium
11 Feb 1919	31 Dec 1919	RAF Waddington, Lincolnshire (as a cadre)
1 Feb 1929	27 Sep 1935	RAF Mount Batten, Devon
27 Sep 1935	22 Oct 1935	RAF Aboukir, Egypt
22 Oct 1935	5 Aug 1936	RAF Alexandria, Egypt
5 Aug 1936	2 Apr 1940	RAF Mount Batten, Devon
2 Apr 1940	5 Apr 1941	RAF Sullom Voe, Shetland
5 Apr 1941	15 Jul 1941	Reykjavík, Iceland
15 Jul 1941	28 Aug 1941	RAF Gibraltar, Gibraltar
28 Aug 1941	28 Jan 1944	Bathurst/Half Die, Gambia (Dets. at Gibraltar; Jui, Sierra Leone and Port-Étienne, Mauritania)
28 Jan 1944	1 Apr 1944	Jui, Sierra Leone (Dets. at Half Die and Port-Étienne)
1 Apr 1944	8 Apr 1944	Half Die, Gambia
8 Apr 1944	30 Jun 1945	Jui, Sierra Leone (Dets. at Half Die, Port-Étienne, Fisherman Lake, Liberia and Abidjan, Ivory Coast)
1 Aug 1947	22 Feb 1951	RAF Kabrit, Egypt
22 Feb 1951	20 Feb 1953	RAF Fayid, Egypt
1 Jan 1954	1 Apr 1971	RAF Ballykelly, County Londonderry, Northern Ireland
1 Apr 1971	28 Apr 1972	RAF Honington, Suffolk (Dets. at Majunga, Madagascar; Tengah, Singapore and Masirah, Oman)

== Commanding officers ==
Officers commanding No. 204 Squadron RAF, data from
From	To	Name
Mar 1917	27 Jul 1918	Squadron Commander B.L. Huskisson
27 Jul 1918	10 Nov 1918	Maj. E.W. Norton
10 Nov 1918	21 Nov 1918	Maj. L.S. Breadner
21 Nov 1918	10 Dec 1918	Maj. E.W. Norton
10 Dec 1918	10 Jan 1919	Maj. P. Huskisson
10 Jan 1919	31 Dec 1919	Maj. R.S. Lucy
1 Feb 1929	9 Dec 1930	S/Ldr. F.H. Laurence, MC
9 Dec 1930	1 Jan 1934	S/Ldr. K.B. Lloyd, AFC
1 Jan 1934	1 Oct 1936	S/Ldr. A.W. Fletcher, DFC, AFC, OBE
1 Oct 1936	19 Oct 1937	S/Ldr. V.P. Feather
19 Oct 1937	18 Mar 1940	W/Cdr. K.B. Lloyd, AFC
18 Mar 1940	14 Aug 1940	W/Cdr. E.S.C. Davies, AFC
14 Aug 1940	22 May 1941	W/Cdr. K.F.T. Pickles
22 May 1941	28 Feb 1943	W/Cdr. D.I. Coote
28 Feb 1943	24 Mar 1943	W/Cdr. P.R. Hatfield
24 Mar 1943	19 Sep 1943	W/Cdr. C.E.V. Evison
19 Sep 1943	17 Aug 1944	W/Cdr. H.J.L. Hawkins
17 Aug 1944	12 Jan 1945	W/Cdr. A. Frame
12 Jan 1945	30 Jun 1945	W/Cdr. D. Michell
1 Aug 1947	15 Jan 1948	S/Ldr. H.S. Hartley
15 Jan 1948	22 May 1950	S/Ldr. R.A. Pegler
22 May 1950	1 Oct 1952	S/Ldr. L.W. Davies
1 Oct 1952	20 Feb 1953	S/Ldr. H.H. Jenkins
1 Jan 1954	25 Jul 1955	S/Ldr. G. Young
25 Jul 1955	3 Jun 1957	W/Cdr. W. Beringer
3 Jun 1957	23 Jul 1958	W/Cdr. A.D. Dart, DSO, DFC
23 Jul 1958	1 Jun 1960	W/Cdr. J.C.W. Weller, DFC
1 Jun 1960	14 Jun 1962	W/Cdr. R.D. Roe, AFC
14 Jun 1962	1 May 1964	W/Cdr. C.K.N. Lloyd, AFC
1 May 1964	7 Mar 1966	W/Cdr. J.J. Duncombe, AFC
7 Mar 1966	17 Jun 1968	W/Cdr. P. Kent, MBE
17 Jun 1968	14 Apr 1969	W/Cdr. O.G. Williams
14 Apr 1969	1 Apr 1971	W/Cdr. E.P. Wild
1 Apr 1971	1 May 1972	S/Ldr. D.E. Leppard
