= USL Dunkerque =

French football club

- Full name: Union Sportive du Littoral de Dunkerque
- Nickname: Les Maritimes (The Seasiders)
- Founded: 1909; 117 years ago as Stade Dunkerquois
- Stadium: Stade Marcel-Tribut
- Capacity: 4,933
- Owner: Amissos Group
- President: Jasper Yildirim
- Head coach: Albert Sánchez
- League: Ligue 2
- 2025–26: Ligue 2, 10th of 18
- Website: usldunkerque.com
Home colours	Away colours

Union Sportive du Littoral de Dunkerque (French pronunciation: [ynjɔ̃ spɔʁtiv dy litɔʁal də dœ̃kɛʁk]) is a football club based in Dunkirk, France. It competes in Ligue 2, having achieved promotion from the Championnat National in the 2022–23 season. The club colours are blue and white, and home matches are played at the Stade Marcel-Tribut.

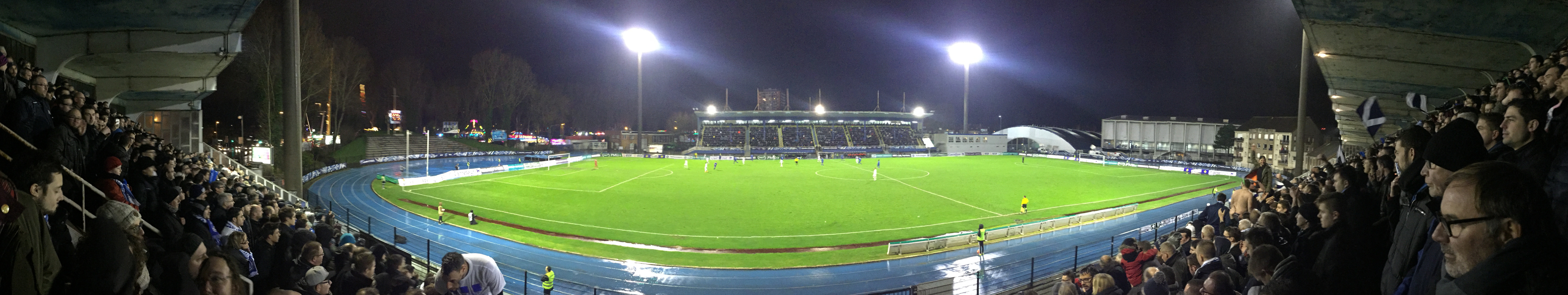
USL Dunkerque home Stadium Stade Marcel-Tribut

The club was founded in 1909 under the name of Union Sportive Dunkerque-Malo from a merger of two local teams, Stade Dunkerquois and Union Sportive de Malo-les-Bains. The latter, founded in 1900, had been the most widely supported club in the Dunkirk area and was based in the neighbouring town of Malo-les-Bains (later annexed by the city of Dunkirk in 1970). US Dunkerque-Malo then became Union Racing Dunkerque-Malo after merging with Racing Club de Dunkerque in 1927, Olympique Dunkerquois after merging with Amis de la Balle Dunkerquoise in 1933 and Union Sportive de Dunkerque after merging with Dunkerque Étudiant Club in 1954. The club adopted its current name of Union Sportive du Littoral de Dunkerque in 1987 after receiving the financial support of the communauté urbaine of Dunkirk Grand Littoral.

Dunkerque gained professional status in 1935 and played in Division 2 until the outbreak of the Second World War in 1939. The club relaunched following the war as part of the regional leagues, gaining promotion to the Division d'Honneur in 1958 and the Championnat de France Amateur (CFA) in 1960. It was promoted back to Division 2 in 1966, regaining its professional status, and remained in the league for 30 years.

In 1996, Dunkerque was relegated to the Championnat National and then the Championnat National 2 one year later. The club would even make several appearances the Championnat National 3, the fifth tier of French football, before finally making its way back to the Championnat National in 2013 and Ligue 2 in 2020. Dunkerque briefly returned to the National in 2021–22 before being purchased by the Amissos group, owned by Turkish businessman Yüksel Yildirim in 2023. As of the 2025–26 season, the club plays in Ligue 2.

== History ==
=== Predecessors (1900–1949) ===
In March of 1899, Dunkirk resident Marcel Tribut introduced football to a group of his friends after discovering the sport during a visit to his uncle in Scotland. Together, they founded Union Sportive de Malo-les-Bains in March of 1900, playing home matches on a military training ground in Dunkirk's Glacis neighbourhood. The club initially competed in the USFSA Championnat du Nord.

It was also at this time that rowing club Sporting Dunkerquois created a football department. The first local derby between the two teams was played on November 17th, 1901 and was won 2–0 by Sporting. By the 1904–05 season, the two clubs had merged and begun competing in the colours of US Malo-les-Bains.

In January of 1909, Dunkerquois athlete Louis Blondel founded a multi-sport club focused on football named Cercle Olympique Dunkerquois. Blondel was formerly a member of USFSA's Nord Committee and secretary at US Malo-les-Bains, which at the time competed in the top tier of the Championnat du Nord's Maritime group. Cercle Olympique Dunkerquois quickly grew to a size of about 30 members and played its first friendly match against US Malo-les-Bains on March 21st, 1909, losing 3–0.

At the same time, another local sportsman named Henri Ferrari was about to found his own football club when he met Louis Blondel. The two instead decided to recruit breakaway players from US Malo-les-Bains to CO Dunkerquois, renaming the club Stade Dunkerquois in May of 1909. The new club elected Paul Capelle as its first chairman and obtained the backing of Dunkirk's mayor and sub-prefect. Over the next two years, Stade Dunkerquois set about building a new stadium, Stade de la Victoire, which opened on April 16th, 1911. The occasion was marked by a sports festival featuring a match against London's Leyton Manor Football Club, who defeated the home side 4−2.

Stade Dunkerquois began its inaugural 1909–10 season in the second tier of the Championnat du Nord while US Malo-les-Bains continued to play in the top tier. It was in this league that the Malouins recorded a famous 3–2 win over five-time champions of France Racing Club de Roubaix on January 30th, 1910, the last day of the season. The 1912–13 season saw the club relegated to the second tier, where they won their first derby 5–2 against Stade Dunkerquois on November 23rd, 1913. US Malo-les-Bains also ran out 3–1 winners in the reverse fixture on February 15th the following year, despite having only eight players available for selection. The result assured the team a first-place finish in the league table, while Stade Dunkerquois ended the season in fifth. The Malouins were thus promoted back to the top tier for the 1914–15 season, which was subsequently suspended due to the outbreak of the First World War.

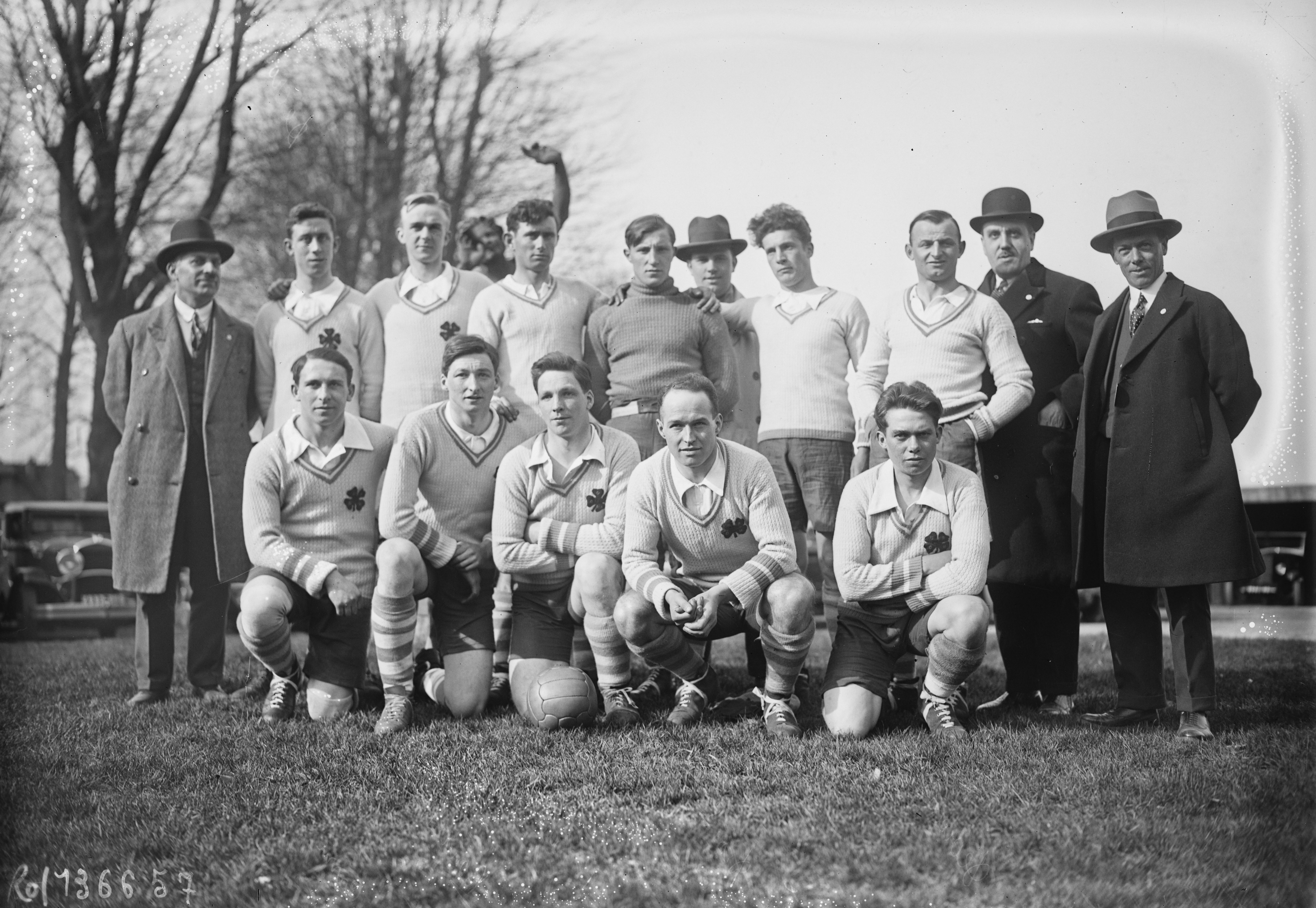
US Dunkerque-Malo's starting lineup against FC Sète in the semifinal of the 1928–29 Coupe de France. From the left, standing wearing sweatshirts: Decrocq, Jansen, Gianelloni, Longuemaere and Hebben. Front row from the left: Carru, P. Bondois, A. Bondois, Dron and Devriendt.

=== Founding of US Dunkerque-Malo and acquisition of professional status (1919–1945) ===
Following the end of the war, US Malo-les-Bains and Stade Dunkerquois merged to form Union Sportive Dunkerque-Malo (USDM) in August of 1919. The new club entered the Division d'Honneur and finished eighth in its inaugural 1919–20 season. It was then assigned to Group C of the competition for the 1921−22 season before being dropped for unknown reasons the following season after the Division d'Honneur was reduced in size from 16 to eight clubs. In the Coupe de France, USDM qualified for the Round of 16 in 1923 and 1927 and the Round of 32 in 1922 and 1924.

US Dunkerque-Malo merged with Racing Club de Dunkerque to form Union Racing Dunkerque-Malo after the 1926–27 season. The new team boasted several highly rated players within its ranks, including goalkeeper Lucien Gianelloni, the Bondois brothers and Louis Dron. The 1928–29 season saw Dunkerque make its deepest run yet in the Coupe de France, defeating US Suisse, Excelsior AC and US Bologne to set up a semifinal tie with FC Sète. It was at this stage that the Dunkerquois would bow out of the competition, suffering a 2–1 loss following a Sétois goal in the 87th minute. The following season, Dunkerque would reach the quarterfinal in the Coupe de France and then the Round of 16 the year after.

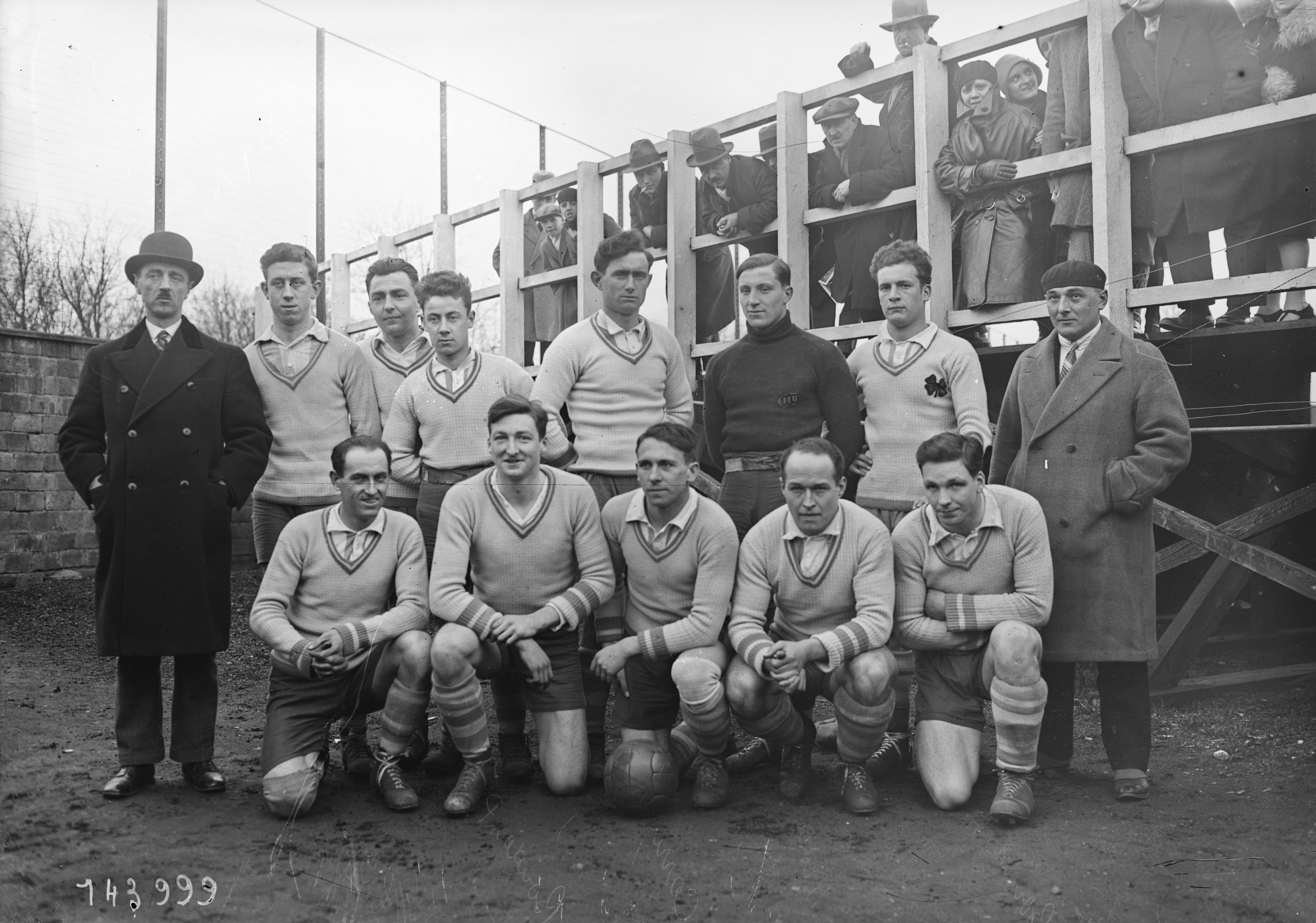
Dunkerque's lineup against AS Cannes in the Round of 16 of the 1929–30 Coupe de France.

In September of 1934, Union Racing Dunkerque-Malo again merged with Le Club des Amis de la Balle Dunkerquoise to form Olympique de Dunkerque. The merger formally came into effect on October 14th, 1934, and the club entered the second tier of the regional leagues. Though it only finished eighth out of ten teams in the Division d'Honneur, Dunkerque was admitted to Division 2 in 1935 and gained professional status as a result. In 1937, the club again made a deep run in the Coupe de France to reach the quarterfinals. Unfortunately, the Second World War would devastate Dunkirk, destroying Dunkerque's stadium and killing many of its players and staff, severely weakening the club.

=== Postwar reconstruction (1945–1966) ===
On Match 9th, 1945, Dunkirk became the last city in France to be liberated by the Allies. The club was forced to rebuild from the ground up, remaining inactive until it was relaunched by manager Émilien Meresse in 1950. In 1954, Olympique de Dunkerque, then playing in the Première Division Maritime, merged with Dunkerque Étudiant Club to form Union Sportive de Dunkerque. The latter would be promoted to the Division d'Honneur in 1958 and the Championnat de France Amateur (CFA) in 1960. Dunkerque finished sixth out of fourteen teams in its first season in the competition and won the Nord-Pas-de-Calais group the season after, finishing five points clear of AS Aulnoye. Following a third-place finish in the 1965–1966 season, the club successfully applied to regain its professional status and was promoted to Division 2 alongside Entente Chaumont AC.

=== Division 2 (1966–1996) ===
Dunkerque finished 14th out of 18 clubs in its first season back in Division 2 and rose to 11th in the 1967–68 season. It also reached the quarterfinals of the Coupe de France in 1968 and 1971, losing to US Quevilly and Olympique Lyonnais respectively. In the 1978–79 season, Dunkerque finished third in Division 2, representing its highest ever finish in the second tier and narrowly missing out on promotion to Division 1. The club then experienced financial struggles that forced it to file for bankruptcy in 1987. Fortunately, it survived thanks to support from the Communauté urbaine de Dunkerque, whereupon the club adopted its current name of Union Sportive du Littoral de Dunkerque.

In 1990, Dunkerque became embroiled in a legal battle with RFC Liège over the signing of Jean-Marc Bosman. Bosman wanted to join Dunkerque at the end of his contract with RFC Liège, but the latter refused to release him after the French club refused to pay its requested transfer fee. The controversy concluded with the European Court of Justice issuing the Bosman ruling, a landmark decision allowing EU players to join other clubs on a free transfer upon the end of their contracts and banning quotas for foreign players.

=== Decline and relegation to the CFA (1996–2001) ===
Dunkerque was relegated to the National 1 in 1996 and the CFA in 1997 after the National 1 was reformed to only retain the top seven teams of each group. The club dropped further to the CFA 2 in 2002 before being promoted back to the CFA the very next season through the playoffs. The 2008–09 season saw manager Nicolas Huysman guide the Maritimes to the round of 32 of the Coupe de France, eliminating Ligue 2 sides Stade de Reims and Montpellier before being knocked out by Lille. Club chairman Jo Dairin stepped down at the end of the season, having overseen Dunkerque since 2002, and was replaced by DK'Bus Marine CEO Christophe Géhin.

Dunkerque celebrated their centenary on May 1st, 2009, marking the occasion by introducing a commemorative blue home kit with thin white stripes and a white away kit with black stripes as well as a special crest for the following season. In addition, a new club store was opened at the Stade Marcel-Tribut and local athletes and sports clubs were invited to every home game. The club and local newspaper Le Phare dunkerquois also named midfielder Jocelyn Blanchard as their player of the century, having made his debut in Division 2 at the age of 18 in 1990 before forging a successful career at Dunkerque, Metz, Juventus, Lens, Austria Wien and Austria Kärnten. Unfortunately, Dunkerque was again relegated to the CFA 2 at the end of the 2009–10 season. They then finished second in their group and immediately returned to the CFA in 2011.

=== Return to professional football (2010–2023) ===
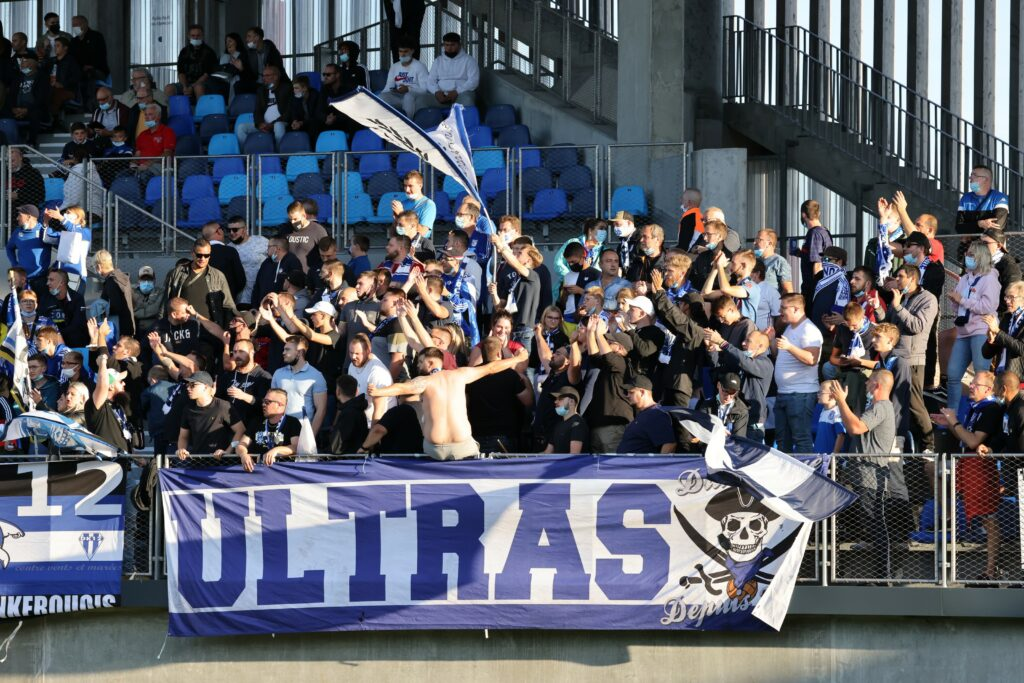
Dunkerque supporters at a Ligue 2 match against AS Nancy Lorraine in 2021

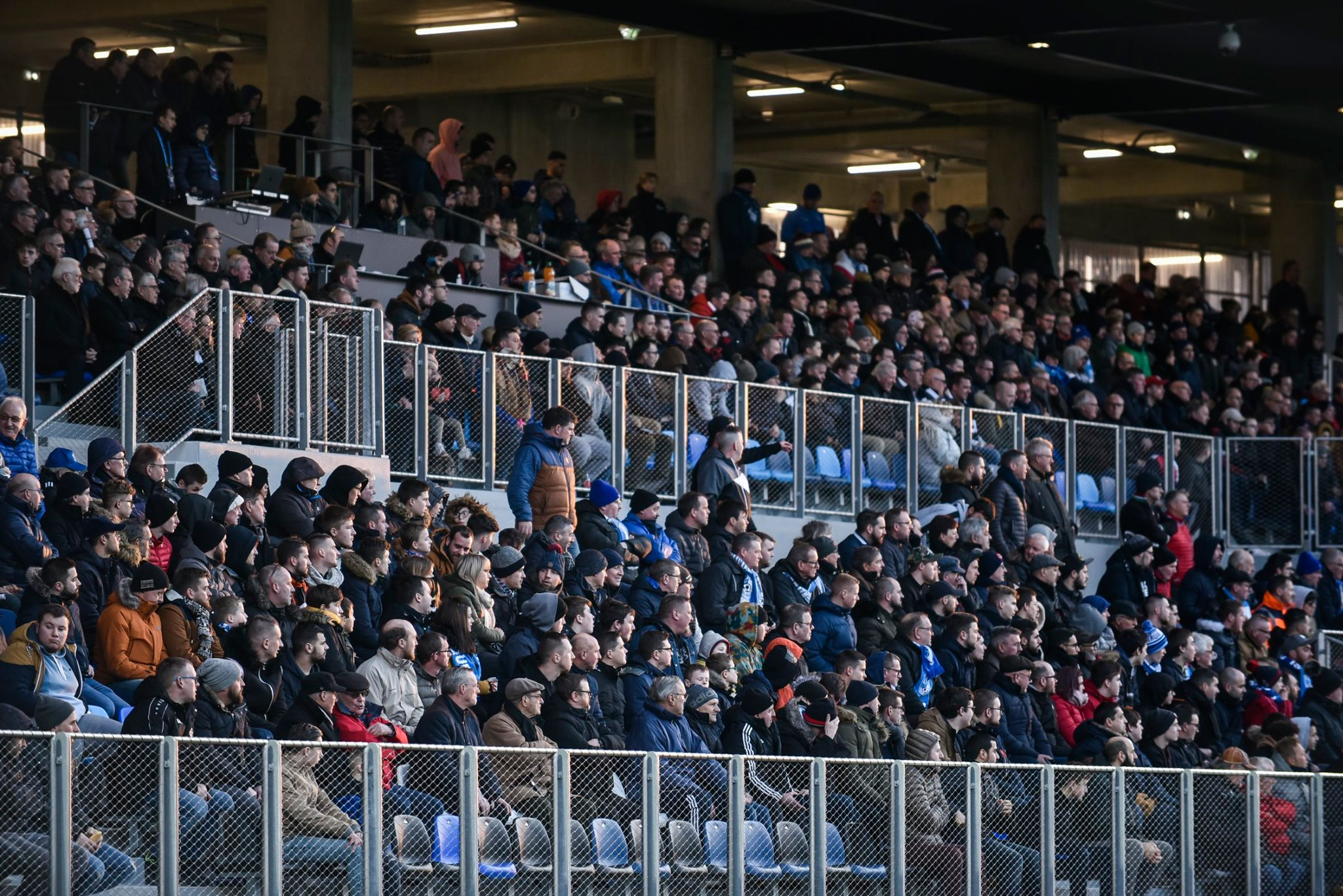
Supporters at a Ligue 2 match in 2021

Huysman's Dunkerque finished second in Group A of the 2010–11 CFA 2 and was promoted to the CFA as one of the five best second-placed teams. The club then finished third in the 2011–12 CFA, ending the season with an 18-game unbeaten streak. This rapid rise culminated in the Maritimes winning promotion to the Championnat National in 2013, returning to the third division after a 16-year absence.

Dunkerque finished second in the truncated 2019–20 Championnat National and were promoted to Ligue 2, 24 years after their relegation from the division in 1996. This success was not without controversy, as their rivals US Boulogne finished third but were denied the opportunity to participate in the promotion playoffs due to the COVID-19 pandemic. During its first season back in the second tier, Dunkerque was administratively relegated by the Direction Nationale du Contrôle de Gestion due to financial difficulties. The club, however, appealed the decision and was ultimately allowed to stay in Ligue 2, finishing 16th at the end of the season.

The 2021–22 season saw Dunkerque fall to 19th in the table, sealing its relegation to the Championnat National. Chairman Jean-Pierre Scouarnec subsequently resigned on December 5th, 2022 and was replaced by Edwin Pindi. The Maritimes would not stay long in the National, finishing second in its 2022–23 edition and immediately returning to Ligue 2. In June of 2023, Scouarnec was arrested following allegations of embezzlement by the Communauté urbaine de Dunkerque.

=== Amissos era (2023–present) ===
On July 4th, 2023, following several months of negotiations, USL Dunkerque was taken over by the Amissos group, which acquired 85 percent of the club. The group was led by Turkish businessman Yüksel Yıldırım and already owned Süper Lig club Samsunspor. Amissos retained Pindi as CEO of the club while bringing in former footballer Demba Ba as sporting advisor, soon promoting him to sporting director. The new ownership also prioritized continuity in the transfer market, with Leverton Pierre being the only player to depart in the summer of 2023.

Dunkerque experienced a difficult start to the 2023–24 Ligue 2 season, recording only one win in their opening seven matches. Manager Mathieu Chabert was sacked in September with the team lying in 17th and replaced with Luis Castro on Ba's advice. The club had sunk to the bottom of the table by December before going unbeaten from matchday 20 to 29 to finish 16th with 46 points. This was followed by Castro and centre-forward Gaëtan Courtet extending their contracts to 2026 and 2025 respectively. Dunkerque then achieved a fourth-placed finish in the 2024–25 season, narrowly losing the play-off semifinal to Metz after a 93rd-minute own goal. In the Coupe de France, the Maritimes upset Ligue 1 clubs Auxerre, Lille and Brest to reach the semifinals for the first time since 1929. Facing Paris Saint-Germain at the Stade Pierre-Mauroy, Dunkerque took a shock 2–0 lead before ultimately losing 4–2 to the French champions.

== Name changes ==
- 1909–1919: Stade Dunkerquois
- 1919–1927: Union Sportive Dunkerque-Malo
- 1927–1934: Union Racing Dunkerque-Malo
- 1934–1954: Olympique Dunkerquois
- 1954–1987: Union Sportive de Dunkerque
- 1987–present: Union Sportive du Littoral de Dunkerque

== Current squad ==
As of 14 September 2026.

Note: Flags indicate national team as defined under FIFA eligibility rules; some limited exceptions apply. Players may hold more than one non-FIFA nationality.

No.	Pos.	Nation	Player
2	DF	FRA	Ousmane Touré (on loan from Lille)
4	DF	BEL	Bram Lagae
6	MF	FRA	Jordan Morel
7	FW	TUN	Khalil Ayari (on loan from Paris Saint-Germain)
9	FW	FRA	Gaëtan Robail
10	MF	FRA	Adrien Lebeau
11	MF	RUS	Yegor Prutsev
15	MF	FRA	Steven Nzonzi
16	GK	FRA	Maxence Prévot
17	FW	SEN	Pape Malick Dieng
18	MF	FRA	Théna Massock
19	FW	FRA	Souleymane Keita
21	DF	CGO	Lenny Dziki Loussilaho

No.	Pos.	Nation	Player
22	DF	COD	Victor Mayela
23	FW	CIV	Arthylio Nadé
24	DF	FRA	Lenny Vallier
25	MF	CMR	Franck Atoen (on loan from Samsunspor)
26	DF	GBS	Opa Sanganté
27	DF	FRA	Allan Linguet
30	DF	BRA	Abner
36	GK	SEN	Mouhamed Sissokho
42	DF	FRA	Maedine Makhloufi
73	GK	ESP	Moha Ramos
93	FW	FRA	Alex Daho
94	FW	FRA	Enzo Mayilla
99	FW	SEN	M'Baye Niang

=== Out on loan ===
Note: Flags indicate national team as defined under FIFA eligibility rules; some limited exceptions apply. Players may hold more than one non-FIFA nationality.

No.	Pos.	Nation	Player
—	FW	FRA	Zaid Seha (at Aubagne Air Bel until 30 June 2027)

== Honours ==
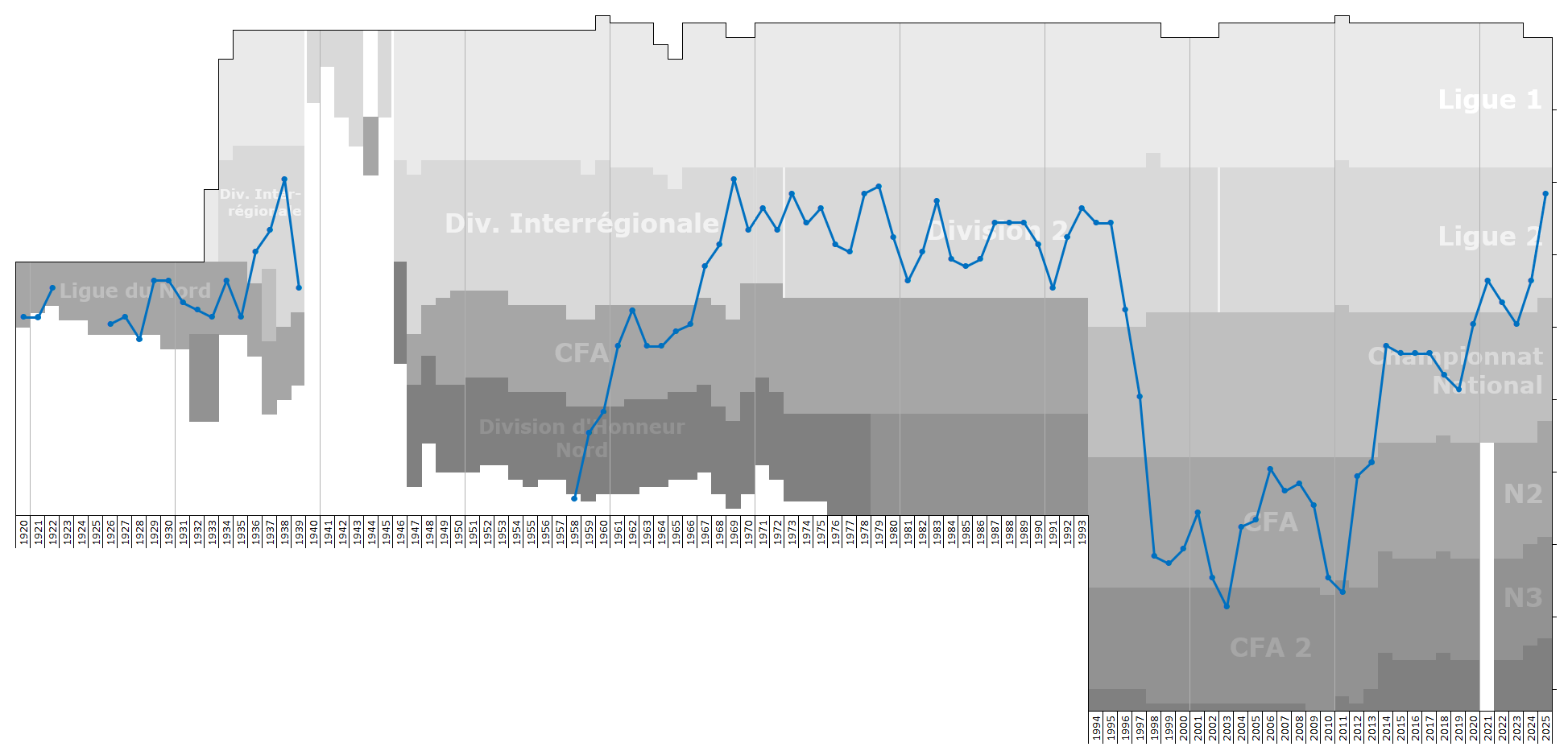
Historical league performance chart of USL Dunkerque

- National 1 / Championnat National
  - Runners-up: 2019–20, 2022–23
- Championnat de France Amateur / National 2 / Championnat National 2
  - Champions: 2012–13
- Championnat de France Amateur (1935–1971)
  - North group winners: 1961–62
- Régional 1 / Division d'Honneur
  - Nord-Pas-de-Calais group winners: 1959–1960
