= Coudekerque-Village =

Commune in Nord, France

Coudekerque-Village Koudekerke-Dorp, Koukerke (West Flemish)
- Part of Téteghem-Coudekerque-Village
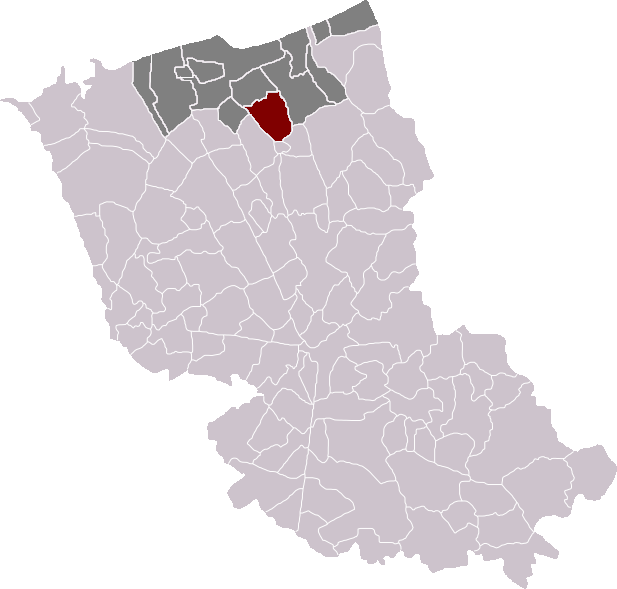
- Location of Coudekerque-Village in the arrondissement of Dunkirk
- Location of Coudekerque-Village
- Location within France Location within Hauts-de-France
- Coordinates: 50°59′42″N 2°25′01″E
- Country: France
- Region: Hauts-de-France
- Department: Nord
- Arrondissement: Dunkerque
- Canton: Coudekerque-Branche
- Commune: Téteghem-Coudekerque-Village
- Area^{1}: 12.03 km^{2} (4.64 sq mi)
- Elevation: 1 m (3.3 ft)
- Highest elevation: 13 m (43 ft)
- Lowest elevation: 0 m (0 ft)
- Population (2022): 1,378
  - Density: 114.5/km^{2} (296.7/sq mi)
- Time zone: UTC+01:00 (CET)
  - Summer (DST): UTC+02:00 (CEST)
- Postal code: 59380
- ^{1} French Land Register data, which excludes lakes, ponds, glaciers > 1 km^{2} (0.386 sq mi or 247 acres) and river estuaries.

Coudekerque-Village (Dutch: Koudekerke-Dorp; West Flemish: Koukerke-Dorp) is a former commune of the Nord department in northern France. On 1 January 2016, it was merged into the new commune Téteghem-Coudekerque-Village. Prior to October 6, 2008, it was known as Coudekerque (Koudekerke). The name was changed to distinguish it from Coudekerque-Branche.

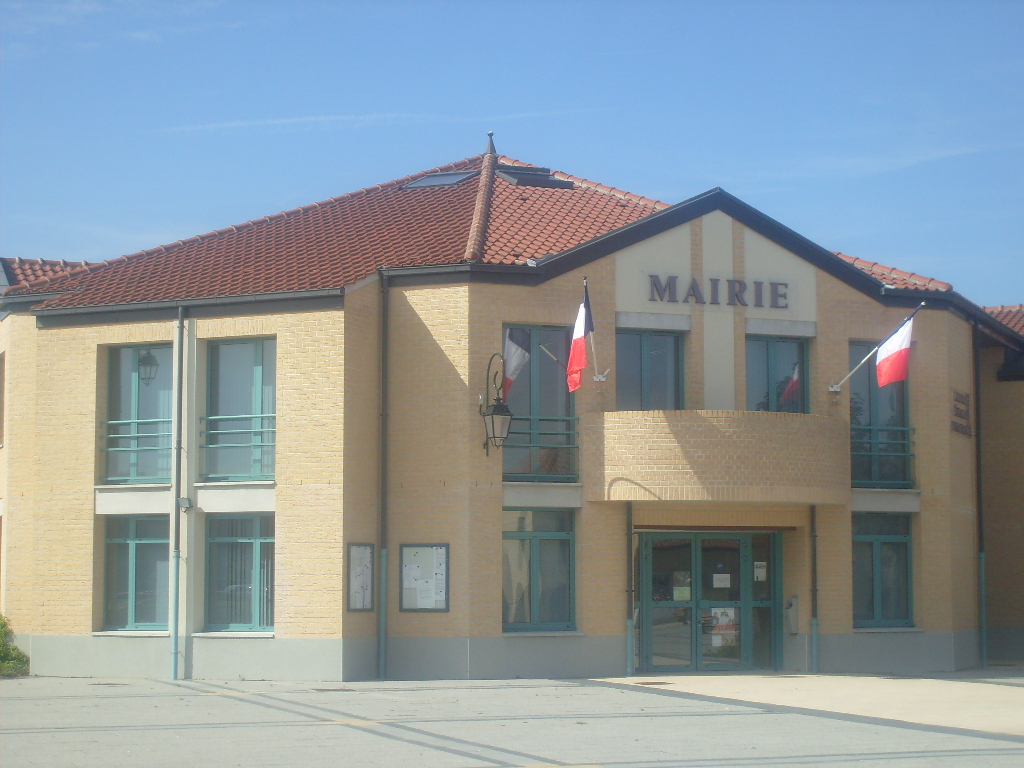
Town hall

== Heraldry ==
Arms of Coudekerque-Village	The arms of Coudekerque-Village are blazoned : Argent, an eagle sable, langued gules.

== See also ==
- Communes of the Nord department
