= Hôtel de Ville, Coudekerque-Branche =

Town hall in Coudekerque-Branche, France

Hôtel de Ville
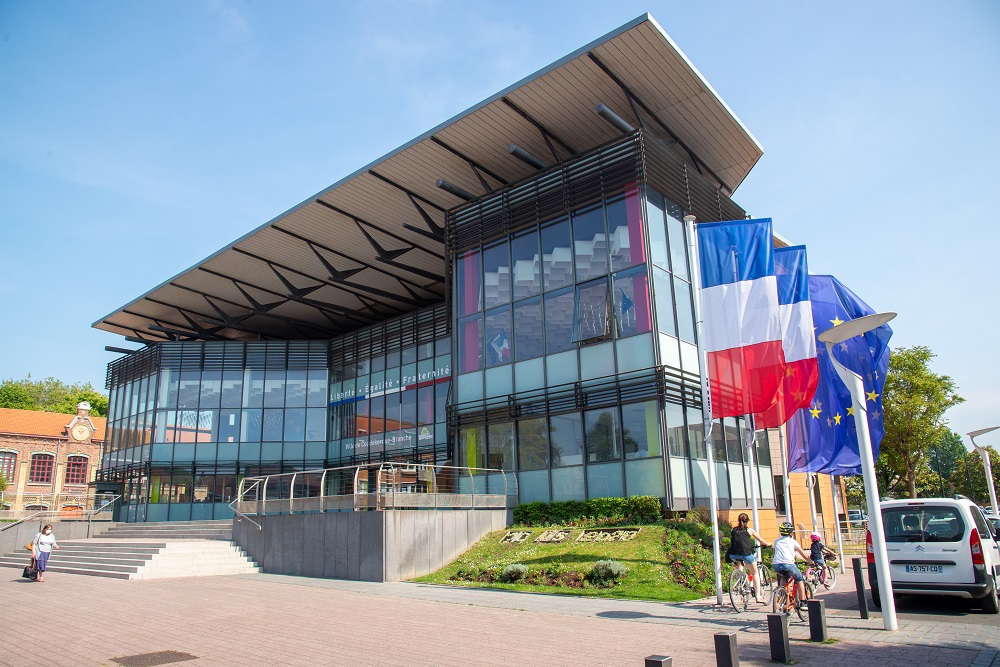
- The main frontage of the Hôtel de Ville in May 2020

General information
- Type: City hall
- Architectural style: Modern style
- Location: Coudekerque-Branche, France
- Coordinates: 51.0186°N 2.3810°E
- Completed: 1980

The Hôtel de Ville (French pronunciation: [otɛl də vil], City Hall) is a municipal building in Coudekerque-Branche, Nord, in northern France, standing on Place de la République.

== History ==
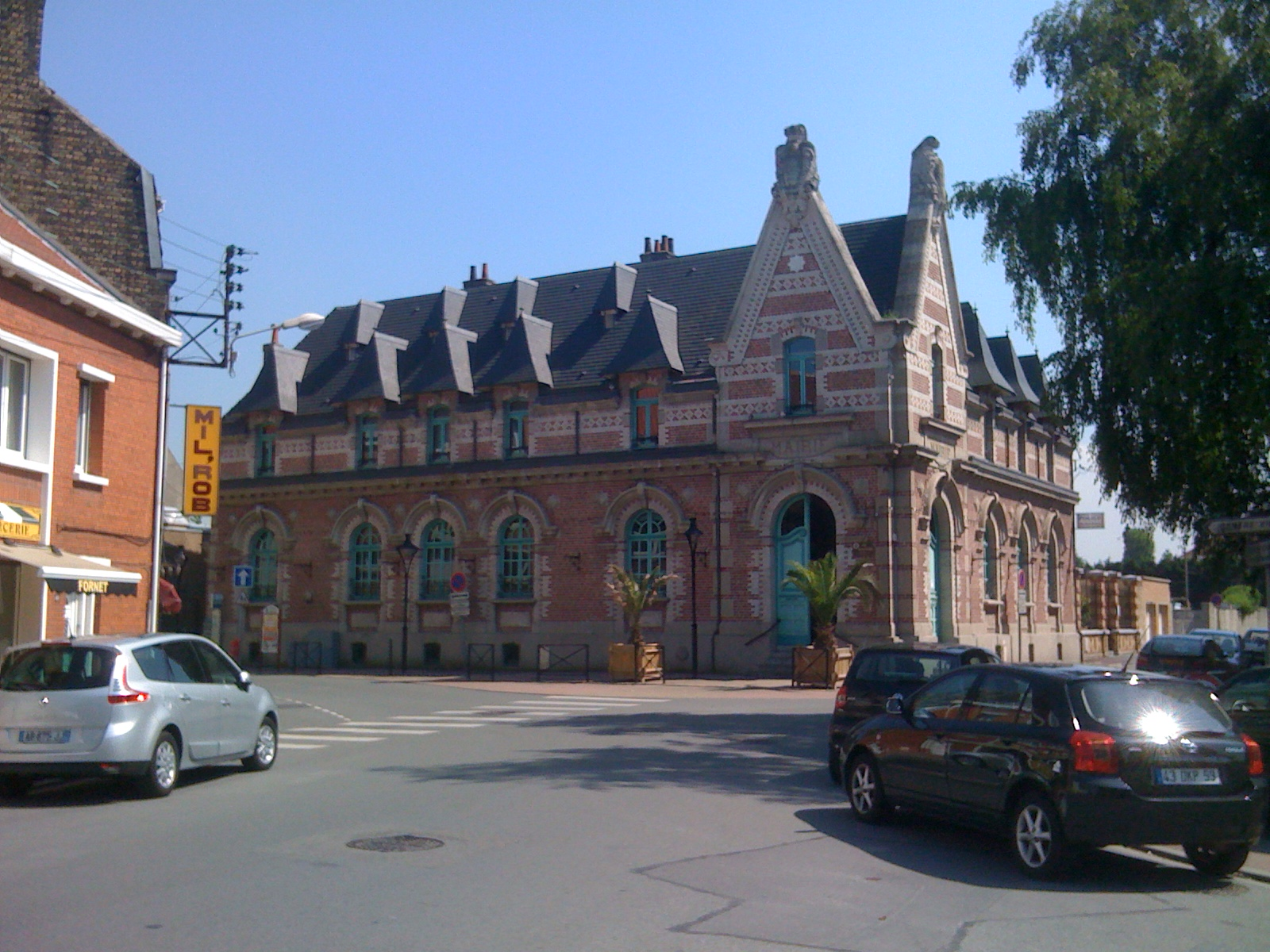
The old town hall

Following the French Revolution, the new town council initially met in the home of the mayor at the time. This arrangement continued until the mid-19th century when the council established a modest municipal office in a building on what is now Rue de l'Ancienne Mairie near Petit-Steendam on the east side of the town.

By the early 20th century, the old municipal office was dilapidated and the council led by the mayor, Gustave Fontaine, decided to commission a purpose-built town hall. The site they selected was on the corner of the streets that are now Rue Gustave Fontaine and Rue Gabriel Péri on the west side of the Bergues Canal. The new building was designed by Arthur Gontier in the Flemish Renaissance Revival style, built in red and white bricks with stone finishings and was officially opened on 6 October 1907.

The design involved an asymmetrical main frontage of six bays facing onto what is now Rue Gustave Fontaine. The right-hand bay featured a round-headed doorway with a hood mould and a keystone on the ground floor, a segmental-headed window with a keystone on the first floor, and a gable with a finial above. The other bays were fenestrated by round-headed windows with hood moulds and keystones on the ground floor and by segmental-headed windows with pyramid-shaped roofs of the first floor. After the building was no longer required for use as the main town hall, it became the annex town hall for the west part of the town. A paved forecourt was later established in front of the building.

During the Second World War, the town hall, like the rest of the town, was occupied by German forces and, as part of the Dunkirk Pocket, was not liberated by allied forces until 9 May 1945.

In the mid-1970s, following significant population growth, the council led by the mayor, André Delattre, decided to commission a modern building. The site they selected was on the south side Place de la République on the east side of the canal. Many buildings which had previously surrounded the square were demolished to facilitate the development. The new building was designed in the modern style, built in concrete and glass and was completed in 1980.

The design involved a symmetrical main frontage in three sections facing onto the square. The central section of eight bays featured a short flight of steps leading up to a four-bay glass entrance. The outer sections were canted forward, with the outer bays of these sections facing onto the square. The whole frontage, other than the entrance, was clad in glass panels and, at roof level, there was a large canopy which was cantilevered out over the pavement with support from metal poles. Spotlights were installed allowing the central part of the canopy to be lit up in the colours of the French tricolour in the evenings. Internally, the principal room was the Salle du Conseil (council chamber) on the first floor.

In September 2026, the council received a technical assessment which raised significant concerns about the condition of the building. The council confirmed that remedial work to bring the building up to the necessary condition standards would be commissioned without delay.
