= Gravelines =

Gravelines Grevelingen (Dutch)
- Commune
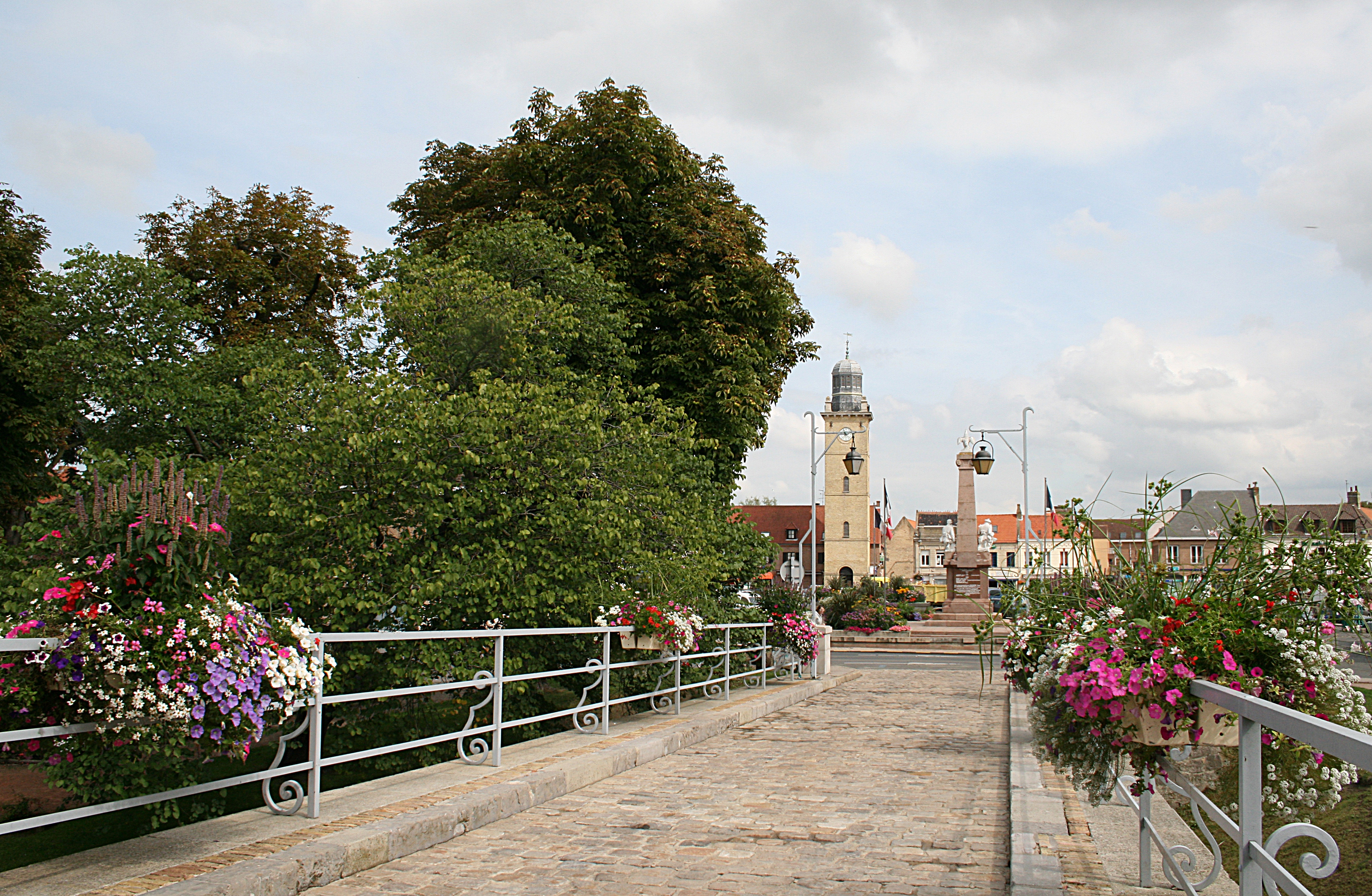
- Place Charles Valentin

- Coat of arms
- Location of Gravelines
- Location within France Location within Hauts-de-France
- Coordinates: 50°59′09″N 2°07′42″E
- Country: France
- Region: Hauts-de-France
- Department: Nord
- Arrondissement: Dunkerque
- Canton: Grande-Synthe
- Intercommunality: CU Dunkerque

Government
  - Mayor (2020–2026): Bertrand Ringot
- Area^{1}: 22.66 km^{2} (8.75 sq mi)
- Elevation: 3 m (9.8 ft)
- Highest elevation: 25 m (82 ft)
- Lowest elevation: 0 m (0 ft)
- Population (2023): 11,430
  - Density: 504.4/km^{2} (1,306/sq mi)
- Demonym: Gravelinois
- Time zone: UTC+01:00 (CET)
  - Summer (DST): UTC+02:00 (CEST)
- INSEE/Postal code: 59273 /59820
- ^{1} French Land Register data, which excludes lakes, ponds, glaciers > 1 km^{2} (0.386 sq mi or 247 acres) and river estuaries.

Gravelines (/ɡrævˈliːn/ grav-LEEN, French: [ɡʁavlin]; Dutch: Grevelingen [ˈɣreːvəlɪŋə(n)]) is a commune in the Nord department in Northern France. It lies at the mouth of the river Aa 15 miles (24 km) southwest of Dunkirk. It was formed in the 12th century around the mouth of a canal built to connect Saint-Omer with the sea. As it was on the western borders of Spanish territory in Flanders it became heavily fortified, some of which remains.

There is a market in the town square (Place Charles Valentin) on Fridays. The "Arsenal" approached from the town square is home to an extensive and carefully displayed art collection. There are modern bronze statues in the grounds. The town is also home to French basketball club BCM Gravelines.

The Gravelines Belfry is one of 56 belfries of Belgium and France that is inscribed on the UNESCO World Heritage List in recognition of its architecture and importance in the history of municipal power in the region.

== History ==
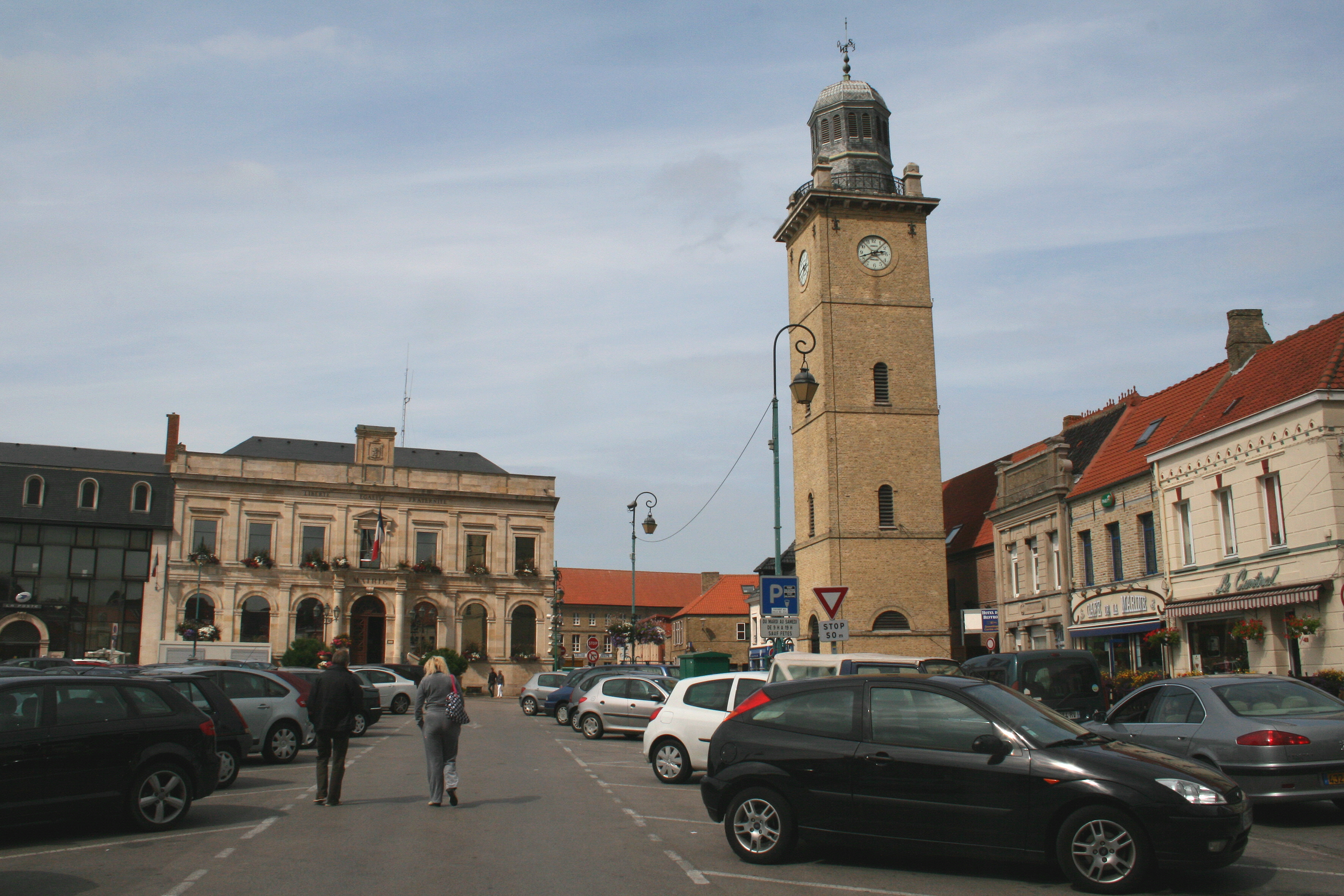
Gravelines Belfry, one of 56 listed Belfries of Belgium and France.

In the early 12th century, Saint-Omer was an important port in western Flanders. Silting gradually cut it off from the North Sea, resulting in the construction of a canal to the new coast at what is now Gravelines. The name is derived from the Dutch Gravenenga, meaning Count's Canal. The new town became heavily fortified as it guarded the western borders of Spanish territory in Flanders.

Gravelines was taken by Henry le Despenser's English forces during the Norwich Crusade of 1383 and was that year destroyed on his orders as the English retreated towards Calais.

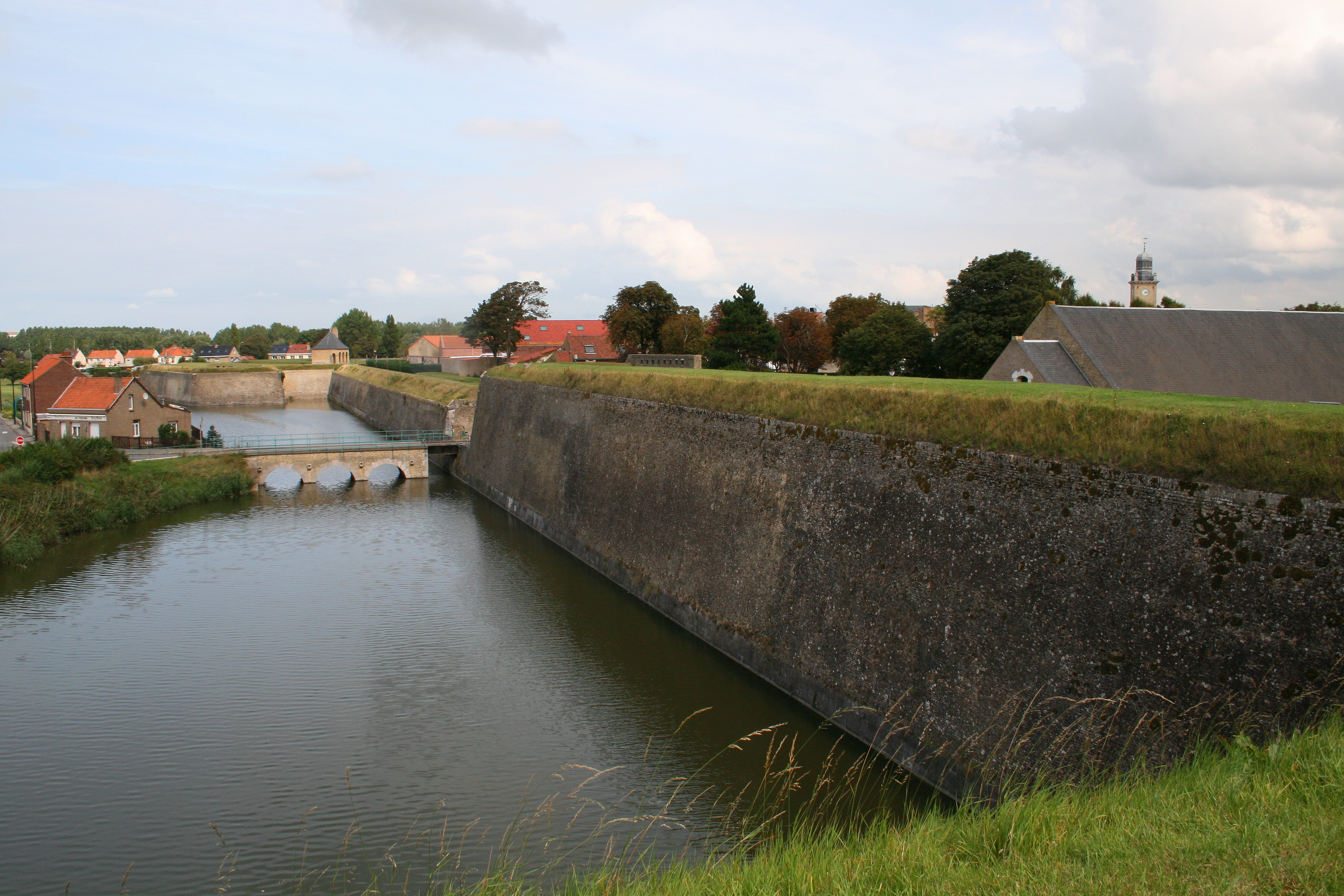
The moat, the drawbridge, the western walls and the bastion of the Mill

There was a famous meeting at Gravelines in 1520, between the Holy Roman Emperor Charles V and Henry VIII of England. There were two battles fought nearby: the first was a land battle in 1558 resulting in a victory by Spanish forces of Lamoral, Count of Egmont over the French under Marshal Paul des Thermes, while the second was a naval attack using fire ships in 1588 launched by England's Royal Navy under Lord Howard against the Spanish Armada at anchor. Gravelines was also the setting for Sir Philip Sidney's failure to deliver the town from Spanish occupation in July 1586, which is described in the anonymous A Discourse of the enterprise of Gravelines.

The town was captured and recaptured several times by the French and Spanish between 1639 and 1658. It was finally annexed to France in the Treaty of the Pyrenees of 1659.

Only in the 19th century did the population become entirely French-speaking.

On 24 May 1940, during the Fall of France, German field marshal Gerd von Rundstedt, commanding Army Group A, ordered his armoured divisions to close up the "Canal Line" of Lens-Gravelines, and halt there.

== Population ==
Historical population
Year	Pop.	±% p.a.
1968	8,167	—
1975	9,039	+1.46%
1982	11,576	+3.60%
1990	12,336	+0.80%
1999	12,430	+0.08%
2007	11,705	−0.75%
2012	11,573	−0.23%
2017	11,166	−0.71%
2023	11,430	+0.39%
Source: INSEE

== Twin towns ==
- Biblis, Germany
- Fjardabyggd, Iceland
- (United Kingdom) Dartford, England

The charter between Dartford and Gravelines was signed in Gravelines on 22 September 1991 by The Mayor, Councillor Tony Gillham, on behalf of Dartford Borough Council and Councillor A. May on behalf of the Dartford and District Twinning Association together with The Mayor of Gravelines, Monsieur A. Denvers and Monsieur C. Marquis, Chairman of their Jumelage (which is Gravelines' equivalent to Dartford's Twinning Association).

== Economy ==
Today, the small town is famous for its nuclear energy plant. It also hosts two OVH data centers, GRA-1 and GRA-2.

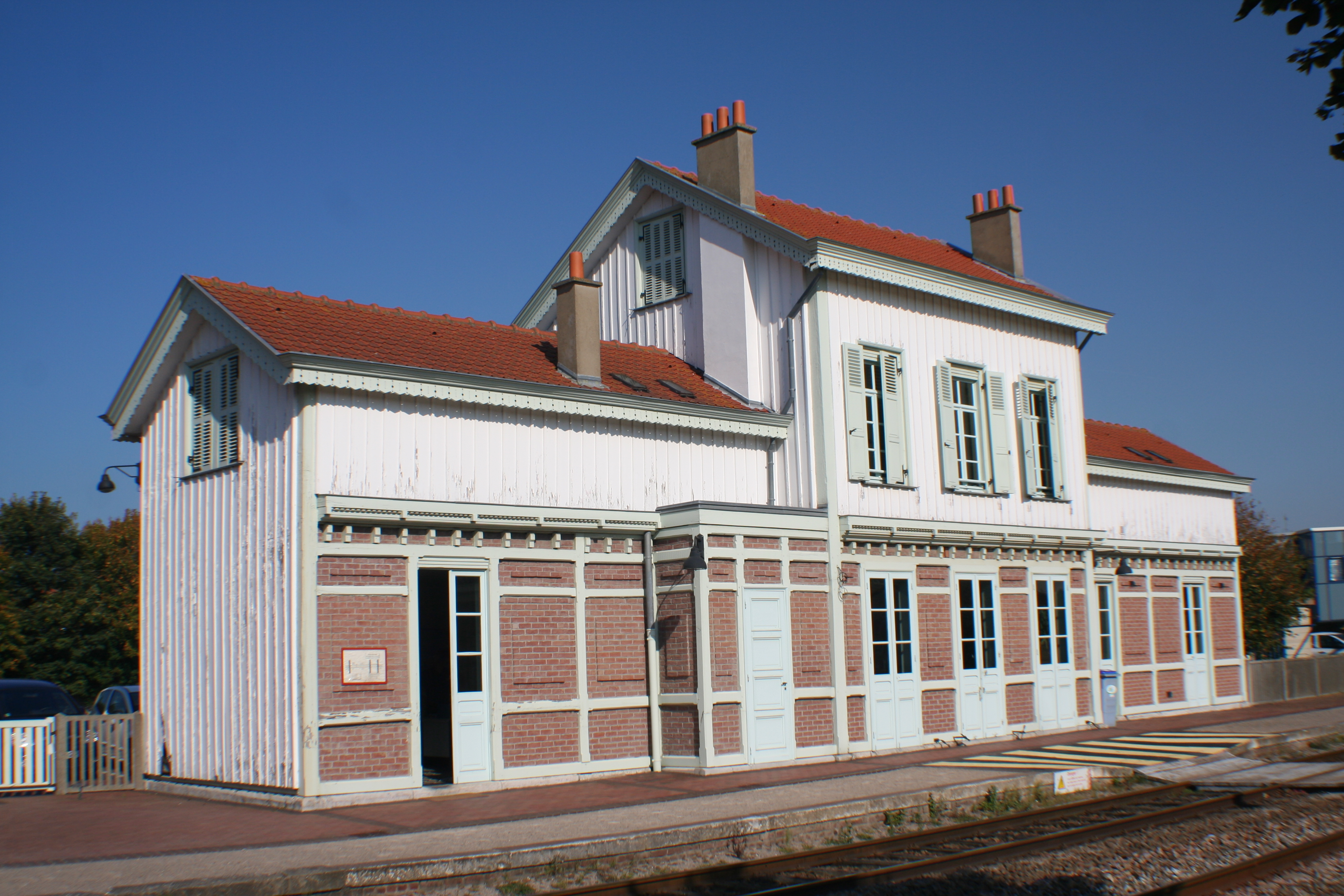
Gravelines station on the line from Dunkirk to Calais (TER Hauts-de-France).

== See also ==
- Communes of the Nord department
