= Saint-Georges-sur-l'Aa =

- Commune
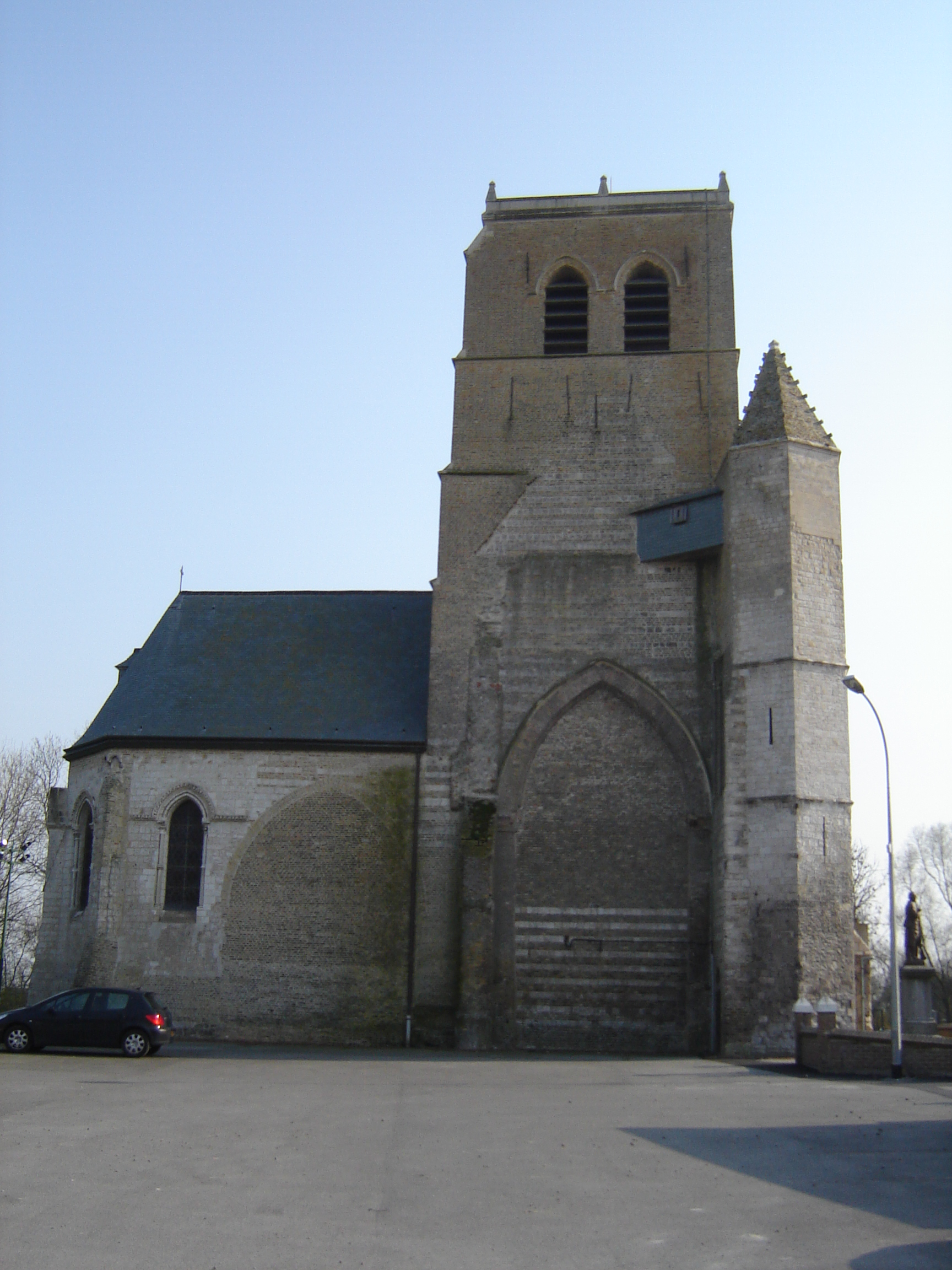
- Saint George's church

- Coat of arms
- Location of Saint-Georges-sur-l'Aa
- Location within France Location within Hauts-de-France
- Coordinates: 50°58′08″N 2°09′54″E
- Country: France
- Region: Hauts-de-France
- Department: Nord
- Arrondissement: Dunkerque
- Canton: Grande-Synthe
- Intercommunality: CU Dunkerque

Government
  - Mayor (2022–2026): Eric Bocquillon
- Area^{1}: 8.13 km^{2} (3.14 sq mi)
- Elevation: 2 m (6.6 ft)
- Population (2023): 287
  - Density: 35.3/km^{2} (91.4/sq mi)
- Time zone: UTC+01:00 (CET)
  - Summer (DST): UTC+02:00 (CEST)
- INSEE/Postal code: 59532 /59820
- ^{1} French Land Register data, which excludes lakes, ponds, glaciers > 1 km^{2} (0.386 sq mi or 247 acres) and river estuaries.

Saint-Georges-sur-l'Aa (French pronunciation: [sɛ̃ ʒɔʁʒ syʁ la], lit. 'Saint Georges on the Aa'; Dutch: Sint-Joris-aan-de-Aa) is a commune in the Nord department in northern France.

== See also ==
- Communes of the Nord department
