= Téteghem-Coudekerque-Village =

- Commune
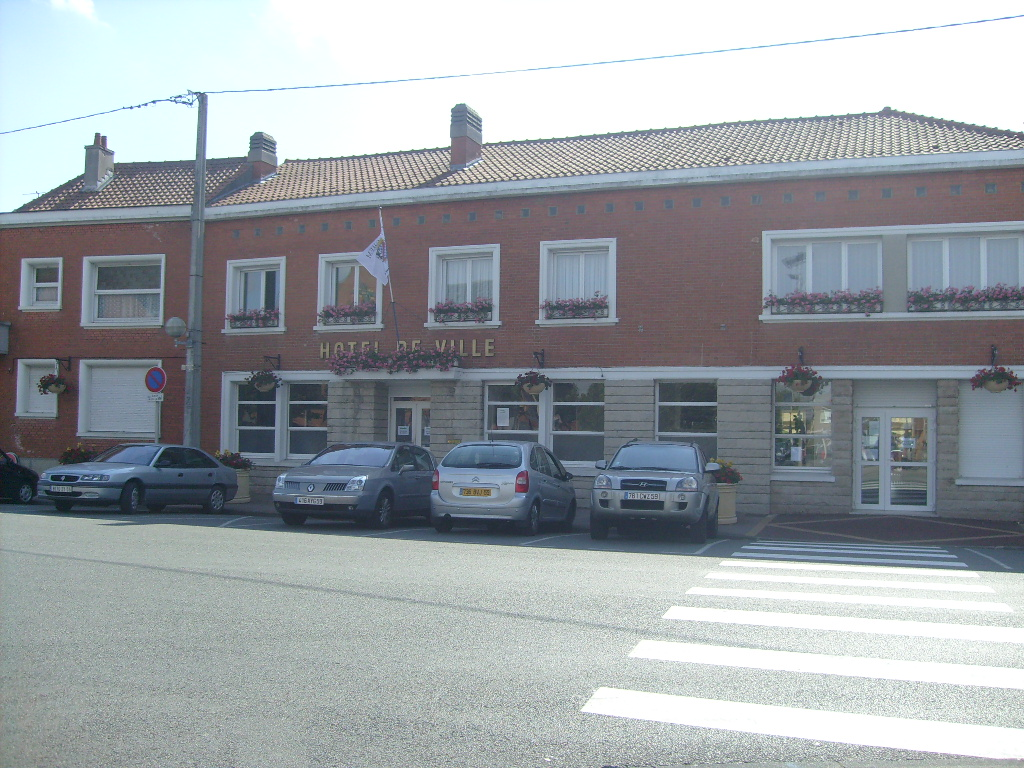
- The town hall in Téteghem
- Location of Téteghem-Coudekerque-Village
- Location within France Location within Hauts-de-France
- Coordinates: 51°01′01″N 2°26′28″E
- Country: France
- Region: Hauts-de-France
- Department: Nord
- Arrondissement: Dunkerque
- Canton: Coudekerque-Branche
- Intercommunality: CU de Dunkerque

Government
  - Mayor (2023–2026): Michel Pesch
- Area^{1}: 30.44 km^{2} (11.75 sq mi)
- Population (2023): 8,247
  - Density: 270.9/km^{2} (701.7/sq mi)
- Time zone: UTC+01:00 (CET)
  - Summer (DST): UTC+02:00 (CEST)
- INSEE/Postal code: 59588 /59229
- ^{1} French Land Register data, which excludes lakes, ponds, glaciers > 1 km^{2} (0.386 sq mi or 247 acres) and river estuaries.

Téteghem-Coudekerque-Village (French pronunciation: [tetɡɛm kudkɛʁk vilaʒ]; Dutch: Tetegem-Koudekerke-Dorp; West Flemish: Tetegem-Koukerke) is a commune in the Nord department of northern France. The municipality was established on 1 January 2016 and consists of the former communes of Téteghem and Coudekerque-Village.

== Population ==
The population data given in the table below refer to the commune in its geography as of January 2025.

Historical population
Year	Pop.	±% p.a.
1968	2,346	—
1975	3,494	+5.86%
1982	5,793	+7.49%
1990	6,742	+1.91%
1999	8,317	+2.36%
2007	8,398	+0.12%
2012	8,180	−0.52%
2017	8,341	+0.39%
2023	8,247	−0.19%
Source: INSEE

== See also ==
- Communes of the Nord department
