= Armbouts-Cappel =

Armbouts-Cappel Armboutskappel
- Commune
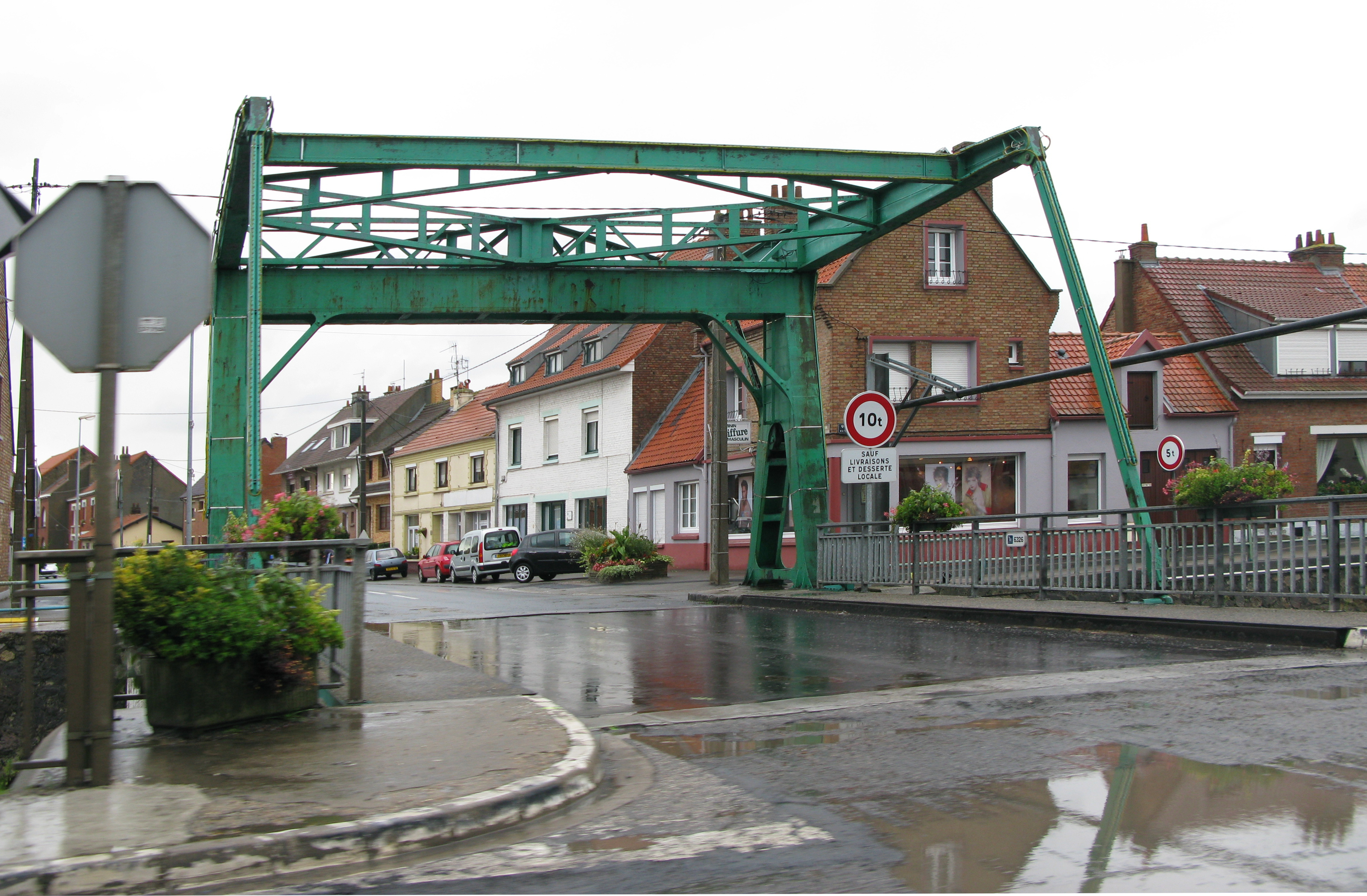
- The bridge in Grand-Millebrugghe

- Coat of arms
- Location of Armbouts-Cappel
- Location within France Location within Hauts-de-France
- Coordinates: 50°58′42″N 2°21′15″E
- Country: France
- Region: Hauts-de-France
- Department: Nord
- Arrondissement: Dunkerque
- Canton: Coudekerque-Branche
- Intercommunality: CU de Dunkerque

Government
  - Mayor (2020–2026): Jean-Luc Darcourt
- Area^{1}: 10.15 km^{2} (3.92 sq mi)
- Elevation: 2 m (6.6 ft)
- Highest elevation: 6 m (20 ft)
- Lowest elevation: 0 m (0 ft)
- Population (2023): 2,077
  - Density: 204.6/km^{2} (530.0/sq mi)
- Time zone: UTC+01:00 (CET)
  - Summer (DST): UTC+02:00 (CEST)
- INSEE/Postal code: 59016 /59380
- ^{1} French Land Register data, which excludes lakes, ponds, glaciers > 1 km^{2} (0.386 sq mi or 247 acres) and river estuaries.

Armbouts-Cappel (French pronunciation: [aʁmbuts kapɛl]; from Dutch: Armboutskappel) is a commune in the Nord department in northern France.

It is 7 kilometers south of the centre of Dunkirk.

== Population ==
Historical population

Year	Pop.	±% p.a.
1793	404	—
1821	540	+1.04%
1846	833	+1.75%
1872	1,052	+0.90%
1901	1,164	+0.35%
1926	1,153	−0.04%
1946	828	−1.64%
1962	1,049	+1.49%
1968	1,048	−0.02%

Year	Pop.	±% p.a.
1975	1,178	+1.68%
1982	2,562	+11.74%
1990	2,656	+0.45%
1999	2,677	+0.09%
2007	2,411	−1.30%
2012	2,437	+0.21%
2017	2,281	−1.31%
2023	2,077	−1.55%

Source: EHESS and INSEE (1968-2023)

== Heraldry ==
Arms of Armbouts-Cappel	The arms of Armbouts-Cappel are blazoned : Ermine, a chevron sable.

== See also ==
- Communes of the Nord department
