= André Delattre =

French politician

André Delattre (27 December 1931 – 4 February 2014) was a French politician who served as a member of the National Assembly from 1988 to 1993.

== Biography ==
After studying at Jean Bart College in Dunkirk, then Faidherbe High School and the Lille 2 University of Health and Law and finally at the École Normale in Douai, he became a teacher in 1951 and then, in 1970, headmaster of a school in his hometown.

In 1971, he became deputy mayor of Coudekerque-Branche under Maurice Mollet, a position he held until 1976, when he became mayor of Coudekerque-Branche. That same year, he became Communauté urbaine de Dunkerque, holding both positions until 2008.

In 1979, he defeated the mayor of Dunkirk, Claude Prouvoyeur, and became a general Departmental Council of Nord. In 1982, the canton of Coudekerque-Branche was created, and he became its general councilor, leaving the canton of Dunkirk-East to Claude Prouvoyeur. When the cantonal elections were held again in 1985, to everyone's surprise, he was defeated by Emmanuel Dewees (RPR).

Following Michel Delebarre's appointment as Minister of Transport and Maritime Affairs, he became representative for the Nord's 13th constituency region on July 29, 1988.

He died on February 4, 2014. He is buried in the cemetery of Coudekerque-Branche.
