= Grand-Fort-Philippe =

- Commune
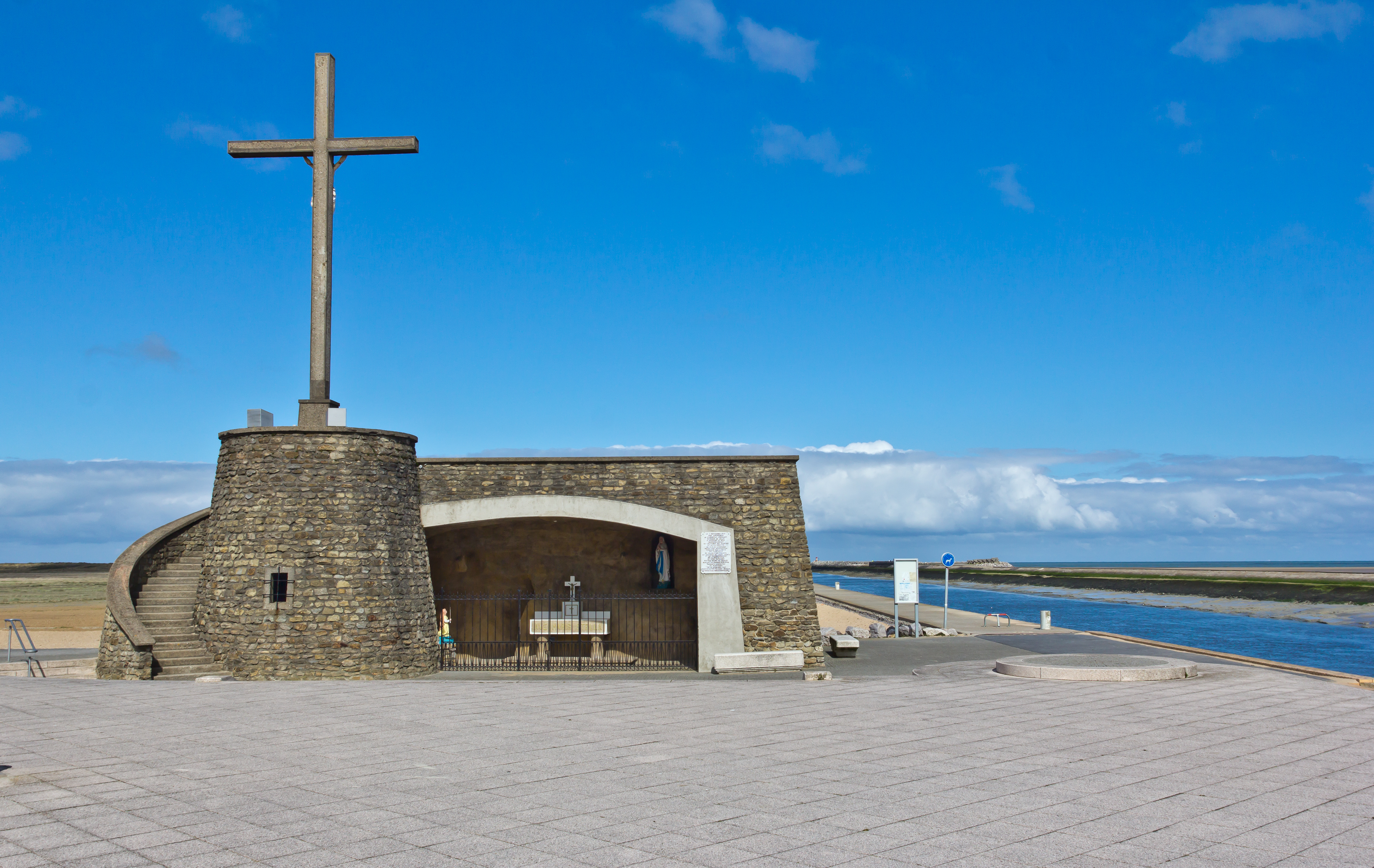
- The calvary in Grand-Fort-Philippe

- Coat of arms
- Location of Grand-Fort-Philippe
- Location within France Location within Hauts-de-France
- Coordinates: 51°00′05″N 2°06′19″E
- Country: France
- Region: Hauts-de-France
- Department: Nord
- Arrondissement: Dunkirk
- Canton: Grande-Synthe
- Intercommunality: CU Dunkerque

Government
  - Mayor (2020–2026): Sony Clinquart
- Area^{1}: 3.13 km^{2} (1.21 sq mi)
- Elevation: 5 m (16 ft)
- Highest elevation: 10 m (33 ft)
- Lowest elevation: 3 m (9.8 ft)
- Population (2023): 4,887
  - Density: 1,560/km^{2} (4,040/sq mi)
- Time zone: UTC+01:00 (CET)
  - Summer (DST): UTC+02:00 (CEST)
- INSEE/Postal code: 59272 /59153
- ^{1} French Land Register data, which excludes lakes, ponds, glaciers > 1 km^{2} (0.386 sq mi or 247 acres) and river estuaries.

Grand-Fort-Philippe (French pronunciation: [ɡʁɑ̃ fɔʁ filip]; Dutch: Groot-Fort-Filips) is a commune in the Nord department in northern France.

== History ==
The commune of Grand-Fort-Philippe was created in 1884, but the town had existed for a long time before that.

== Heraldry ==
Arms of Grand-Fort-Philippe	The arms of Grand-Fort-Philippe is blazoned : Or, a lion sable, within a bordure Gules. The shield over an anchor sable

== Demography ==
At the creation of the commune, in 1884, the population was of 2,641 inhabitants.

Historical population
Year	Pop.	±% p.a.
1968	5,394	—
1975	5,880	+1.24%
1982	6,611	+1.69%
1990	6,477	−0.26%
1999	6,078	−0.70%
2007	5,606	−1.01%
2012	5,320	−1.04%
2017	5,048	−1.04%
2023	4,887	−0.54%
Source: INSEE

== See also ==
- Communes of the Nord department
