= Craywick =

- Commune
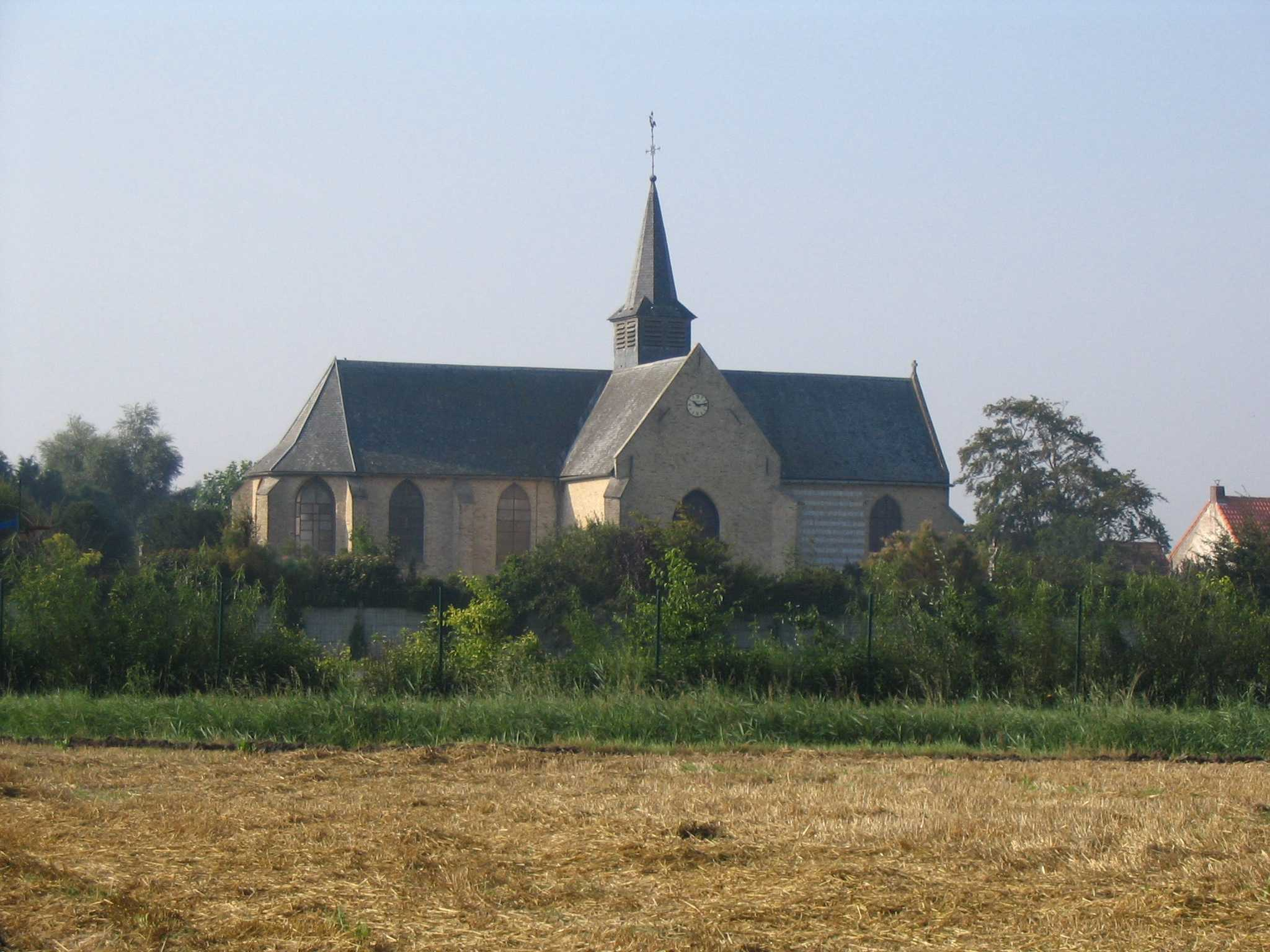
- The church in Craywick

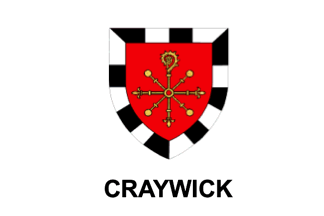
- Flag Coat of arms
- Location of Craywick
- Location within France Location within Hauts-de-France
- Coordinates: 50°58′16″N 2°14′13″E
- Country: France
- Region: Hauts-de-France
- Department: Nord
- Arrondissement: Dunkerque
- Canton: Grande-Synthe
- Intercommunality: CU de Dunkerque

Government
  - Mayor (2020–2026): Pierre Desmadrille
- Area^{1}: 7.73 km^{2} (2.98 sq mi)
- Elevation: 2 m (6.6 ft)
- Highest elevation: 8 m (26 ft)
- Lowest elevation: 0 m (0 ft)
- Population (2023): 791
  - Density: 102/km^{2} (265/sq mi)
- Time zone: UTC+01:00 (CET)
  - Summer (DST): UTC+02:00 (CEST)
- INSEE/Postal code: 59159 /59279
- ^{1} French Land Register data, which excludes lakes, ponds, glaciers > 1 km^{2} (0.386 sq mi or 247 acres) and river estuaries.

Craywick (French pronunciation: [kʁɛwik]; French Flemish: Craeywyck and Dutch: Kraaiwijk) is a commune in the Nord department in northern France.

== Heraldry ==
Arms of Craywick	The arms of Craywick are blazoned : Gules, an escarbuncle pommy and fleury Or, the middle branch ending in a crozier Or, all within a bordure compony argent and sable. (Craywick and Saint-Momelin use the same arms.)

One of the very few places in France with an English name.

== Gallery ==
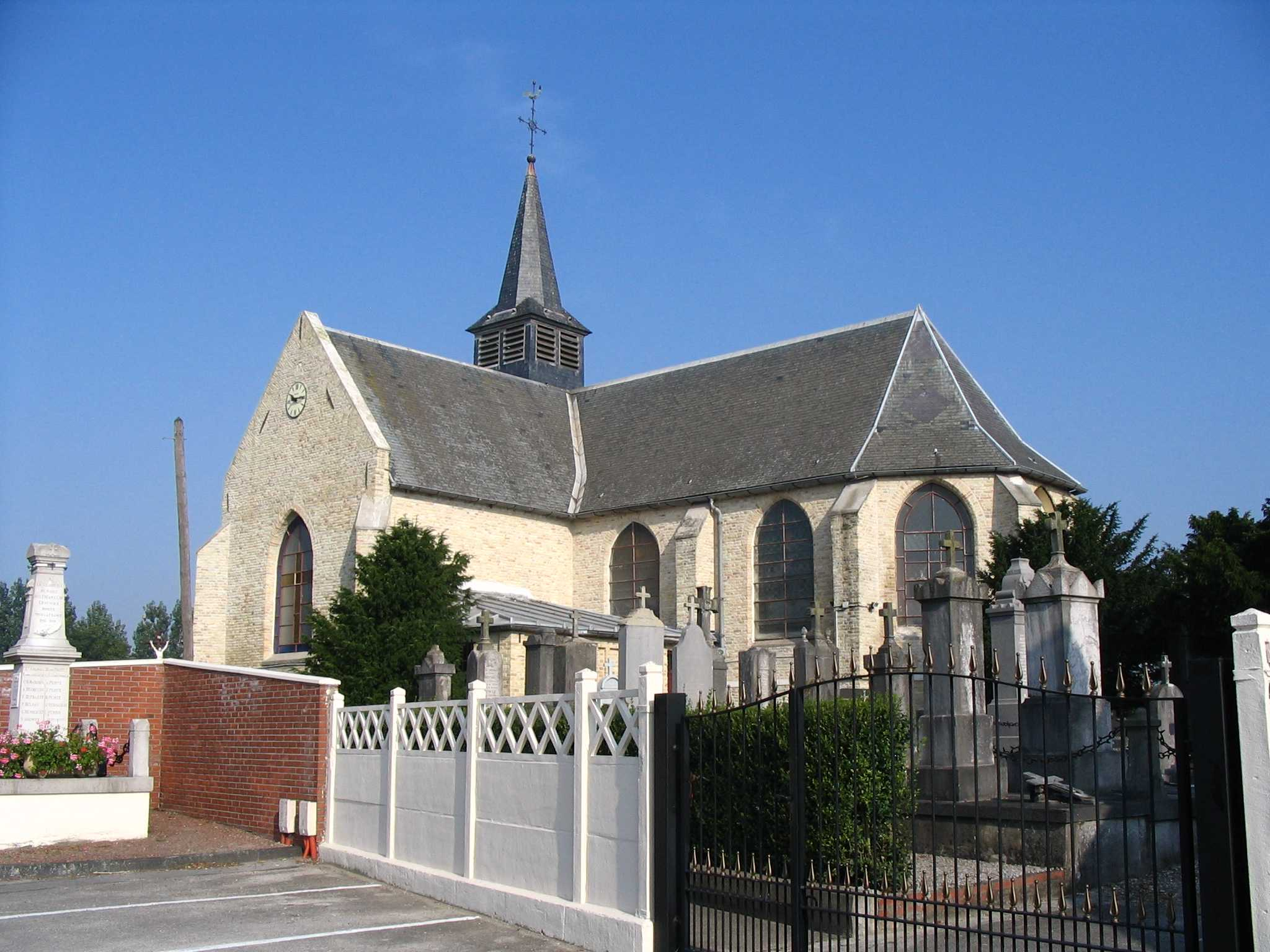
Craywick church

== See also ==
- Communes of the Nord department
