= Téteghem =

Commune in Nord, France

- Part of Téteghem-Coudekerque-Village
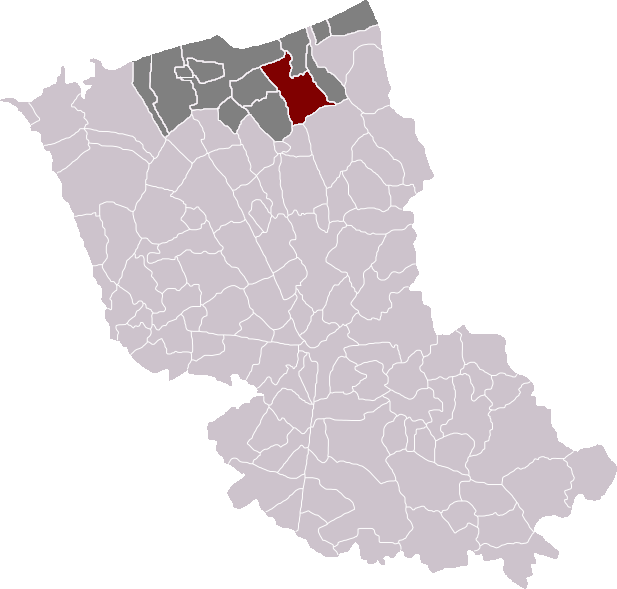
- Téteghem in the arrondissement of Dunkirk
- Location of Téteghem
- Location within France Location within Hauts-de-France
- Coordinates: 51°01′08″N 2°26′38″E
- Country: France
- Region: Hauts-de-France
- Department: Nord
- Arrondissement: Dunkerque
- Canton: Coudekerque-Branche
- Commune: Téteghem-Coudekerque-Village
- Area^{1}: 18.41 km^{2} (7.11 sq mi)
- Elevation: 2 m (6.6 ft)
- Highest elevation: 10 m (33 ft)
- Lowest elevation: 0 m (0 ft)
- Population (2022): 6,894
  - Density: 374.5/km^{2} (969.9/sq mi)
- Demonym: Téteghemois
- Time zone: UTC+01:00 (CET)
  - Summer (DST): UTC+02:00 (CEST)
- Postal code: 59229
- ^{1} French Land Register data, which excludes lakes, ponds, glaciers > 1 km^{2} (0.386 sq mi or 247 acres) and river estuaries.

Téteghem (French pronunciation: [tetɡɛm]; Dutch and West Flemish: Tetegem) is a former commune in the Nord department, northern France. On 1 January 2016, it was merged into the new commune Téteghem-Coudekerque-Village.

In the Second World War, Téteghem formed part of the perimeter defences during the Battle of Dunkirk in 1940.

== Heraldry ==
Arms of Téteghem	The arms of Téteghem are blazoned : Checky argent and azure, a bend gules.

== See also ==
- Communes of the Nord department
