= Saint-Momelin =

- Commune
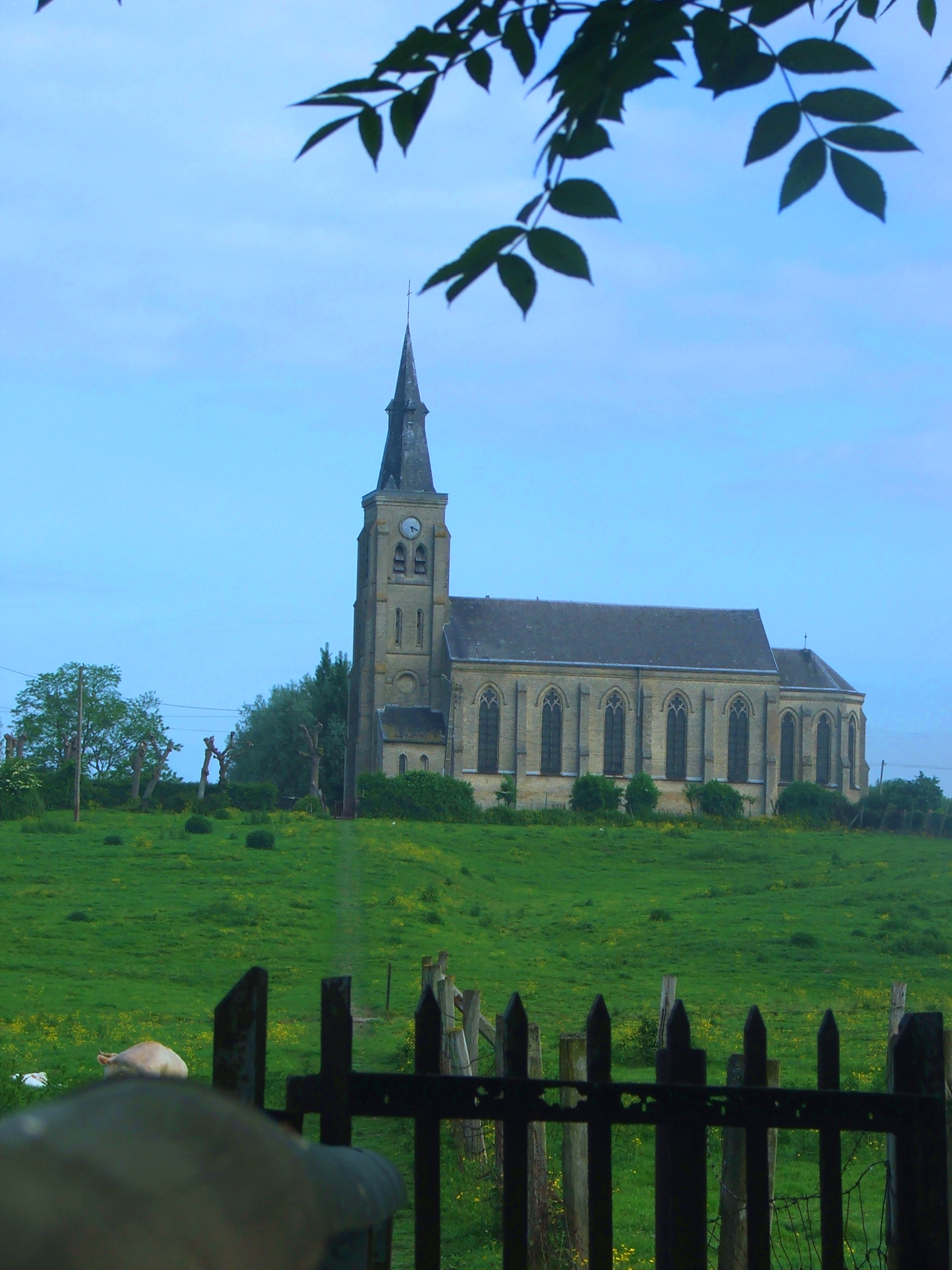
- The church in Saint-Momelin

- Coat of arms
- Location of Saint-Momelin
- Location within France Location within Hauts-de-France
- Coordinates: 50°47′39″N 2°15′06″E
- Country: France
- Region: Hauts-de-France
- Department: Nord
- Arrondissement: Dunkerque
- Canton: Wormhout
- Intercommunality: CC Hauts de Flandre

Government
  - Mayor (2020–2026): Marie-Noëlle Macrel
- Area^{1}: 6 km^{2} (2.3 sq mi)
- Elevation: 20 m (66 ft)
- Highest elevation: 71 m (233 ft)
- Lowest elevation: 0 m (0 ft)
- Population (2023): 410
  - Density: 68/km^{2} (180/sq mi)
- Time zone: UTC+01:00 (CET)
  - Summer (DST): UTC+02:00 (CEST)
- INSEE/Postal code: 59538 /59143
- ^{1} French Land Register data, which excludes lakes, ponds, glaciers > 1 km^{2} (0.386 sq mi or 247 acres) and river estuaries.

Saint-Momelin (French pronunciation: [sɛ̃ mɔmlɛ̃]; West Flemish: Sint-Momelingn; Dutch: Sint-Momelijn) is a commune in the Nord department in northern France.

== Heraldry ==
Arms of Saint-Momelin	The arms of Saint-Momelin are blazoned : Gules, an escarbuncle pommy and fleury Or, the middle branch ending in a crozier Or, all within a bordure compony argent and sable. (Craywick and Saint-Momelin use the same arms.)

== See also ==
- Communes of the Nord department
