= Spycker =

- Commune
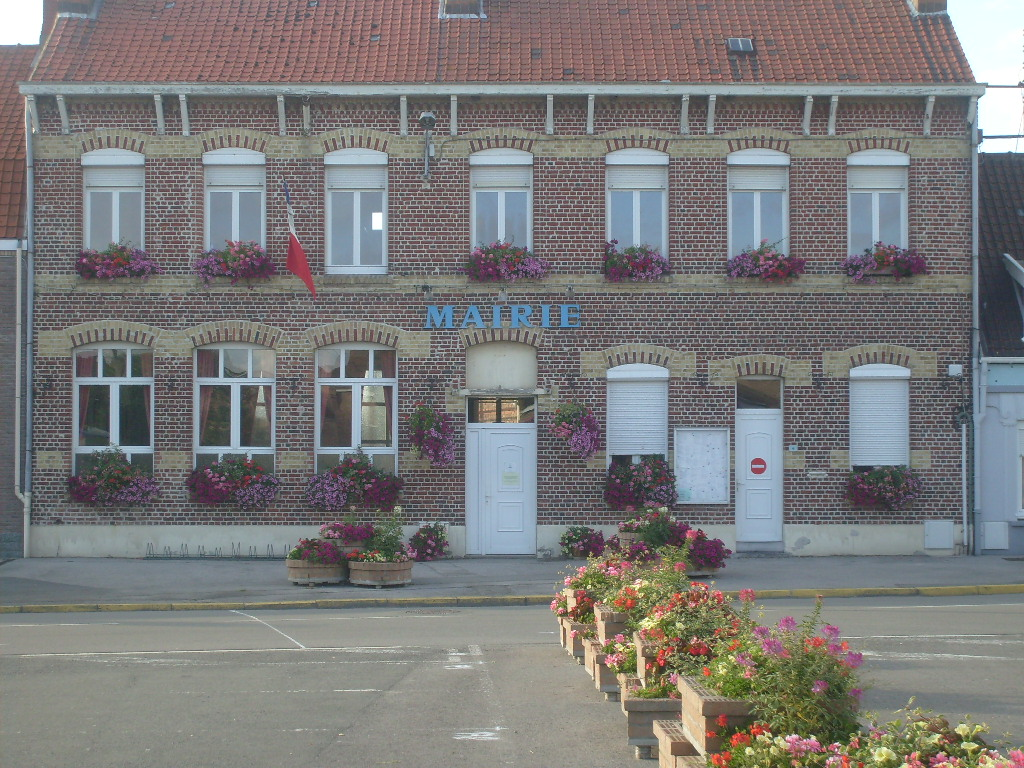
- Town hall in Spycker

- Coat of arms
- Location of Spycker
- Location within France Location within Hauts-de-France
- Coordinates: 50°58′12″N 2°19′27″E
- Country: France
- Region: Hauts-de-France
- Department: Nord
- Arrondissement: Dunkerque
- Canton: Coudekerque-Branche
- Intercommunality: CU Dunkerque

Government
  - Mayor (2020–2026): Jean-Luc Goetbloet
- Area^{1}: 9.19 km^{2} (3.55 sq mi)
- Elevation: 10 m (33 ft)
- Highest elevation: 5 m (16 ft)
- Lowest elevation: 0 m (0 ft)
- Population (2023): 1,718
  - Density: 187/km^{2} (484/sq mi)
- Time zone: UTC+01:00 (CET)
  - Summer (DST): UTC+02:00 (CEST)
- INSEE/Postal code: 59576 /59380
- ^{1} French Land Register data, which excludes lakes, ponds, glaciers > 1 km^{2} (0.386 sq mi or 247 acres) and river estuaries.

Spycker (French: [spikɛʁ]; Dutch: Spijker [ˈspɛikər]; West Flemish: Spyker) is a commune in the Nord department in northern France.

== History ==
Spycker was liberated by soldiers of The Black Watch (Royal Highland Regiment) of Canada in September 1944.

== Heraldry ==
Arms of Spycker	The arms of Spycker are blazoned : Argent billetty, a lion sable armed and langued gules. (Loon-Plage and Spycker use the same arms.)

== See also ==
- Communes of the Nord department
