= Coudekerque-Branche =

- Commune
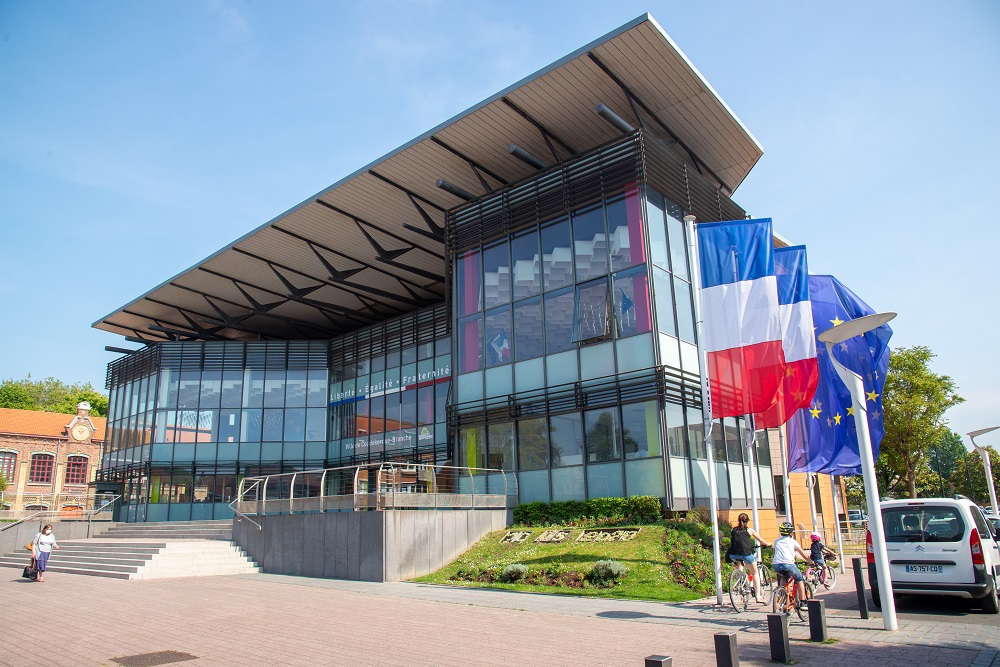
- The Hôtel de Ville

- Coat of arms
- Location of Coudekerque-Branche
- Location within France Location within Hauts-de-France
- Coordinates: 51°01′31″N 2°23′30″E
- Country: France
- Region: Hauts-de-France
- Department: Nord
- Arrondissement: Dunkirk
- Canton: Coudekerque-Branche
- Intercommunality: CU de Dunkerque

Government
  - Mayor (2020–2026): David Bailleul
- Area^{1}: 9.14 km^{2} (3.53 sq mi)
- Elevation: 3 m (9.8 ft)
- Highest elevation: 6 m (20 ft)
- Lowest elevation: 0 m (0 ft)
- Population (2023): 20,787
  - Density: 2,270/km^{2} (5,890/sq mi)
- Demonym: Coudekerquois (es)
- Time zone: UTC+01:00 (CET)
  - Summer (DST): UTC+02:00 (CEST)
- INSEE/Postal code: 59155 /59210
- ^{1} French Land Register data, which excludes lakes, ponds, glaciers > 1 km^{2} (0.386 sq mi or 247 acres) and river estuaries.

Coudekerque-Branche (French: [kudkɛʁk bʁɑ̃ʃ]; Dutch: Nieuw-Koudekerke [niu ˈkʌudəˌkɛrkə]; West Flemish: Nieuw-Koukerke; French Flemish: Nieuwe-Koudekerke; lit. 'New Cold Church') is a commune and town in the French department of Nord, Hauts-de-France, northern France.

It is the largest suburb of Dunkirk, and is adjacent to it on the southeast. As of 2023, the population of the commune was 20,787. The commune has a land area of 9.14 km^{2} (3.53 sq mi).

== History ==
The Hôtel de Ville was completed in 1980.

== Population ==
Historical population

Year	Pop.	±% p.a.
1793	1,939	—
1800	1,265	−5.92%
1806	1,295	+0.39%
1821	1,343	+0.24%
1831	1,402	+0.43%
1836	1,533	+1.80%
1841	1,703	+2.13%
1846	1,905	+2.27%
1851	1,448	−5.34%
1856	1,621	+2.28%
1861	976	−9.65%
1866	1,465	+8.46%
1872	1,803	+3.52%
1876	1,947	+1.94%
1881	2,420	+4.45%
1886	2,904	+3.71%
1891	3,537	+4.02%
1896	4,365	+4.30%
1901	5,440	+4.50%

Year	Pop.	±% p.a.
1906	6,271	+2.88%
1911	8,231	+5.59%
1921	9,264	+1.19%
1926	10,094	+1.73%
1931	11,867	+3.29%
1936	13,608	+2.78%
1946	12,506	−0.84%
1954	15,334	+2.58%
1962	20,757	+3.86%
1968	23,039	+1.75%
1975	24,930	+1.13%
1982	23,958	−0.57%
1990	23,644	−0.16%
1999	24,152	+0.24%
2007	22,986	−0.62%
2012	22,077	−0.80%
2017	21,134	−0.87%
2023	20,787	−0.28%

Source: EHESS and INSEE (1968-2023)

== Politics ==
=== Presidential Elections 2nd Round ===
Election	Candidate	Party	%
2017	Marine Le Pen	FN	52.74
2012	François Hollande	PS	57.74
2007	Ségolène Royal	PS	53.07
2002	Jacques Chirac	RPR	74.71

== Heraldry ==
Arms of Coudekerque-Branche	The arms of Coudekerque-Branche are blazoned : Sable, a hedgehog argent crowned Or.

== Notable people ==
- Nicolas Bruneel (born 1997), footballer
- André Delattre (1931–2014), politician
- Estelle Duvin (born 1997), Olympic ice hockey player
- Bruno Metsu (1954–2013), footballer and association football manager

== See also ==
- Communes of the Nord department
