= Cappelle-la-Grande =

Cappelle-la-Grande Kapelle
- Commune
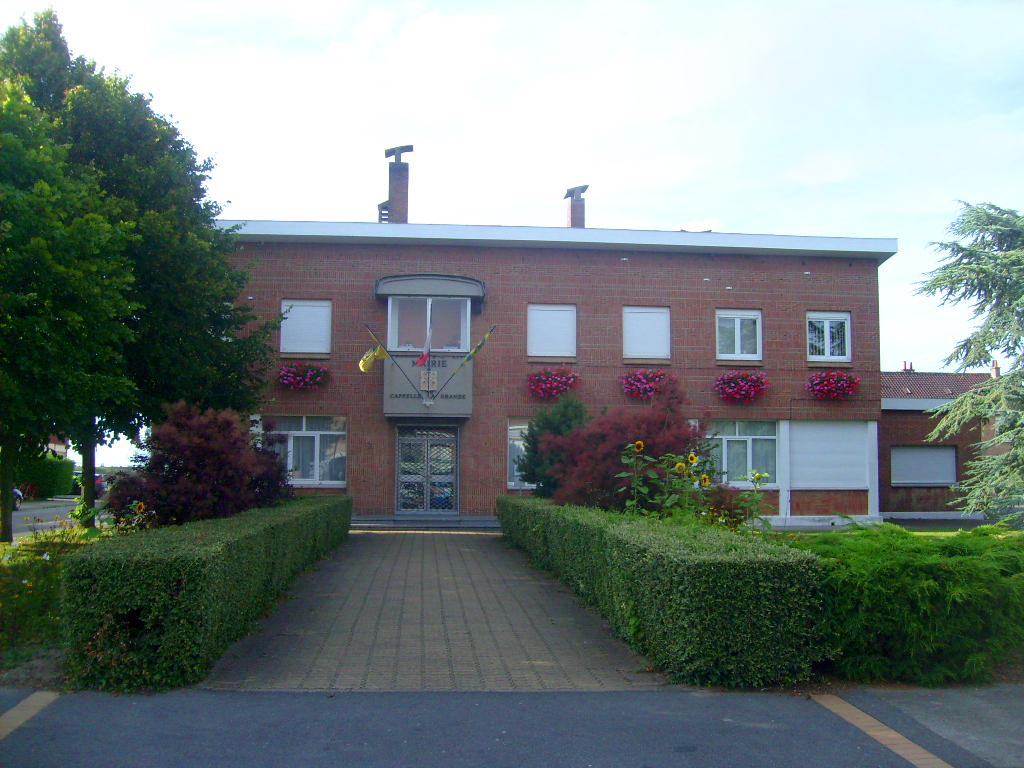
- The town hall of Cappelle-la-Grande in 2009

- Coat of arms
- Location of Cappelle-la-Grande
- Location within France Location within Hauts-de-France
- Coordinates: 50°59′56″N 2°21′50″E
- Country: France
- Region: Hauts-de-France
- Department: Nord
- Arrondissement: Dunkirk
- Canton: Coudekerque-Branche
- Intercommunality: CU de Dunkerque

Government
  - Mayor (2024–2026): Sophie Agneray
- Area^{1}: 5.46 km^{2} (2.11 sq mi)
- Elevation: 2 m (6.6 ft)
- Highest elevation: 5 m (16 ft)
- Lowest elevation: 1 m (3.3 ft)
- Population (2023): 7,839
  - Density: 1,440/km^{2} (3,720/sq mi)
- Demonym: Cappellois
- Time zone: UTC+01:00 (CET)
  - Summer (DST): UTC+02:00 (CEST)
- INSEE/Postal code: 59131 /59180
- Website: www.cappellelagrande.fr
- ^{1} French Land Register data, which excludes lakes, ponds, glaciers > 1 km^{2} (0.386 sq mi or 247 acres) and river estuaries.

Cappelle-la-Grande (French pronunciation: [kapɛl la ɡʁɑ̃d]; lit. 'Cappelle-the-Great'; Dutch: Kapelle) is a commune in the Nord department in northern France. It is on the border with Dunkirk.

== Population ==
Historical population
Year	Pop.	±% p.a.
1968	5,723	—
1975	7,962	+4.83%
1982	9,186	+2.06%
1990	8,908	−0.38%
1999	8,613	−0.37%
2007	8,134	−0.71%
2012	8,022	−0.28%
2017	7,899	−0.31%
2023	7,839	−0.13%
Source: INSEE

== Heraldry ==
Arms of Cappelle-la-Grande	The arms of Cappelle-la-Grande are blazoned : Argent semy of cross-crosslets fitchy, 2 fesses sable, and in chief an inescutcheon Or a chevron sable.

== See also ==
- Communes of the Nord department
- Cappelle-la-Grande Open
