= Communauté urbaine =

France intercommunal subdivision integrating a city and its suburbs

Communauté urbaine (French pronunciation: [kɔmynote yʁbɛn]; French for "urban community") is the second most integrated form of intercommunality in France, after the Metropolis (French: métropole). A communauté urbaine is composed of a city (commune) and its independent suburbs (independent communes).

The first communautés urbaines were created by the French Parliament on 31 December 1966. Originally there were only four, found in the metropolitan areas of Bordeaux, Lille, Lyon and Strasbourg. Later, others were created in other metropolitan areas. The purpose of the communautés urbaines was to achieve cooperation and joint administration between large cities and their independent suburbs. This step often followed failed attempts to merge the communes within a metropolitan area. The status of the communauté urbaine was modified by the Chevènement Law of 1999. Since the creation of the métropoles in 2011, several former communautés urbaines have become métropoles, for instance Nice, Strasbourg, Marseille, Nancy and Dijon.

Unlike the case in either a communauté d'agglomération or communauté de communes, communes cannot leave a communauté urbaine freely.

As of January 2025, there are 14 communautés urbaines in France (all in metropolitan France), with a combined population of 3.17 million inhabitants (as of 2022, in 2025 limits). All of the urban areas in France with more than half a million inhabitants are a communauté urbaine or a métropole. Some communautés urbaines are relatively small; smaller than many communautés d'agglomération.

The communautés urbaines are each administered by a council called a "conseil communautaire" (community council), composed of a proportional representation of members of municipal councils of member towns. The council is headed by an executive composed of a president and vice-presidents elected by the council. The president is in many cases the mayor of the main or most populous city. The mayors of the others cities are often also vice-presidents of the executive, the deputies-mayors are often members of the council, as are some members of the towns' councils.

== List of communautés urbaines ==
Name	Seat	Number of communes	Population (2022)
CU Alençon	Alençon	31	57,183
CU Angers Loire Métropole	Angers	29	315,893
CU Arras	Arras	46	111,820
CU Grand Besançon Métropole	Besançon	67	203,293
CU Caen la Mer	Caen	48	281,939
CU Creusot Montceau	Le Creusot	34	92,045
CU Dunkerque	Dunkirk	17	195,297
CU Grand Paris Seine et Oise	Aubergenville	73	437,433
CU Le Havre Seine Métropole	Le Havre	54	270,407
CU Limoges Métropole	Limoges	20	210,327
CU Le Mans Métropole	Le Mans	20	213,722
CU Perpignan Méditerranée Métropole	Perpignan	37	281,973
CU Grand Poitiers	Poitiers	40	201,413
CU Grand Reims	Reims	143	302,446
