= Battle of Gravelines =

The Battle of Gravelines is the name given to two battles:

- The Battle of Gravelines (1558), in which Spain defeated France in 1558.
- The Battle of Gravelines (1588), in which an English fleet defeated a Spanish fleet during the attempted Spanish invasion of England in 1588.
