= Canton of Coudekerque-Branche =

Canton of Nord department, France

Coordinates: 51.02°N 2.39°E

The canton of Coudekerque-Branche is an administrative division of the Nord department, northern France. Its borders were modified at the French canton reorganisation which came into effect in March 2015. Its seat is in Coudekerque-Branche.

It consists of the following communes:

1. Armbouts-Cappel
2. Bergues
3. Bierne
4. Cappelle-la-Grande
5. Coudekerque-Branche
6. Spycker
7. Steene
8. Téteghem-Coudekerque-Village
9. Uxem
