= Communauté urbaine de Dunkerque =

Coordinates: 51.03°N 2.38°E

Dunkerque
- Communauté urbaine
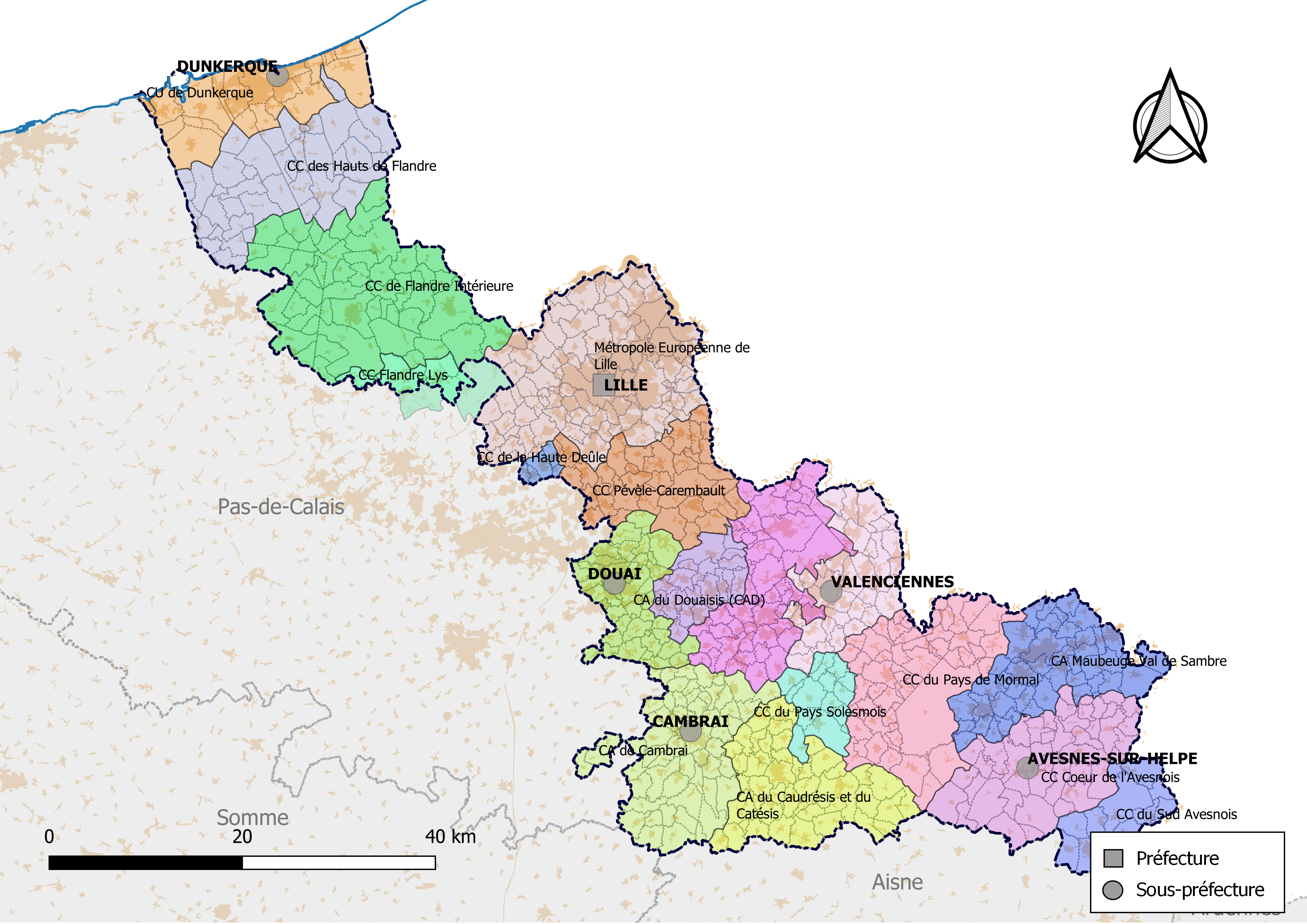
- Location within the Nord department (orange)
- Country: France
- Region: Hauts-de-France
- Department: Nord
- No. of communes: {{{nbcomm}}}
- Established: 1968
- Area: 299.89 km^{2} (115.79 sq mi)
- Population (2018): 195,917
  - Density: 653.30/km^{2} (1,692.0/sq mi)
- Website: www.communaute-urbaine-dunkerque.fr

The Communauté urbaine de Dunkerque (English: Dunkirk Urban Community) is the communauté urbaine, an intercommunal structure, centred on the city of Dunkirk. It is located in the Nord department, in the Hauts-de-France region, northern France. It was created in October 1968. Its area is 299.9 km^{2}. Its population was 195,917 in 2018, of which 86,865 in Dunkirk proper.

== Composition ==
The communauté urbaine consists of the following 17 communes:

1. Armbouts-Cappel
2. Bourbourg
3. Bray-Dunes
4. Cappelle-la-Grande
5. Coudekerque-Branche
6. Craywick
7. Dunkirk
8. Ghyvelde
9. Grande-Synthe
10. Grand-Fort-Philippe
11. Gravelines
12. Leffrinckoucke
13. Loon-Plage
14. Saint-Georges-sur-l'Aa
15. Spycker
16. Téteghem-Coudekerque-Village
17. Zuydcoote
