= List of maritime patrol aircraft =

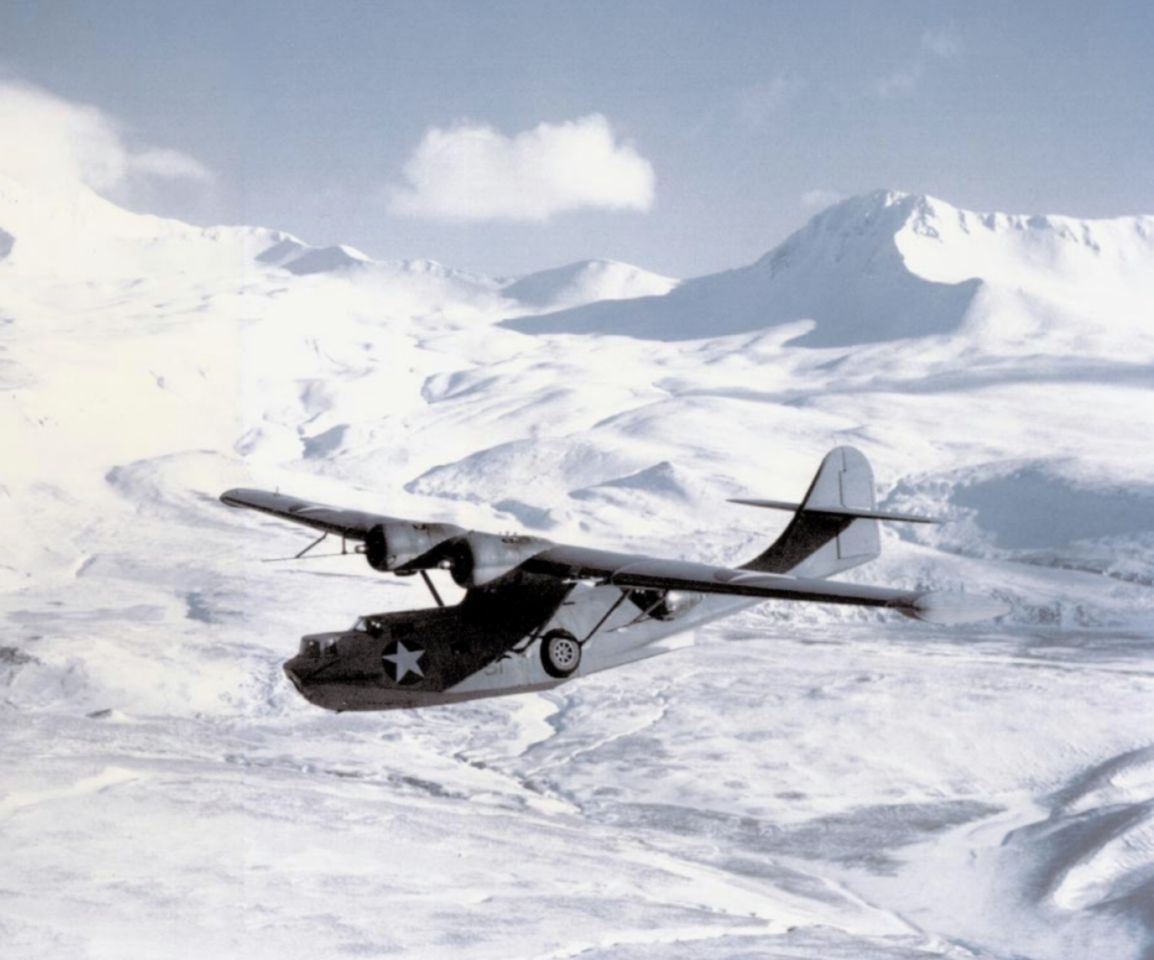
Consolidated PBY Catalina maritime patrol aircraft on patrol

The following is a list of maritime patrol aircraft, which are sometimes referred to as Maritime reconnaissance, coastal reconnaissance or patrol bombers depending on the service and the time period, and are characterized by their use in controlling sea lanes.

== Maritime patrol aircraft ==
Type	Origin	Date	Status	N°	Notes
AD Flying Boat	UK	1916		27	
Aichi H9A	Japan	1940	retired	31	
Airbus A319 MPA	France	1995	In service	0	(Note: Proposal only, flight date is of airframe only)
Armstrong Whitworth Whitley	UK	1936	retired	1,814	
ATR 42 MP Surveyor	Italy	1984	In service		
ATR 72 MP	Italy	1988	In service		
ATR 72 ASW	France	1988	In service		
Avro Anson	UK	1935	retired	6,688	(Note: Production total of Mk.Is- includes trainers and bombers)
Avro Lancaster GR.III/MR.III/10MR/MP	UK & Canada	1941	retired	1 (GR.III/MR.III); 70-75 (10MR/MP)	(Note: Built in both countries, heavily modified in Canada)
Avro Shackleton	UK	1949	retired	185	
B class blimp	USA	1917	retired	20	
BAE Systems Nimrod MRA4	UK	2004	cancelled 2010	9	
Beechcraft King Air	USA	1963	In service		
Basler BT-67	USA	1990	In service		
Beriev Be-6	USSR	1943	retired	123	
Beriev Be-10	USSR	1956	retired	28	
Beriev Be-12	USSR	1960	In service	143	
Beriev Be-42	Russia	1986	In service	2	
Beriev MBR-2	USSR	1931	retired		
Blackburn Iris	UK	1926	retired	5	
Blackburn Perth	UK	1933	retired	4	
Blohm & Voss BV 138	Germany	1937	retired	297	
Boeing XPBB Sea Ranger	United States	1942	retired	1	
Boeing 737 Surveiller	USA	1967	In service		
Boeing P-8 Poseidon	USA	2009	In service	155	
Bombardier DHC-8 MPA/MSA variants	Canada	2007	In service	26	
Breguet 521	France	1933		37	(Note: Developed from Short Calcutta)
Breguet Alizé	France	1956		89	
Breguet Atlantic	France	1965		115	
Britten-Norman Defender/Islander	UK	1970			
C class blimp	USA	1918	retired	10	
C-Star class blimp	UK	1918		10	
CAMS 55	France	1928		112	
Canadair CP-107 Argus	Canada	1957	retired	33	
Canadian Vickers Vancouver	Canada	1929	retired	6	
CANT Z.501	Italy	1934		200	
CANT Z.506	Italy	1935		320+	
Caproni Ca.314-SC	Italy	1940		14	
CASA C-212 MPA	Spain	1971		12	
CASA/IPTN CN-235 MPA/HC-144 Ocean Sentry	Spain & Indonesia	1983		24+	
Chyetverikov MDR-6	USSR	1937		27	
Coastal class blimp	UK	1916		35	
Consolidated P2Y	USA	1929	retired	78	
Consolidated PBY Catalina	USA	1935		3,305	(Note: 620 Catalinas built in Canada and 24 in USSR)
Consolidated PB2Y Coronado	USA	1937	retired	217	
Consolidated PB4Y-1 Liberator	USA	1939		976	
Consolidated PB4Y-2 Privateer	USA	1943	retired	739	
Convair P5Y	USA	1950		2	
Curtiss Model H	USA	1914		478	
Curtiss HS-1L & HS-2L	USA	1917		1,178~	
D class blimp	USA	1920		6	
Dassault Falcon 20G	France	1963		46	
Dassault Falcon 50M	France	1976			
Dassault Falcon 900 MSA	France	1984			
Diamond DA42 Guardian	Austria	2002			
Donnet-Denhaut flying boat	France	1915		1,085~	
Dornier Wal	Germany	1922		250+	
Dornier Do 24	Germany	1937		279	
Dornier 228	Germany	1981			
Douglas B-18 Bolo/Digby	USA	1935		370	
Douglas/BSAS Turbo Dakota	USA	1991		5	
Douglas PD-1	USA	1923		25	
CASA C-295 MPA	Spain	1997			
Embraer EMB 111 Bandeirante	Brazil	1968		16+	
Embraer R-99	Brazil	2001		16+	
P-99 (EMB-145MP)	Brazil	2003			
Fairey Gannet	UK	1949		303	
FBA Types A, B, C & S	France	1913		1,000~	
FBA Type H	France	1915		2,000~	
FBA Type S	France	1917			
Felixstowe F.2	UK	1916		175	
Felixstowe F.3	UK	1917		182	
Felixstowe F5L/Curtiss F5L	UK & US	1918		227	(Note: built in both countries, airframe by Curtiss, hull by Porte in the UK.))
Fiat RS.14	Italy	1939		188	
Focke-Wulf Fw 200	Germany	1937		276	
Fokker F27 200-MAR	Netherlands	1955			(Note: unarmed variant)
Fokker F27 Maritime Enforcer	Netherlands	1955			
Fokker T.IV	Netherlands	1927		33	
Fokker T.VIII	Netherlands	1938		36	
Friedrichshafen FF.60	Germany	1918		1	
Gotha WD.9	Germany	1914		1	
Gotha WD.27	Germany	1918		1	
Grumman AF Guardian	USA	1945		389	
Grumman Tracker	USA	1952		1,284	
Hall PH	USA	1929		24	
Harbin SH-5	China	1976		6	
Hawker-Siddeley Nimrod	UK	1967		51	
Hiro H4H	Japan	1931		47	
IAI 1124N Sea Scan	Israel	1977		4	
IAI ELI-3360	Israel	2015		NA	
IAI Heron	Israel	2005		NA	UAV
Ilyushin Il-38	USSR	1967		58	
Junkers Ju 290	Germany	1942		65	
K-class blimp	USA	1938		134	
Kawanishi H3K	Japan	1930		5	
Kawanishi H6K Mavis	Japan	1936		215	
Kawanishi H8K Emily	Japan	1941		131	
Kawasaki P-1	Japan	2007		10	
Kawasaki P-2J	Japan	1966		83	(Note: turboprop Lockheed P-2)
Keystone PK-1	USA	1930		18	
Kyushu Q1W	Japan	1943		153	
Leonardo / Bombardier Maritime MMA	Italy / Canada	2025	In development		Based on Global 6500
Lockheed Hudson	USA	1938		2,941	
Lockheed PV-1 Ventura	USA	1940		2,511	
Lockheed PV-2 Harpoon	USA	1943		535	
Lockheed P-2 Neptune	USA	1945		1,036	
Lockheed P-3 Orion	USA	1959		757	(Note: Lockheed CP-140 Aurora is the Canadian designation for same aircraft with the Canadian Forces)
Lockheed P-7	USA	2000	Cancelled project	0	
Boeing P-8 Poseidon	USA	2013			
Lockheed S-3 Viking	USA	1972		188	
Lohner L	Austria-Hungary	1915		100+	
Loire 70	France	1933		8	
M class blimp	USA	1944		4	
Macchi M.C.99	Italy	1937		1	
Mann Egerton Type B	UK	1916		10	
Marinens Flyvebaatfabrikk M.F.11	Norway	1931		29	
Martin PM-1	USA	1930		30	
Martin PM-2	USA	1931		27	
Martin P2M	USA	1929		1	
Martin P3M	USA	1931		19	
Martin P4M Mercator	USA	1946		46	(Note: Most diverted to other purposes)
Martin P5M Marlin	USA	1948		285	
Martin P6M SeaMaster	United States	1955		12	
Martin PBM Mariner	USA	1939		1,285	
Myasishchev 3M/3MD	USSR	1956		93	(Note: all variants)
Naval Aircraft Factory PN	USA	1922		15	
Nord 1402 Noroit	France	1949		25	
Norman Thompson N.T.4	UK	1916		26	
North Sea class blimp	UK	1917		14	
Northrop Grumman MQ-4C Triton	USA	2013		2	Drones
PZL M28B Bryza	Poland	1984		11	
Rogožarski SIM-XIV-H	Yugoslavia	1938		19	
Rohrbach Ro IV	Denmark & UK	1925		2	
Royal Aircraft Factory C.E.1	UK	1918		2	
Saab Swordfish MPA	Sweden	2016			
Saro Lerwick	UK	1938		21	
Saro London	UK	1934		31	
Savoia-Marchetti S.55	Italy	1924		243+	
Savoia-Marchetti S.59	Italy	1925		240+	
Savoia-Marchetti SM.62	Italy	1926		64	
Shaanxi Y-8F, Q & X	China	1984			
Shaanxi KQ-200	China	2015			
Shin Meiwa PS-1	Japan	1967		25	
ShinMaywa US-2	Japan	2003		9	
Short Type 184	UK	1915		936	
Short Empire	UK	1936		9	(Note: Two BOAC examples converted for the RAF with full weapons fit including fuselage depth charge racks and tail and top turrets; five Qantas Empire Airways/BOAC examples converted for the Royal Australian Air Force with makeshift weapons; and two stock TEAL examples used for visual patrols by the Royal New Zealand Air Force.)
Short Rangoon	UK	1930		6	
Short S.26/M	UK	1939		3	
Short Seaford	UK	1944		10	
Short Seavan	UK	1976			
Short Shetland	UK	1944		2	
Short Singapore III	UK	1934		37	
Short Sunderland	UK	1937		777	
Submarine Scout class blimp	UK	1915		60	
Submarine Scout Pusher class blimp	UK	1917		6	
Submarine Scout Twin class blimp	UK	1918		13	
Submarine Scout Zero class blimp	UK	1916		77	
Supermarine Scapa	UK	1932		15	
Supermarine Southampton	UK	1925		83	
Supermarine Stranraer	UK	1934		57	(Note: More built in Canada than UK)
Tupolev Tu-16T/PL/R/RM/SP	USSR	1952		1,509	(Note: Production figure includes all variants.)
Tupolev Tu-95MR	USSR	1961		4	
Tupolev Tu-142	USSR	1968		100	
Vickers Warwick GR Mk.II and V	UK	1939		328	
Vickers Wellington GR.Mk.VIII/XI/XII/XIII/XIV	UK	1936		2,230	
Yokosuka H5Y	Japan	1936		20	
Zeppelin-Lindau (Dornier) Rs.I	Germany	1915		1	
Zeppelin-Lindau (Dornier) Rs.II	Germany	1916		1	
Zeppelin-Lindau (Dornier) Rs.III	Germany	1917		1	
Zeppelin-Lindau (Dornier) Rs.IV	Germany	1918		1	
