= Hiro H3H1 =

H3H1
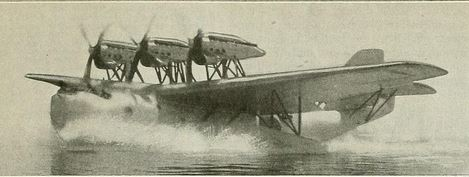
- The Type 90-1 Flying boat, with radiators in their early, forward position.

General information
- Type: Bomber flying boat
- National origin: Japan
- Manufacturer: Hiro Naval Arsenal
- Designer: Jun Okamura
- Number built: 1

History
- First flight: Spring 1932

The Hiro H3H1 or Navy Type 90-1 Flying boat was a Japanese flying boat bomber built in 1931. It was the first large all-metal aircraft built in Japan. Only one was completed.

== Design and development ==
The H3H1 was Hiro Naval Arsenal's first large all-metal, stressed-skin aircraft, though they had long experience of large, wooden, flying boat design and construction. It was the first Japanese Naval aircraft able to carry a one tonne bomb load. Built in 1931, it was first flown in the spring of 1932.

It had a shoulder-mounted, cantilever wing built around a type of single box spar previously proven by the German company Rohrbach. Its three licence-built, 480–590 kW (650–790 hp), Hispano-Suiza V12 engines were tractor mounted over the wing on multi-strut pylons. Lateral stability on the water was provided by floats at mid-span, mounted on vertical N-struts and braced by inward parallel strut pairs to the wing.

The hull incorporated both Hiro's experience and some features from that of the Supermarine Southampton, with hydrodynamics refined in the water tank of the Naval Technical Research Institution. The H3H1 was flown from a side-by-side, open cockpit well ahead of the wings. There was an open mooring cockpit in the nose, also equipped with a pair of flexibly mounted 7.7 mm (0.30 in) machine guns, and other, similarly equipped, gun positions amidships and in the tail. The maximum bomb load was 1,000 kg (2,200 lb). Its tail surfaces were conventional with the tailplane mounted just above the base of the fin and braced to the fuselage on N-struts.

After its first flight, the H3H1 flew to Yokohama for extensive testing which revealed problems with aerodynamic stability and with the engine installations. The former led to the addition of auxiliary fins on the tailplane and modification of the tailplane struts to allow its incidence to be adjusted for trimming. The engines had their radiators moved further aft, and different propellers were tested. The modification state was denoted with a dash number suffix, thus the final modification state of the Navy Type 90-1 Flying boat was the Navy Type 90-1-4 Flying boat.

Despite the changes, the stability problems persisted and the contemporary, but more traditional, Kawanishi H3K biplane was preferred by the Navy. From 1933, the H3H1 was used as an engine test-bed for the Mitsubishi MK1 Shinten 950 hp (710 kW) 14 cylinder, double-row radial engine.

== Specifications ==
Data from Japanese Aircraft 1910-1941.

General characteristics

- Crew: nine
- Length: 22.71 m (74 ft 6 in)
- Wingspan: 31.05 m (101 ft 10 in)
- Height: 7.52 m (24 ft 8 in)
- Wing area: 137 m^{2} (1,470 sq ft)
- Empty weight: 7,900 kg (17,417 lb)
- Gross weight: 11,900 kg (26,235 lb)
- Powerplant: 3 × Mitsubishi Hispano-Suiza 12 V-12 water-cooled, 480–590 kW (650–790 hp) each
- Propellers: 4-bladed wooden

Performance

- Maximum speed: 228 km/h (142 mph, 123 kn)
- Cruise speed: 157 km/h (98 mph, 85 kn)
- Alighting speed: 112 km/h (70 mph; 60 kn)
- Range: 2,046 km (1,272 mi, 1,105 nmi)
- Endurance: 13hr
- Service ceiling: 4,500 m (14,800 ft)
- Time to altitude: 17 min to 3,000 m (9,800 ft)

Armament

- Guns: Pairs of flexibly-mounted 7.7 mm (0.30 in) machine guns in nose, tail and amidships on both sides
- Bombs: 2 × 500 kg (1,100 lb) or 4 × 250 kg (550 lb)

== See also ==
Related lists

- List of military aircraft of Japan
- List of seaplanes and flying boats
