= Hiro Naval Arsenal =

WWII Japanese armament factory

The Hiro Naval Arsenal (Hiro Kaigun Kōshō or Dai-Jūichi Kaigun Kōkū-shō (11th Naval Arsenal), often abbreviated as Hiroshō) at Kure (呉), Hiroshima prefecture, was a production facility for seaplanes, flying boats, and aero engines for the Imperial Japanese Navy before and during World War II. It was largely destroyed in a raid by B-29 Superfortresses on 5 May 1945.

== Aircraft ==
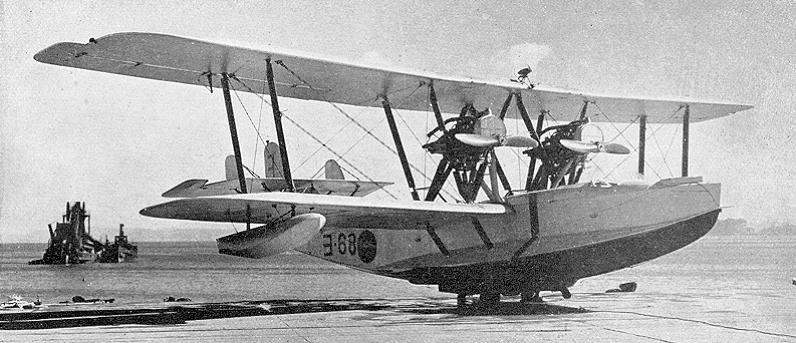
Hiro H1H Biplane Flying Boat

Designed and produced:

- Hiro G2H - long-range bomber
- Hiro H1H - biplane flying boat developed from the Felixstowe F.5
- Hiro H2H - biplane flying boat developed from the Supermarine Southampton II
- Hiro H4H - flying boat

Prototypes and experimental aircraft:

- Hiro R-3 - flying boat, 1 example built
- Hiro H3H1 - flying boat, 1 example built
- Hiro H10H - project only, never completed

Aircraft designed by other manufacturers produced at Hiro:

- Yokosuka B3Y
- Nakajima B5N "Kate"
- Aichi E13A "Jake"
- Yokosuka D4Y "Judy"

== Engines ==
- Hiro Type 14
- Hiro Type 61
- Hiro Type 91
- Hiro Type 94
