= Hiro Type 14 =

Type 14
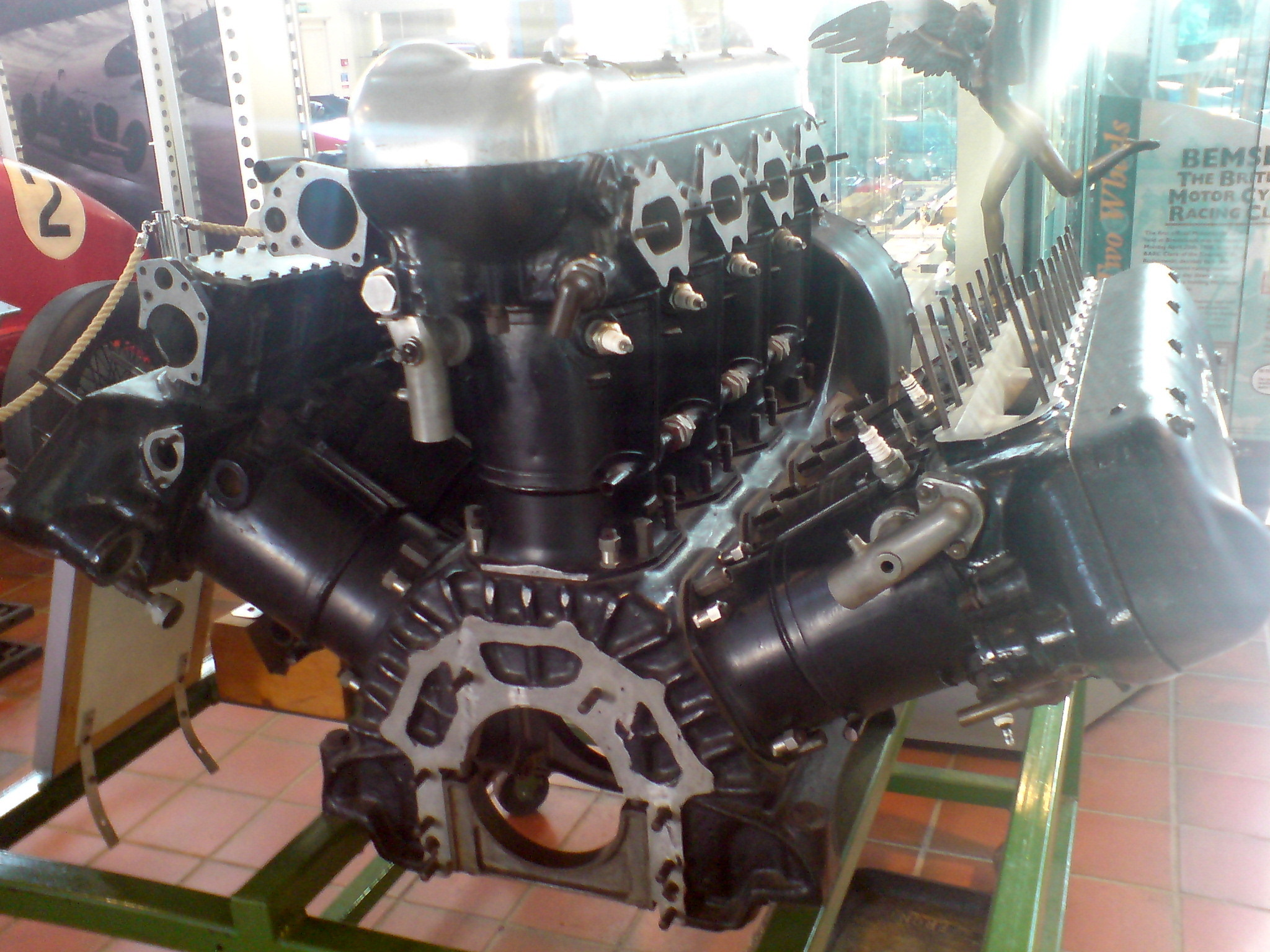
- The Hiro Type 14 was based on the Napier Lion W12 engine, like this one on displayed at Brooklands Museum
- Type: Piston W 12 aircraft engine
- National origin: Japan
- Manufacturer: Hiro
- First run: 1929
- Major applications: Hiro H2H
- Developed from: Napier Lion

The Hiro Type 14 engine, (full designation Hiro Type 14 500 hp water-cooled W-12), was a water-cooled twelve-cylinder W engine built by the Hiro Naval Arsenal (Hiro Kaigun Ko-sho) for the Imperial Japanese Navy. The Hiro Type 14 engine design was based on the Napier Lion. Like the parent engine, and the Lorraine 12 Eb, it had three banks of four cylinders each, with the center bank upright, and the other two banks angled outward 60 degrees. In some cases the W engine is referred to as the broad arrow configuration, due to its shape resembling the British government broad arrow property mark. The first aircraft to be powered by a Type 14 engine was the Hiro H2H flying boat.

== Design and development ==
Japan's military leaders discovered the value of aircraft while participating in World War I. It was necessary to import all of its military aircraft and engines as there was no aviation manufacturing industry in Japan at that time. The Imperial Japanese did not want to rely on foreign products, yet that was all that was available. To remedy this, Japan began importing state-of-the-art aircraft from around the world, and after close examination and study they incorporated the best features of each into their own design, thereby creating a uniquely superior Japanese designed and built product.

In late 1928 the IJN imported a Supermarine Southampton II from Britain. The Southampton was a twin-engine biplane flying boat, with the 500 hp (373 kW) Napier Lion VA W-block tractor engines mounted between the wings. It was one of the most successful flying boats of the between-war period.

In 1929, Lieut-Cdr (Ordnance) Jun Okamura was assigned as chief designer to assist in the design of a new Japanese aircraft using the Southampton as a starting point. After performance testing at Yokosuka, the Southampton was ferried to the Hiro Naval Arsenal for further study. Testing and evaluation revealed several construction innovations when compared to the German flying boats that were also undergoing evaluation. Those features included an all-metal hull and simplified construction, both of which the Japanese Navy hoped to incorporate into the replacement for the outdated Type 15 Flying-boat.

The Napier Lion engines were closely examined by the engineers at Hiro as well. They were charged with creating a new Japanese designed and built engine based on the Napier engine that powered the Supermarine Southampton II. The new engine was identified as the Type 14 engine, as it was accepted in the 14th year of Emperor Taishō's reign, as that was the designation method used at the time.

The 550 hp Type 14 engine, although notionally more powerful than the Napier Lion, flight tests of the H2H indicated the Type 14 engine had poor performance due to insufficient power, and it was replaced by the 600 hp Hiro Type 91 engine (an enlarged development of the Type 14) when manufacturing was shifted to Aichi in 1931.

== Applications ==
- Hiro H2H1

== Specifications ==
=== General characteristics ===
- Type: W-12 piston engine

== See also ==
Comparable engines

- Napier Lion

Related lists

- List of aircraft engines
