= Supermarine Scapa =

British general reconnaissance flying boat

Scapa
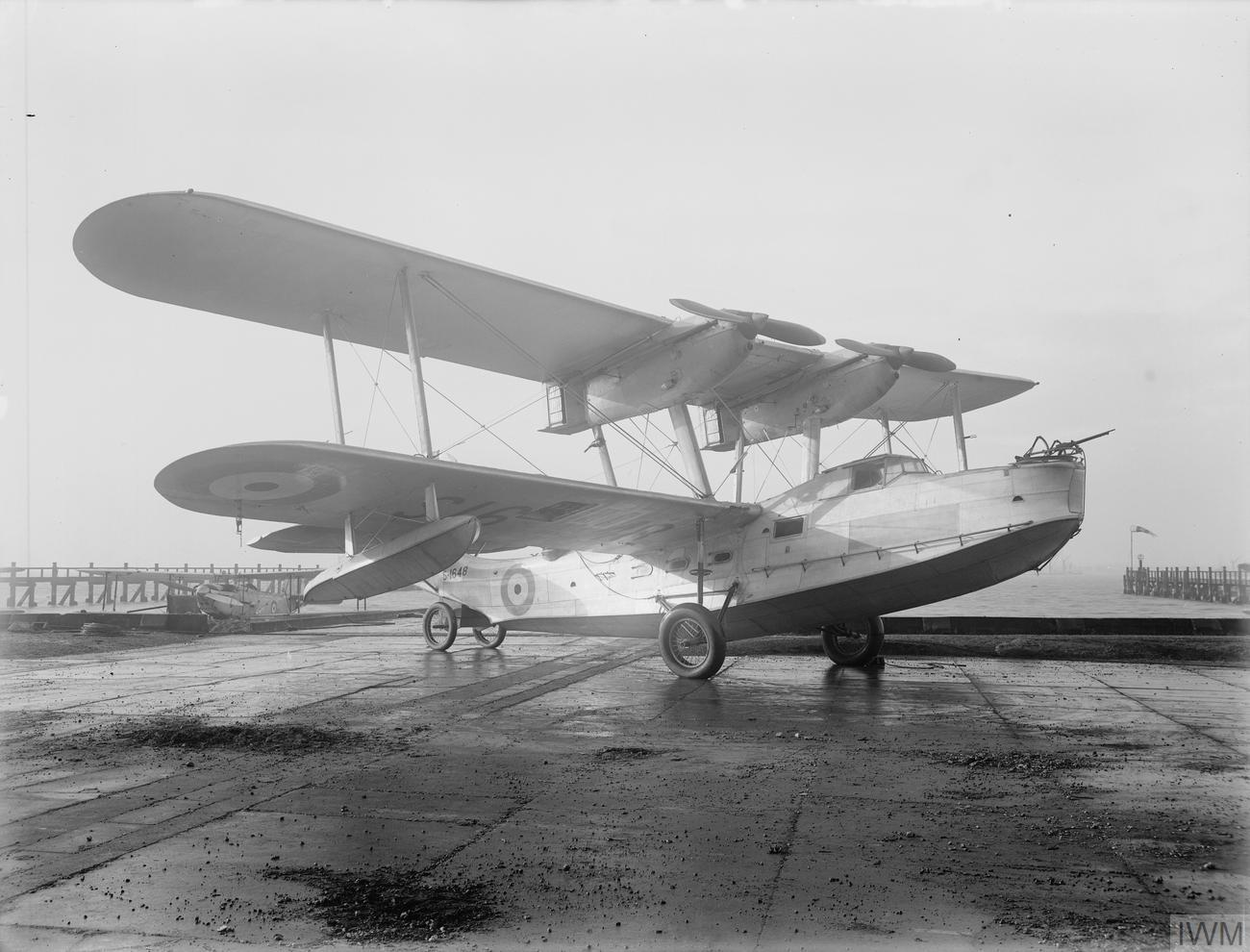
- A Supermarine Scapa at the MAEE at Felixstowe, in 1933

General information
- Type: Reconnaissance flying boat,
- National origin: United Kingdom
- Manufacturer: Supermarine Aviation Works (Vickers), Ltd.
- Designer: R.J. Mitchell
- Primary user: Royal Air Force
- Number built: 15

History
- Introduction date: 1935
- First flight: 1932
- Retired: 1939
- Developed from: Supermarine Southampton
- Developed into: Supermarine Stranraer

The Supermarine Scapa was a British general reconnaissance flying boat built by Supermarine that was used by the Royal Air Force between 1935 and 1939. It was developed from the Southampton and formed the basis of the Supermarine Stranraer.

== Development ==
After experimenting with a three-engine design of flying boat, the Nanok, Supermarine's chief designer R. J. Mitchell decided that the hydrodynamic design developed in the twin-engined Supermarine Southampton, would be suitable for the next aircraft.

A prototype, designated the Southampton IV, was built. It had a hull that exceeded expectations in tests. An Air Ministry Specification was received in November 1931. The test pilot Joseph "Mutt" Summers took first flew the prototype on 8 July 1932, by which time the name of the type had been changed to Scapa.

After 15 Scapas were built, production was changed to a more powerful development, the Supermarine Stranraer.

== Design ==
Cut-away illustration of the Scarpa from Flight magazine (June 1935)

The Scapa's hull was an all-metal structure, while the wing and tail surfaces had metal structure with fabric covering. The two Rolls-Royce Kestrel V12 engines were mounted in nacelles underslung from the upper wing, and there were two fins, each placed at the mid semi-span of the tailplane. Similar to the Southampton, there were three gun positions: one in the nose, and two staggered in the rear fuselage. Each provided with a single .303 British (7.7 mm) caliber Lewis Mk.I machine guns.

== Operators ==
United Kingdom

- Royal Air Force
  - No. 202 Squadron RAF
  - No. 204 Squadron RAF
  - No. 228 Squadron RAF
  - No. 240 Squadron RAF

== Specifications (Scapa) ==
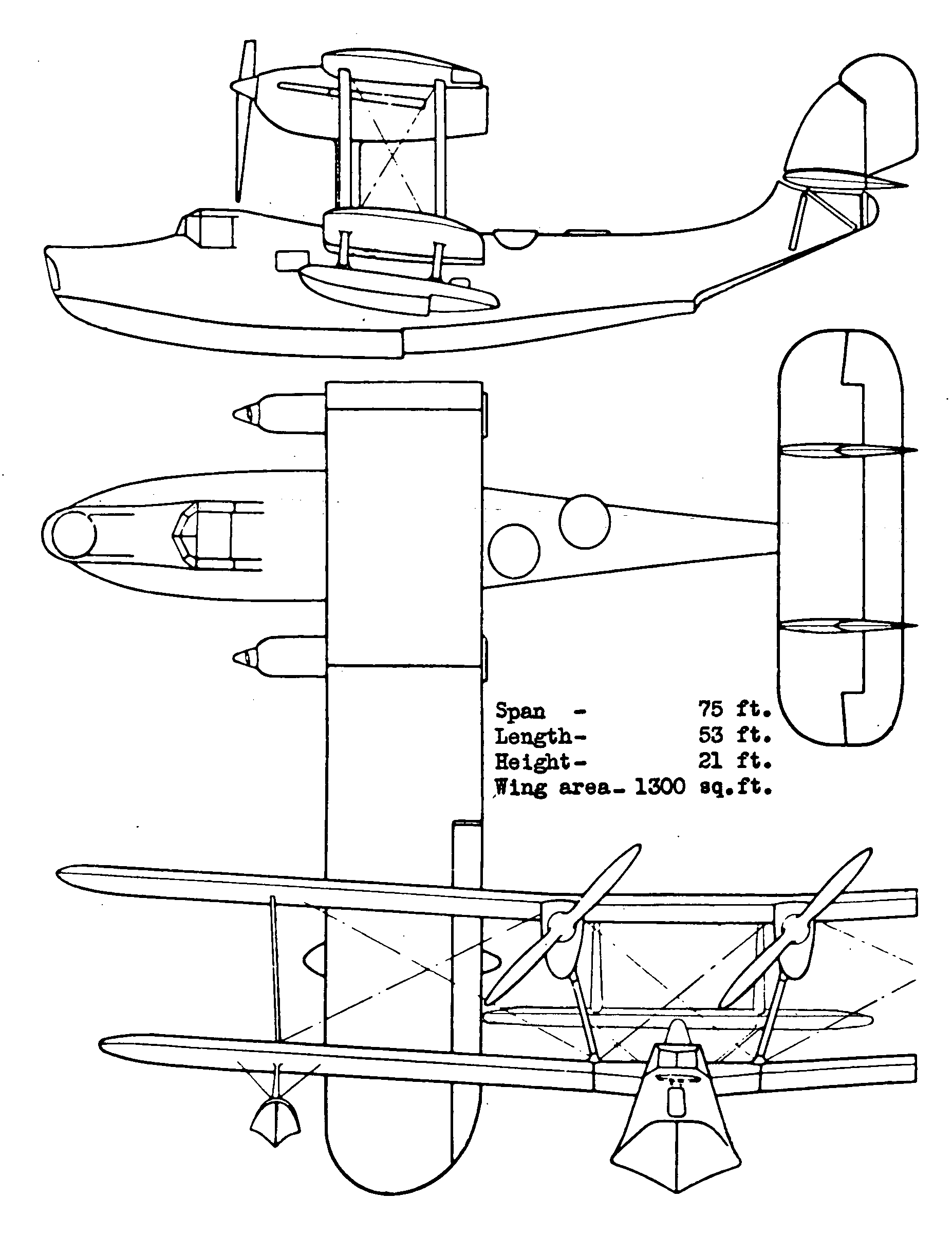
Supermarine Scapa 3-view drawing from NACA-AC-203

Data from Supermarine Aircraft Since 1914

General characteristics

- Crew: 5
- Length: 53 ft 0 in (16.15 m) on beaching gear
- Wingspan: 75 ft 0 in (22.86 m)
- Height: 21 ft 0 in (6.40 m) on beaching gear
- Wing area: 1,300 sq ft (120 m^{2})
- Empty weight: 10,030 lb (4,550 kg)
- Gross weight: 16,080 lb (7,294 kg)
- Powerplant: 2 × Rolls-Royce Kestrel IIIMS V-12 liquid-cooled piston engines, 525 hp (391 kW) each
- Propellers: 2-bladed wooden fixed-pitch propellers

Performance

- Maximum speed: 142 mph (229 km/h, 123 kn) at 3,280 ft (1,000 m)
- Cruise speed: 100 mph (160 km/h, 87 kn) at 5,000 ft (1,524 m)
- Alighting speed: 64 mph (56 kn; 103 km/h)
- Range: 1,000 mi (1,600 km, 870 nmi) with 2,650 lb (1,202 kg) military load
- Service ceiling: 15,500 ft (4,700 m)
- Rate of climb: 625 ft/min (3.18 m/s)
- Time to altitude: 9,840 ft (2,999 m) in 20 minutes
- Wing loading: 12.3 lb/sq ft (60 kg/m^{2})
- Power/mass: 0.065 hp/lb (0.107 kW/kg)

Armament

- Guns: 3 × 0.303 in (7.7 mm) Lewis guns, one in bow and two amidships
- Bombs: 1,000 lb (454 kg) bombload under the wings

== See also ==
Related development

- Supermarine Southampton
- Supermarine Stranraer

Aircraft of comparable role, configuration, and era

- Hall PH
- Hiro H1H
- Hiro H2H
- Naval Aircraft Factory PN

Related lists

- List of aircraft of the Royal Air Force
- List of flying boats and floatplanes

== Sources ==
- Andrews, C. F.; Morgan, Eric B. (1981). Supermarine Aircraft since 1914. London: Putnam. ISBN 978-03701-0-018-0.
