= Hiro Type 94 =

Aircraft Engine

Type 94
- Type: W18 liquid-cooled aircraft engine
- National origin: Japan
- Manufacturer: Hiro Naval Arsenal
- First run: 1933
- Major applications: Hiro G2H
- Developed from: Hiro Type 91

The Hiro Type 94 was a W18 liquid-cooled aircraft engine. It was the first indigenous Japanese aero engine to achieve a power output of more than 1,000 hp (746 kW). Two Type 94 engines powered the Imperial Japanese Navy's Hiro G2H land-based bomber, which first flew in 1933.

Unlike earlier Hiro W engines, which used Lorraine-Dietrich style cast cylinder pairs, the Type 94 used monobloc castings for each of its three six-cylinder banks. The angle between the cylinder banks was also reduced from 60° to 45° which gave the engine a narrower profile thereby reducing aerodynamic drag.

== Applications ==
- Hiro G2H land-based bomber

== Specifications ==
Data from Goodwin

=== General characteristics ===
- Type: 45° W-18 liquid-cooled piston engine
- Bore: 145 mm (5.7 in)
- Stroke: 160 mm (6.3 in)
- Displacement: 47.5 L (2,899 cu in)
- Length: 2,175 L (132,727 cu in)
- Width: 1,110 mm (43.7 in)
- Height: 1,104 mm (43.5 in)
- Dry weight: 740 kg (1,631 lb)

=== Components ===
- Supercharger: Naturally aspirated (Note: Development work was undertaken on a supercharged variant of the engine; however, it did not enter production.)
- Cooling system: Liquid
- Reduction gear: 0.5:1

=== Performance ===
- Power output: 880 kW (1,180 hp)
- Compression ratio: 6

== See also ==
Comparable engines

- Hispano-Suiza 18R
- Isotta Fraschini Asso 750

Related lists

- List of aircraft engines
