= Kawanishi H6K =

Imperial Japanese flying boat

H6K
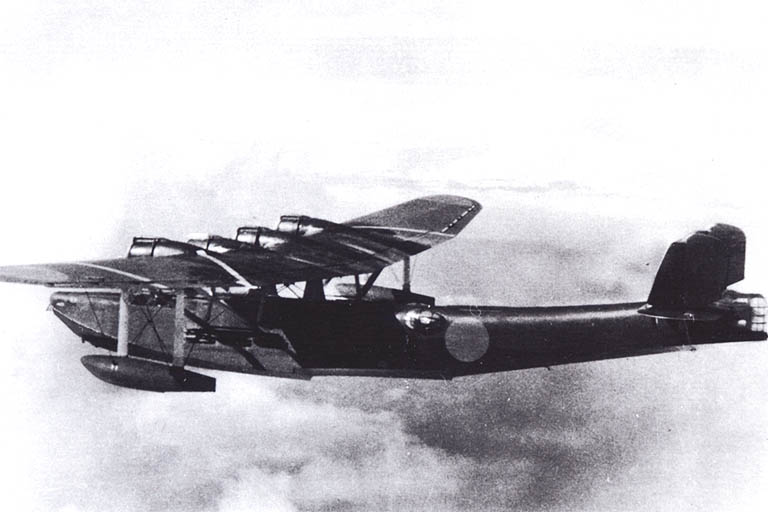

General information
- Type: Maritime patrol flying boat
- National origin: Japan
- Manufacturer: Kawanishi
- Status: Retired
- Primary user: Imperial Japanese Navy Air Service
- Number built: 215 or 217

History
- Introduction date: January 1938
- First flight: 14 July 1936
- Retired: 1945
- Developed from: Kawanishi H3K

The Kawanishi H6K was a large maritime patrol flying boat designed and produced by the Japanese aviation manufacturer Kawanishi Aircraft Company. Flown by the Imperial Japanese Navy (IJN) during World War II, the service designed it "Type 97 Large Flying Boat" (九七式大型飛行艇) while the Allied reporting name for the type was Mavis. The British mistakenly identified this aircraft as the Kawanishi Navy 97 Mavis.

The H6K was developed in the mid-1930s in response to a demanding requirement issued by the IJN in early 1934. The design effort was aided by knowledge gained from extensive studies conducted in 1933 towards an abortive earlier specification, a visit to the British flying boat manufacturer Short Brothers, and Kawanishi's licensed production of the Short Rangoon as the Kawanishi H3K. The resulting flying boat featured four engines, a parasol wing, and a sizable hull suspended beneath this wing using numerous struts. The first prototype performed its maiden flight on 14 July 1936.

Following its introduction to IJN service in January 1938, the H6K was used for a variety of missions, including aerial reconnaissance, transport, bombing, maritime patrol, and executive transport by the IJN. It saw action during both the Sino-Japanese War and the Pacific War. While the type was withdrawn from bombing missions due to unfavourable odds on surviving interception by Allied fighters, it proved to be quite well suited to the maritime patrol mission. Furthermore, Japan's national flag carrier, Imperial Japanese Airways, also operated a handful of H6Ks to carry both air mail and passengers across its Pacific routes. During the latter half of World War II, it was succeeded in IJN service by the Kawanishi H8K.

== Design and development ==
The origins of the H6K can be traced back to early 1933 and the issuing of an Imperial Japanese Navy (IJN) requirement that sought a new long-range flying boat. The Japanese aviation manufacturer Kawanishi Aircraft Company opted to respond with two separate designs, which were internally designated Model Q (powered by four engines) and Model R, (powered by three engines). Between March 1933 and September of that year, extensive studies, including wind tunnel and water tank testing, was conducted; however, IJN officials were not satisfied with the resulting performance data. Accordingly, in early 1934, a revised specification was issued, which explicitly stipulated the use of four engines and a range of at least 2,500 nautical miles while maintaining a cruising speed of no less than 120 kts; this was a relatively high performance demand for a flying boat of the era, exceeding contemporaries such as the Sikorsky S-42.

Kawanishi promptly set about producing a design to fulfil this more demanding specification. The firm's design team, headed by Yoshio Hashiguchi and Shizuo Kikahura, opted to incorporate knowledge that had been gleaned from a recent visit to the Short Brothers factory in the UK, at that time one of the world's leading producers of flying boats. Furthermore, Kawanishi had gained beneficial experience from the production of the Kawanishi H3K, which was a license-built and enlarged version of the Short Rangoon. Internally designated as the Type S, the resulting design was of a large four-engined monoplane with twin tails. The hull was suspended beneath its parasol wing via a series of inverted-V struts and braced by low-mounted parallel struts. Military H6Ks could be provisioned with various combinations of armaments, including multiple Type 92 machine guns for self-defence, while offensive munitions typically comprised a pair of 800kg torpedoes or up to 1,000kg of bombs.

On 14 July 1936, the first prototype performed its maiden flight, piloted by Katsuji Kondo. Various modifications were made to after this first flight, including the movement of forward step rearwards to improve the flying boat's handling while on the water. On 25 July 1936, following the swift completion of manufacturer's trials, this prototype was delivered to the IJN for service trials, the conclusion of which was that, aside from being somewhat underpowered, the flying boat had exhibited satisfactory performance in all other categories. Water handling was praised, having demonstrated a high degree of stability along with good spray characteristics. Two additional prototypes were delivered in 1937 and another during the following year. In contrast to the first prototype, these featured an enlarged fins, a redesigned dorsal turret, and increased span ailerons. Collectively, these changes refined the flying boat's handling in both the water and the air; some of the prototypes were also outfitted with more powerful engines.

Following the completion of service trials, three of the four prototypes were refitted and introduced to IJN service in January 1934; the type was assigned the service designation of Navy Type 97 Flying Boat. After quantity production of the type had been established, a batch of ten H6K2 were built ahead of a larger run of 124 H6K4, the principal change of which was an expanded fuel capacity. For a time, production of the H6K4 took priority over most other models. All models of the H6K were powered by four radial engines of different types. While some flying boats were upgraded with the 1,000 hp Kinsei 46, the H6K5 were powered by the 1,300 hp Kinsei 51/53 instead. The H6K prototype was powered by four nine-cylinder Nakajima Hikari 2, capable of producing up to 840 hp. Later stage development of the H6K had been conducted as a fallback measure to the more ambitious Kawanishi H8K.

The type was also procured as a civilian air transport for Imperial Japanese Airways (which was Japan's national airline at that time); these flying boats were outfitted with an onboard toilet, galley, and sufficient cabin space to accommodate up to 18 passengers. When used in this capacity, individual H6Ks were assigned civil registrations. Multiple transport models of the K8K, lacking any armament, were produced, including a pair of H6K4-L flying boats used for VIP transport.

== Operational history ==
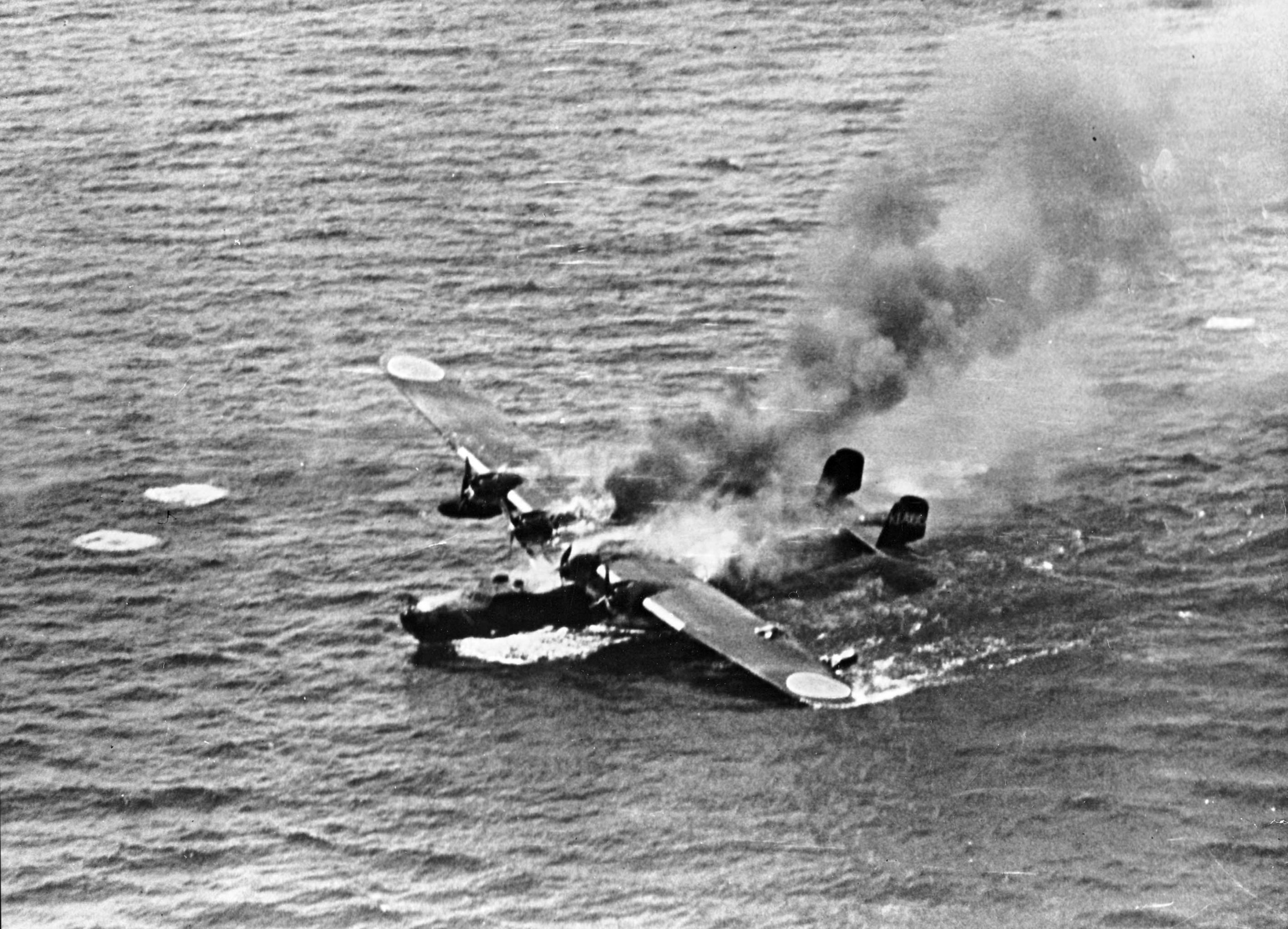
Damaged H6K on water, 1944

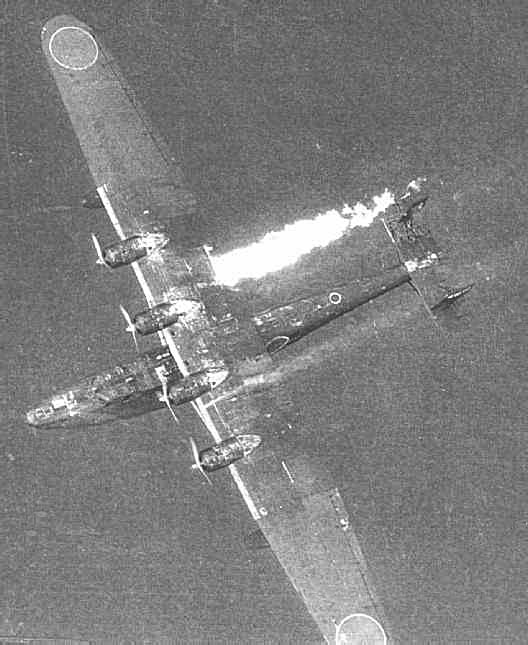
An H6K with a burning wing.

Starting in early 1938, the H6Ks were deployed by the IJN; it made its combat debut during the Sino-Japanese War. Sixteen aircraft were also flown by Japan's national flag carrier, Imperial Japanese Airways, to perform mail and passenger service across the Pacific.

By the start of the Pacific War in December 1941, the type was in widespread use, the IJN having assembled four Kōkūtai (naval air groups) that were equipped with a total of 66 H6K4s. These flying boats were used to conduct various missions, including long range maritime reconnaissance, transport, and bomber alike. The majority of sorties conducted by the H6K were for maritime reconnaissance operations.

On numerous occasions, H6Ks were used to bomb land targets across the Dutch East Indies and Papua New Guinea. On 12 December 1941, during the Battle of Wake Island, an H6K bombed Wake island, but was subsequently shot down by an Grumman F4F Wildcat. The lack of armour and self-sealing fuel tanks contributed to frequent losses when the type was intercepted by Allied fighters; the IJN ultimately opted to discontinue bombing operations of its H6Ks due to the unfavourable odds. As the conflict progressed, early-built H6Ks were displaced from the maritime patrol mission as more capable newer models were delivered; the older flying boats were often fitted with benches and used as transports instead.

On 15 February 1942, a Curtiss P-40 Warhawk intercepted an H6K, about 190 km (120 mi) west of Darwin, Australia, which had attacked Allied shipping; both the P-40 and H6K were shot down. The type had some success across both Southeast Asia and the Southwest Pacific. The H6Ks were capable of excellent endurance for the era, flying patrols of up to 24 hours, and thus were often used to conduct long-range reconnaissance and bombing missions. When flown from bases in the Dutch East Indies, they could fly over a large portion of Australia. As the war progressed, the H6K became increasingly vulnerable to a newer generation of fighter aircraft, which were typically more heavily armed and faster flying. In front-line service, it was replaced by the Kawanishi H8K. It continued in service throughout the conflict, but typically restricted to operating in areas where the risk of interception was relatively low. As such, the type remained in active service through to the Surrender of Japan.

== Variants ==
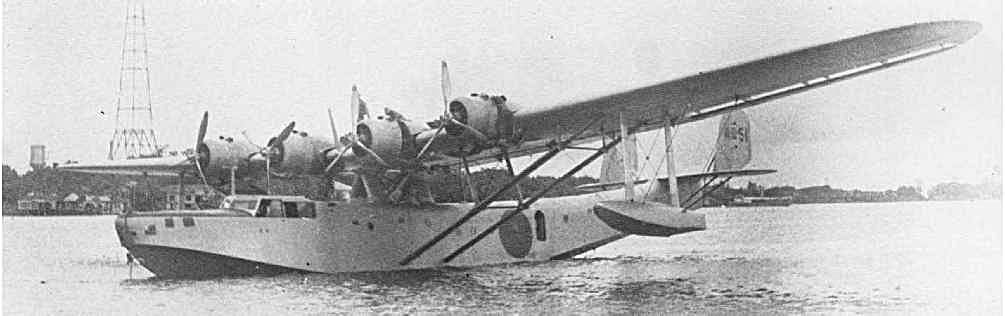
An H6K2-L Navy transport flying boat Type 97

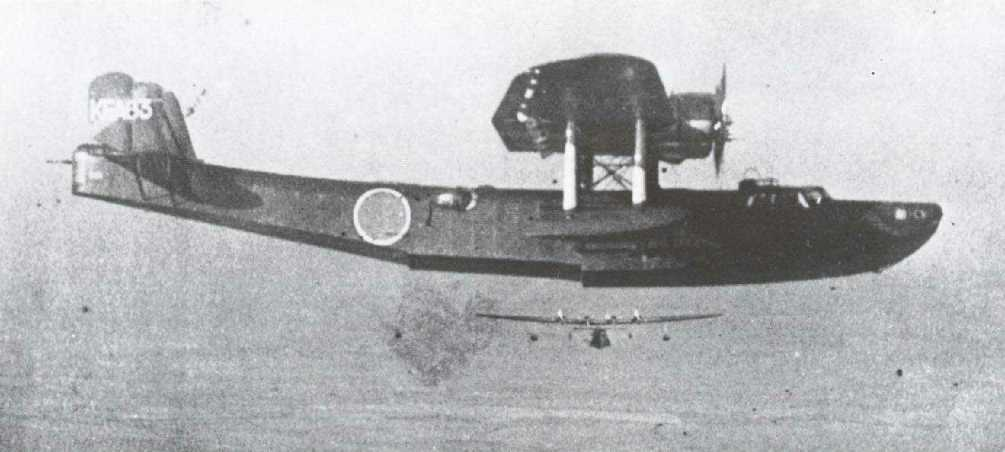
H6K-3

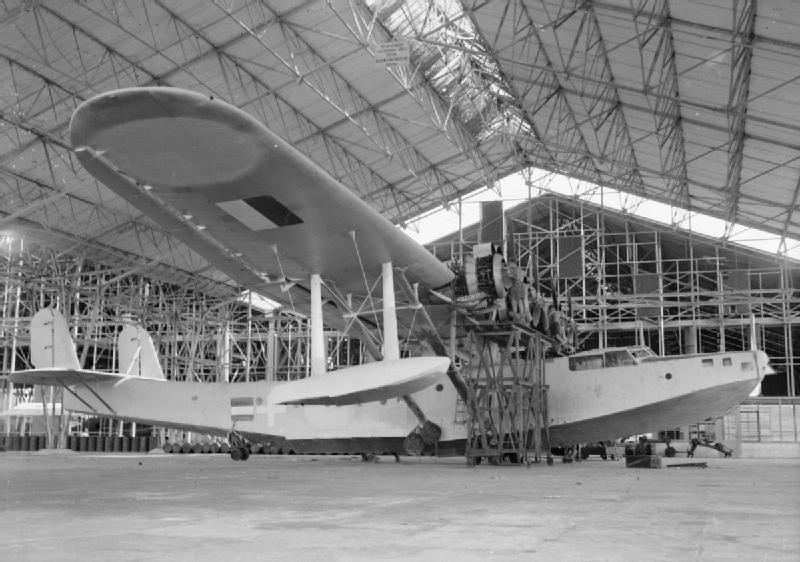
Royal Air Force mechanics inspecting an H6K at Soerabaja, Java, prior to a test flight in January 1946. The Indonesia flag was added by nationalists and the additional blue band was added to the fuselage marking by the Dutch

H6K1
Evaluation prototypes with four Nakajima Hikari 2 engines, four built.
H6K1 (navy flying boat Type 97 Model 1)
Prototypes with 746 kW (1,000 hp) Mitsubishi Kinsei 43 engines, three converted from the original H6K1 prototypes
H6K2 Model 11
First production model. Includes two H6K2-L officer transport modification, 10 built.
H6K2-L (navy transport flying boat Type 97)
Unarmed transport version of H6K2 powered by Mitsubishi Kinsei 43 engines, 16 built
H6K3 Model 21
Modified transport version of H6K2 for VIPs and high-ranking officers, 2 built
H6K4 Model 22
Major production version, modified H6K2 with revised weapons, some with 694 kW (930 hp) Mitsubishi Kinsei 46 engines. Fuel capacity increased from 7,764 L (1,708 Imp gal) to 13,410 L (2,950 Imp gal). Includes two H6K4-L transport versions, 100 to 127 (if other numbers are all correct) built.
H6K4-L
Transport version of H6K4, similar to H6K2-L, but with Mitsubishi Kinsei 46 engines, 20 built and another two converted from the H6K4
H6K5 Model 23
Fitted with 969 kW (1,300 hp) Mitsubishi Kinsei 51 or 53 engines and new upper turret replacing the open position, 36 built

== Operators ==
Japan

- Imperial Japanese Navy Air Service
- Imperial Japanese Airways

Used on the routes Yokohama-Saipan-Koror (Palau)-Timor, Saigon-Bangkok and Saipan-Truk-Ponape-Jaluit
Indonesia

- Air Service Volunteer Corps - A single H6K5 flying boat was restored to flight by British and Indonesian forces during the Indonesian War of Independence.

== Specifications (H6K4 Model 22) ==
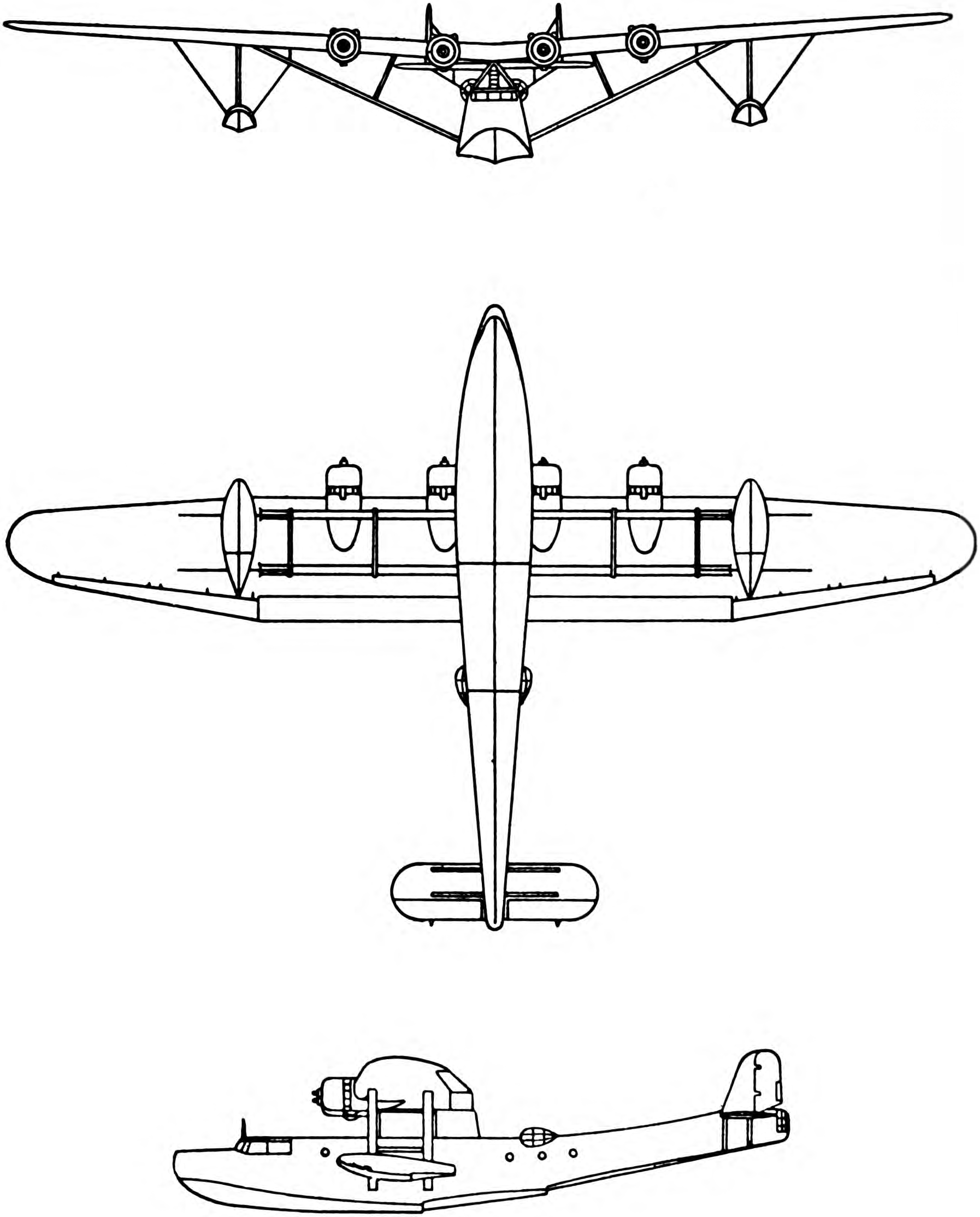
3-view drawing of the Kawanishi H6K

Data from Warplanes of the Second World War, Volume Five: Flying Boats, and Japanese Aircraft of the Pacific War

General characteristics

- Crew: nine
- Length: 25.63 m (84 ft 1 in)
- Wingspan: 40 m (131 ft 3 in)
- Height: 6.27 m (20 ft 7 in)
- Wing area: 170 m^{2} (1,800 sq ft)
- Empty weight: 11,707 kg (25,810 lb)
- Gross weight: 17,000 kg (37,479 lb)
- Max takeoff weight: 21,500 kg (47,399 lb)
- Powerplant: 4 × Mitsubishi Kinsei 43 14-cylinder air-cooled radial piston engines, 750 kW (1,000 hp) each for take-off

738 kW (990 hp) at 2,800 m (9,200 ft)
(H6K4 Model 2-3 and H6K4-L 690 kW (930 hp) Kinsei 46)

Performance

- Maximum speed: 340 km/h (210 mph, 180 kn) at 4,000 m (13,000 ft)
- Cruise speed: 222 km/h (138 mph, 120 kn) at 4,000 m (13,000 ft)
- Range: 4,797 km (2,981 mi, 2,590 nmi)
- Ferry range: 6,080 km (3,780 mi, 3,280 nmi)
- Wing loading: 100 kg/m^{2} (20 lb/sq ft)
- Power/mass: 0.1731 kW/kg (0.1053 hp/lb)

Armament

- Guns: * 1 × 7.7 mm (0.30 in) Type 92 machine gun in nose
- 1 × Type 92 machine gun in spine
- 2 × Type 92 machine guns in waist blisters
- 1 × 20 mm (0.79 in) Type 99 Mark 1 machine gun in tail turret
- Bombs: * 2 × 800 kg (1,764 lb) torpedoes

or

- 1,000 kg (2,205 lb) of bombs

== See also ==
Related development

- Short Rangoon
- Kawanishi H3K
- Kawanishi H8K

Aircraft of comparable role, configuration, and era

- Aichi H9A
- Blackburn Sydney
- Consolidated PBY Catalina
- Dornier Do 24
- Latécoère 300
- Martin M-130
- Potez-CAMS 141

Related lists

- List of aircraft of World War II
- List of military aircraft of Japan
- List of seaplanes and flying boats
