= Hiro H1H =

Japanese flying boat

H1H
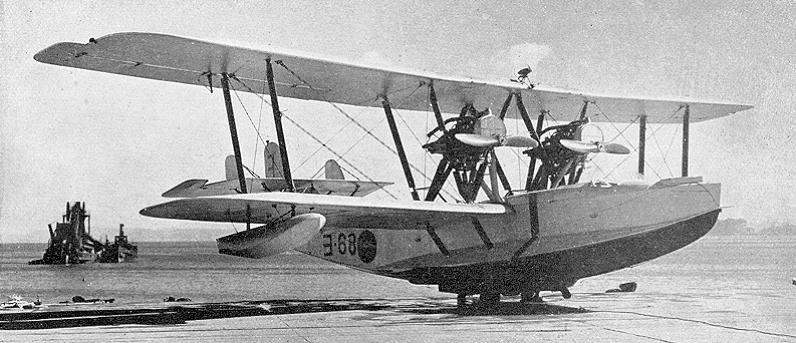
- Late production H1H1 on a launching trolly.

General information
- Type: Patrol flying boat
- National origin: Japan
- Manufacturer: Hiro Naval Arsenal
- Primary user: IJN Air Service
- Number built: 65

History
- Manufactured: 1927–1934
- First flight: 1925
- Retired: 1938
- Developed from: Felixstowe F.5

The Hiro H1H (or Navy Type 15) was a 1920s Japanese bomber or reconnaissance biplane flying boat developed from the Felixstowe F.5 by the Hiro Naval Arsenal for the Imperial Japanese Navy. The aircraft were built by Hiro, the Yokosuka Naval Arsenal and Aichi.

== Design and development ==
Following licensed production of the Felixstowe F.5 for the Imperial Japanese Navy, the company developed an improved version known as the H1H or Navy Type 15. The aircraft was built with three different engine types fitted, the Navy Type 15-I with a wooden hull had longer-span upper wings and the Navy Type 15-II had four-bladed propellers. The H1H remained in front line naval service through the 1930s.

== Variants ==
H1H1
Variant powered by two 450hp (336kW) Lorraine W-12 engines.
H1H2
Variant powered by either two 450hp (336kW) Lorraine W-12 or two 500hp (373kW) BMW VII engines.
H1H3
Variant powered by two 450hp (336kW) Lorraine W-12 engines.

== Operators ==
Japan

- Imperial Japanese Navy Air Service

== Specifications (H1H1) ==
H1H2 side elevation, all-metal hull with Dornier-type external stiffeners.

Data from Illustrated Encyclopedia of Aircraft

General characteristics

- Length: 49 ft 7 in (15.11 m)
- Wingspan: 75 ft 4.5 in (22.97 m)
- Height: 17 ft 0.5 in (5.19 m)
- Wing area: 1,345.53 sq ft (125 m^{2})
- Empty weight: 8,862 lb (4,020 kg)
- Gross weight: 13,448 lb (6,100 kg)
- Powerplant: 2 × Lorraine 12E 12-cylinder piston engine , 450 hp (336 kW) each

Performance

- Maximum speed: 106 mph (170 km/h, 92 kn)
- Endurance: 14 hours 30 minutes

Armament

- 2 × 7.7 mm (0.303 in) machine guns (one at bow cockpit and one midships)
- up to 300 kg (661 lb) of bombs

== See also ==
H1H in flight.

Related development

- Felixstowe F.5
- Hiro H2H

Aircraft of comparable role, configuration, and era

- English Electric Kingston
- Supermarine Swan
- Supermarine Southampton
- Saunders A.14
- Naval Aircraft Factory PN
- Supermarine Scapa
- Hall PH

Related lists

- List of military aircraft of Japan
- List of seaplanes and flying boats
