= Hiro G2H =

Japanese bomber/reconnaissance aircraft

General information
- Type: Long-range bomber/reconnaissance monoplane
- Manufacturer: Hiro Naval Arsenal
- Primary user: Imperial Japanese Navy Air Service
- Number built: 8

History
- First flight: 1933 may

The Hiro G2H (or Hiro Navy Type 95 Twin-engined Land-based Attacker) was a 1930s Japanese bomber or reconnaissance monoplane designed and built by the Hiro Naval Arsenal for the Imperial Japanese Navy.

== Design and development ==
The Hiro G2H1 was one of the first long-range land-based bomber/reconnaissance aircraft designed and built for the Imperial Japanese Navy. The prototype appeared in 1933 but suffered from structural weakness. The aircraft was a low-wing, cantilever monoplane powered by two 1,180 hp (880 kW) Type 94 piston engines. The aircraft struggled with the unreliability of the engines, and only eight aircraft were built. The development of the aircraft was costly in both manpower and finance, and the aircraft did not live up to expectations. However, the aircraft did give the Navy experience in the operation of long-range, land-based aircraft, which was to prove invaluable in the later Pacific War.

== Operational history ==
One aircraft was lost in an accident, but the rest operated against China during the Second Sino-Japanese War. In 1937, five aircraft were destroyed in a fire at their base on Cheju Island.

== Operator ==
Japan

- Imperial Japanese Navy Air Service

== Specifications (G2H1) ==
Data from The Illustrated Encyclopedia of Aircraft

General characteristics

- Crew: 6/7
- Length: 20.15 m (66 ft 1.25 in)
- Wingspan: 31.68 m (103 ft 11.25 in)
- Height: 6.28 m (20 ft 7.25 in)
- Wing area: 140 m^{2} (1,507 sq ft)
- Empty weight: 7,567 kg (16,682 lb)
- Gross weight: 11,000 kg (24,250 lb)
- Powerplant: 2 × Type 94 W-18 piston engine , 880 kW (1,180 hp) each

Performance

- Maximum speed: 245 km/h (152 mph, 132 kn)
- Range: 1,557 km (967 mi, 840 nmi)
- Service ceiling: 5,130 m (16,830 ft)

Armament

- 5× 7.7 mm (0.303in) machine-guns (two on pivoted nose mounting, two on dorsal ring mounting, one in a ventral dustbin)
- 6× 250kg (551lb) bomb or
- 4× 400kg (882lb) bombs on underwing racks
