= Friedrichshafen FF.60 =

FF.60
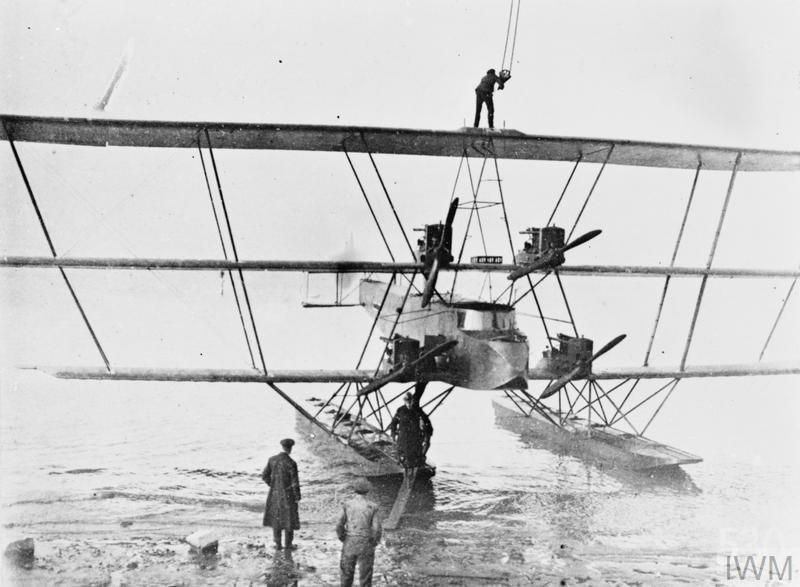
- A front view of the FF.60

General information
- Type: Experimental floatplane
- Manufacturer: Flugzeugbau Friedrichshafen
- Number built: 1

History
- First flight: November 1918

The Friedrichshafen FF.60 was a German prototype long-range maritime patrol floatplane developed during World War I by the Friedrichshafen Aircraft Company (Flugzeugbau Friedrichshafen) for the Naval Air Service of the Imperial German Navy (Marine-Fliegerabteilung of the Kaiserliche Marine). It was a four-engined triplane with a crew of four men. Three aircraft were ordered in 1918, but only one is known to have been completed as the war ended in November.

== Background and description ==
By late 1916, the vulnerability of the Zeppelins on reconnaissance missions over the North Sea had been recognized by the Naval Air Service and Rear Admiral (Konteradmiral) Otto Philipp, commander of the Naval Air Service, outlined requirements for three types of multi-engine seaplanes to replace the Zeppelins. The highest priority was for a four-engine maritime patrol aircraft with an endurance of 10–12 hours, capable of maintaining altitude on two engines, in a memorandum on 26 December. Philipp clarified on 10 February 1917 that the reconnaissance aircraft's tasks would be mine spotting, anti-submarine duties, and shipping control. The Naval Air Service placed an order for two aircraft in February 1918 and ordered another one in June to compare them with the very large floatplanes like the Zeppelin-Staaken L and the Gotha WD.27.

Despite its unusual triplane configuration, the FF.60 was built in the company's usual fashion from wire-braced wood covered by doped fabric. The cockpit was underneath the middle wing. The dorsal gunner's position was behind the wings and another position was located in the nose. The biplane tail structure consisted of two horizontal stabilizers and multiple vertical stabilizers fitted with rudders forming a box shape. The triplane was intended to handle waves up to sea state 4 so its two floats were connected to the fuselage and lower wing by 16 struts. The aircraft was armed with three 7.92 mm (0.312 in) Parabellum MG14 machine guns and it could carry a bomb load of 1,000 kg (2,205 lb). It was powered by four uncowled 170-metric-horsepower (130 kW) Mercedes D.IIIa engines; one pair was on the lower wing and the other on the middle wing.

Only one aircraft is known to have been completed as there is photographic evidence performing its taxiing trials. It made its first flight in November 1918, the month the war ended. The status of the other two prototypes ordered is unknown. When the Allies inspected the German seaplane bases in December 1918, they recorded four FF.60s at Norderney, although the serial numbers match those allocated to Friedrichshafen FF.33Js.

== Specifications (FF.60) ==
Data from Flugzeugbau Friedrichshafen GmbH

General characteristics

- Crew: 4
- Wingspan: 27 m (88 ft 7 in)
- Height: 8.25 m (27 ft 1 in)
- Wing area: 235 m^{2} (2,530 sq ft)
- Empty weight: 4,875 kg (10,748 lb)
- Gross weight: 7,342 kg (16,186 lb)
- Fuel capacity: 1,467 kg (3,234 lb)
- Powerplant: 4 × Mercedes D.IIIa 6-cylinder water-cooled inline piston engines, 130 kW (170 hp) each
- Propellers: 2-bladed fixed pitch propellers

Performance

- Maximum speed: 140 km/h (87 mph, 76 kn)

Armament

- Guns: 3 × 7.92 mm (0.312 in) Parabellum MG14 machine guns
- Bombs: 1,000 kg (2,200 lb) of bombs

== See also ==
Related lists

- List of military aircraft of Germany
- List of flying boats and floatplanes

== Bibliography ==
- Andersson, Lennart & Sanger, Ray (2014). Retribution and Recovery: German Aircraft and Aviation 1919 to 1922. Staplefield, UK: Air-Britain (Historians). ISBN 978-0-85130-467-0.
- Borzutzki, Siegfried (1993). Flugzeugbau Friedrichshafen GmbH: Diplom-Ingenieur Theodor Kober [Friedrichshafen Aircraft Company: Diploma-Engineer Theodore Kober] (in German). Berlin: Burbach. ISBN 3-927513-60-1.
- Gray, Peter & Thetford, Owen (1987) [1970]. German Aircraft of the First World War (2nd ed.). London: Putnam. ISBN 0-85177-809-7.
- Haddow, George William & Grosz, Peter Michael (1988) [1962]. The German Giants: The German R-Planes 1914 – 1918 (3rd ed.). London: Putnam. ISBN 0-85177-812-7.
- Herris, Jack (2016). Friedrichshafen Aircraft of WWI: A Centennial Perspective on Great War Airplanes. Great War Aviation Centennial Series. Vol. 21. Charleston, South Carolina: Aeronaut Books. ISBN 978-1-935881-35-3.
- Nowarra, Heinz J.; Robertson, Bruce & Cooksley, Peter G. (1966). Marine Aircraft of the 1914–1918 War. Letchworth: Harleyford Publications. OCLC 123198808.
