= Supermarine Swan =

British commercial biplane flying boat

Swan
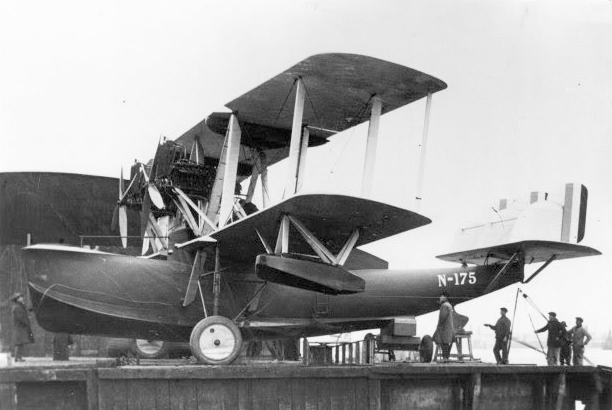
- The Swan at Supermarine's works at Woolston, Southampton

General information
- Type: Maritime reconnaissance/passenger flying boat
- National origin: United Kingdom
- Manufacturer: Supermarine
- Designer: R. J. Mitchell
- Status: Prototype
- Primary users: Imperial Airways Royal Air Force
- Number built: 1

History
- Introduction date: 1926
- First flight: 25 March 1924
- Retired: 1927
- Developed into: Supermarine Southampton

The Supermarine Swan was a 1920s British commercial biplane flying boat designed by R.J. Mitchell. A single machine was built by Supermarine at their works at Woolston, Southampton. The world's first twin-engine amphibian aircraft, it was the precursor to the Supermarine Southampton.

Completed as a wooden aerial reconnaissance flying boat, the Swan first flew on 25 March 1924. It was on display at Woolston during a visit by the Prince of Wales in June 1924. In 1926, it was registered as G-EBJY, having been converted for use as a passenger carrier, and was loaned to Imperial Airways to supplement their commercial fleet. The Swan's accommodation was modified to allow for up 10 passengers. After being used for a passenger service between England and France, the Swan was returned to the Air Ministry in March 1927. It was scrapped the following year.

== Design and development ==
The Supermarine Swan was a wooden biplane amphibian aircraft. It was designed by R. J. Mitchell, the chief designer at Supermarine. Mitchell designed the aircraft in parallel with the Supermarine Scylla, as a replacement for the Royal Air Force's standard flying boat at that time, the Felixstowe F5. The Swan first appeared in Mitchell's planning drawings as a "Twin Engined Commercial Flying Boat", which date from July 1922. An artist's impression of the design was used in Supermarine press advertisements during 1922 and 1923.

The Swan was ordered to the Air Ministry's specification 21/22. It was the world's first twin-engine amphibian aircraft. Mitchell's original plan was for an aircraft with two-bay wings of equal span which folded forwards to save storage space. The accommodation for 12 passengers in the hull was below the cockpit, which was fitted with side windscreens for the crew of two, who were otherwise unprotected from the weather. The engines were positioned leading over the front edge of the wing, which had a span designed to be large enough for the engine mounts.

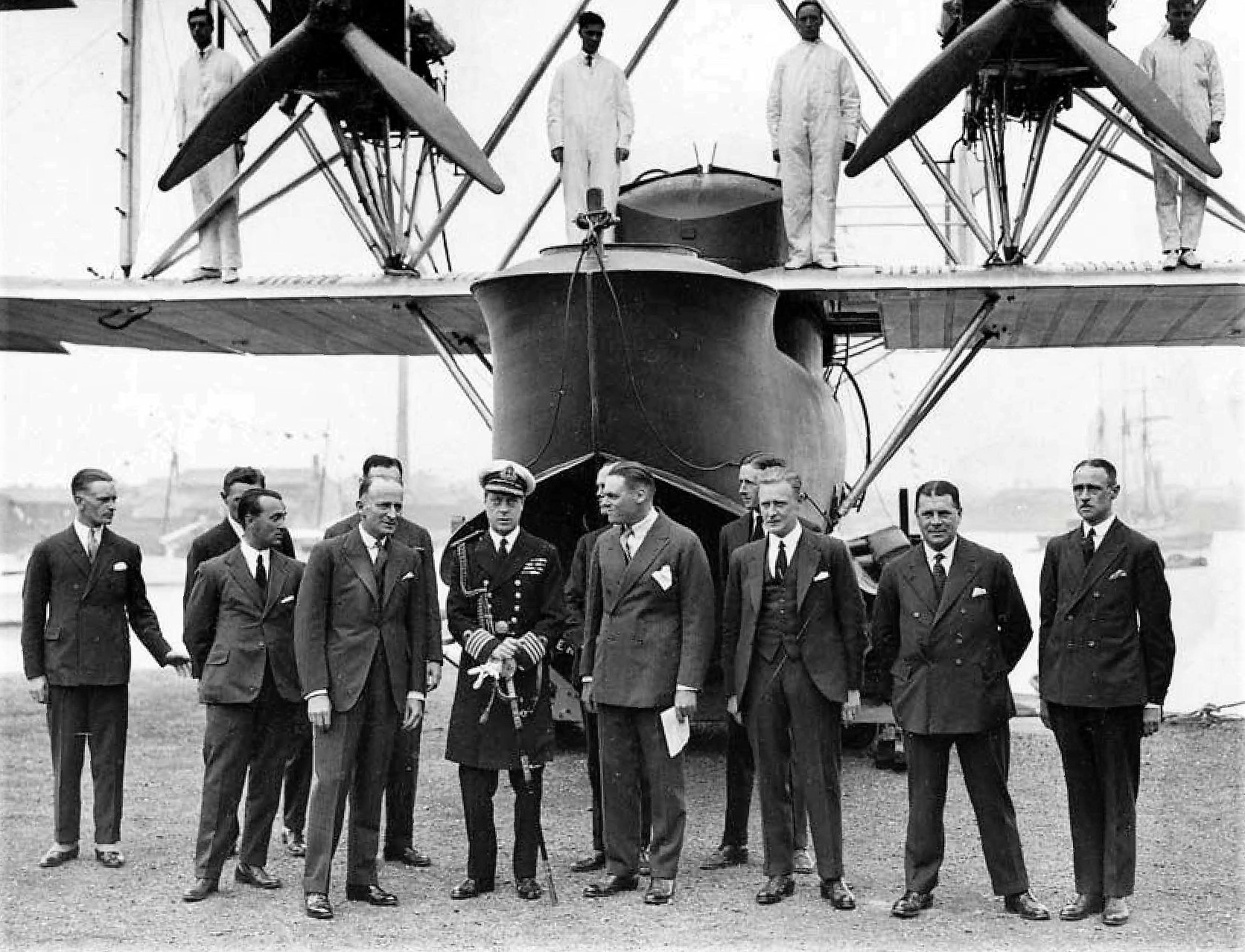
Supermarine Works staff stand with the Prince of Wales in front of the Swan during his visit to Southampton in June 1924. The aircraft's designer, R J Mitchell, is third from the right.

Completed as an aerial reconnaissance flying boat, the Swan was first flown under its serial number N175 by Supermarine's test pilot Henri Biard on 25 March 1924. It first flew with its more powerful engine and no undercarriage on 25 June 1924; the modifications assisted in increasing its maximum speed from 92 to 105 miles per hour (148 to 169 km/h). The Swan was the main exhibit seen by the Prince of Wales at the Supermarine works during his visit to Southampton on 27 June 1924.

The Swan was powered by two 350 horsepower (260 kW) Rolls-Royce Eagle IX engines. Used as an experimental aircraft, it lacked armaments and windows. A special mechanism connected to the gearbox allowed the pilot to retract the wheels rather than manually, as had been done before—a modification that was required because of the increased weight of the wheels.

The Swan was sent to be tested by the Marine Aircraft Experimental Establishment (MAEE), the Air Ministry's testing facility at RAF Felixstowe. Mitchell re-engined it with two 450 hp (340 kW) Napier Lion engines and had the landing gear removed for the tests, which took place in August 1924. It received satisfactory test results, and Supermarine was awarded with a production order for the aircraft. For the Mark II version of the Swan, produced in February 1926, the crew were relocated to where the baggage had previously been stored, the nose was redesigned to reduce aerodynamic drag, and the wings were altered to become fixed.

Mitchell proposed modifications of the Swan's design to include the incorporation of gun turrets, a machine gun in the bows, and bomb holders under the wings. His proposals were not taken up until the development of the Supermarine Southampton, the successor of the Swan. (Note: Impressed by the Swan's performance at Felixstowe, the Air Ministry generated Specification R.18/24 and ordered six Southamptons from Supermarine. This order was directly from the drawing board, an unusual arrangement that showed the confidence the British Government had in Mitchell's design.)

== Operational history as a commercial aircraft ==
External videos
- "Southampton to Guernsey", a Pathé News film of a flight by the Swan across the English Channel

In 1926, the Swan was registered as G-EBJY, having been converted for use as a passenger carrier. It first flew using its new registration on 9 June that year. It was loaned under contract to Imperial Airways as an amphibious flying boat to supplement the Supermarine Sea Eagles already flying from Southampton to Deauville and Le Touquet. The Swan was returned to the Air Ministry on 8 March the following year. The accommodation was modified by Supermarine to allow for 10 passengers, instead of the original 12. The 6 feet 6 inches (1.98 m) wide hull allowed for increased passenger comfort.

Little information is available about the operational history of the Swan after its registration was awarded in Aug 1924. The aircraft was scrapped in the autumn of 1928.

== Operators ==
United Kingdom

- Royal Air Force
  - Marine Aircraft Experimental Establishment, Felixstowe
- Imperial Airways

== Specifications ==
Data from . Supermarine Aircraft since 1914, Flight

General characteristics

- Crew: 2
- Capacity: 10 passengers, or 2,982 lb (1,352 kg) of cargo
- Length: 48 ft 6 in (14.78 m)
- Wingspan: 68 ft 8 in (20.93 m)
- Height: 18 ft 3 in (5.57 m)
- Wing area: 1,266 sq ft (117.6 m^{2})
- Empty weight: 10,114 lb (4,588 kg)
- Gross weight: 13,710 lb (6,219 kg)
- Powerplant: 2 × Napier Lion IIB inline piston engines, 450 hp (340 kW) each

Performance

- Maximum speed: 109 mph (175 km/h, 94 kn)
- Cruise speed: 92 mph (148 km/h, 80 kn)
- Stall speed: 45 mph (72 km/h, 39 kn)
- Range: 300 mi (480 km, 260 nmi)
- Service ceiling: 10,200 ft (3,110 m)
- Rate of climb: 510 ft/min (2.6 m/s)
- Wing loading: 10.78 lb/sq ft (52.6 kg/m^{2})

== See also ==
Related development

- Supermarine Scylla
- Supermarine Southampton

Aircraft of comparable role, configuration, and era

- Felixstowe F.5
- English Electric Kingston
- Hiro H1H
- Naval Aircraft Factory PN

== Sources ==
- Andrews, Charles Ferdinand; Morgan, Eric B. (1981). Supermarine Aircraft since 1914. London: Putnam. ISBN 978-03701-0-018-0.
- Hillman, Jo; Higgs, Colin (2020). Supermarine Southampton: The Flying Boat that Made R.J. Mitchell. Barnsley, UK: Pen & Sword Books Limited. ISBN 978-15267-8-497-1.
- Pegram, Ralph (2016). Beyond the Spitfire – The Unseen Designs of R.J. Mitchell (Hardback). Brimscombe Port: The History Press. ISBN 978-0-75096-515-6.
- Simmonds, O.E. (25 March 1926). "Details of Civil Marine Aircraft". Flight. Vol. 18, no. 900. ISSN 0015-3710 – via Internet Archive.
