= Hiro H2H =

Japanese flying boat

- H2H1 on a launching trolly.

General information
- Type: Patrol Flying boat
- National origin: Japan
- Manufacturer: Hiro Naval Arsenal
- Primary user: Imperial Japanese Navy
- Number built: 17

History
- Introduction date: 1932
- First flight: 1930
- Developed from: Supermarine Southampton

The Hiro H2H, or "Navy Type 89 Flying Boat" (Japanese: "八九式飛行艇"), was a Japanese patrol flying boat of the 1930s. Designed and built by the Hiro Naval Arsenal, it was a twin-engined biplane that was operated by the Imperial Japanese Navy.

== Design and development ==
In 1929, the Imperial Japanese Navy purchased a single example of the British Supermarine Southampton II metal-hulled flying boat, and, after evaluation, it was passed on to the Hiro Naval Arsenal (who designed the wooden Hiro H1H flying boat based on the Felixstowe F.5) to study its advanced metal hull structure. Following this study, Hiro designed a new flying boat, closely resembling the Southampton.

The new aircraft was a twin-engined biplane, with an all-metal hull and fabric covered metal wing and tail structures. It was powered by two Hiro Type 14 water-cooled 12-cylinders W engines. The first prototype was completed in 1930 and ordered into production following successful testing, with thirteen aircraft being built by Hiro and a further four by Aichi. Later aircraft were powered by more powerful (600-750 hp (448-560 kW)) Hiro Type 90 engines.

== Operational history ==
It entered service in 1932 as the Type 89 Flying Boat with the short designation H2H1. Type 89 Flying Boats entered service in time for the Shanghai Incident and, along with Hiro's earlier H1H, served in front-line service until the early years of the Second Sino-Japanese War.

== Specifications (Early version) ==
Data from Japanese Aircraft 1910-1941

General characteristics

- Crew: 6
- Length: 16.28 m (53 ft 5 in)
- Wingspan: 22.14 m (72 ft 8 in)
- Height: 6.13 m (20 ft 1 in)
- Wing area: 120.5 m^{2} (1,297 sq ft)
- Empty weight: 4,368 kg (9,630 lb)
- Gross weight: 6,500 kg (14,330 lb)
- Powerplant: 2 × Hiro Type 14 12-cylinder water-cooled W engine, 410 kW (550 hp) each
- Propellers: 4-bladed wooden propellers

Performance

- Maximum speed: 191.9 km/h (119.2 mph, 103.6 kn)
- Cruise speed: 130 km/h (81 mph, 70 kn) at 1,000 m (3,300 ft)
- Endurance: 14.5 hr
- Service ceiling: 4,320 m (14,170 ft)
- Time to altitude: 19 min to 3,000 m (9,800 ft)

Armament

- Guns: 4× 7.7 mm machine guns (two in bow, one each in port and starboard mid-ships stations)
- Bombs: Two 250 kg (550 lb) bombs

== See also ==
Related development

- Hiro H1H
- Supermarine Southampton

Aircraft of comparable role, configuration, and era

- Naval Aircraft Factory PN
- Saunders A.14
- Supermarine Scapa
- Hall PH

Related lists

- List of military aircraft of Japan
- List of seaplanes and flying boats
