= Hall PH =

PH
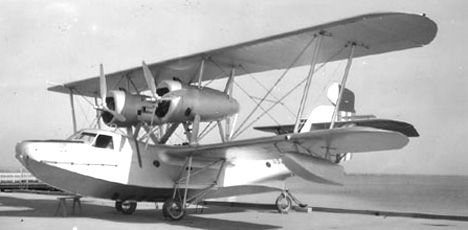
- Hall PH-3

General information
- Type: Patrol Flying Boat
- Manufacturer: Hall Aluminum Aircraft Corporation
- Primary users: United States Coast Guard United States Navy
- Number built: 24

History
- Introduction date: 1931
- First flight: 1929
- Retired: 1944
- Developed from: Naval Aircraft Factory PN

The Hall PH was an American flying boat of the 1930s. It was a twin-engined biplane, developed from the Naval Aircraft Factory PN and could hence trace its lineage back to the Felixstowe flying boats of World War I. The PH was purchased in small numbers by the United States Navy and the United States Coast Guard. It remained in service with the Coast Guard until 1944, being used for anti-submarine and search and rescue duties.

== Development and design ==
In December 1927, the U.S. Navy placed a contract with the Hall Aluminum Aircraft Corporation of Bristol, Pennsylvania for a developed version of the Naval Aircraft Factory PN-11, which itself could trace a development history back to the Felixstowe F.5 flying boat of World War I. The resultant prototype, the XPH-1, first flew in December 1929.

The XPH-1 had identical wings and a similar metal hull to that of the PN-11, but was fitted with a large single fin and rudder. It was powered by two Wright Cyclone radial engines and accommodated its two pilots side by side in an open cockpit, with cockpits for gunners in the nose and behind the wings.

In 1930 the Navy ordered nine aircraft, designated the PH-1, which were fitted with more powerful engines and a partly enclosed cockpit for the pilots. The Coast Guard later ordered seven PH-2 aircraft, similar to the PH-1 but with armament removed, and seven PH-3 units with armament reinstated and a fully enclosed cockpit for the pilots.

== Operational history ==
Delivery of the PH-1 commenced in October 1931, equipping VP-8 from 1932, operating from the seaplane tender Wright and from bases at Pearl Harbor, Midway Atoll, and the Panama Canal Zone. It was replaced by the Consolidated PBY-1 Catalina in 1937.

Production of the PH recommenced in June 1936 to meet an order for seven PH-2s for the Coast Guard. These entered service from 1938, being the largest aircraft operated by the Coast Guard at that time. In 1939 the Coast Guard ordered an additional seven PH-3 aircraft; they entered service in 1941.

The Hall flying boats were used by the Coast Guard for search and rescue duties and were fitted with specialized equipment for this role. Following the Japanese attack on Pearl Harbor and the United States entry into World War II, the remaining PHs were painted in U.S Navy Sea Grey to replace the previous silver paint, armed, and used for anti-submarine patrols (particularly during the Operation Drumbeat U-boat attacks off the East coast of the United States in 1942) as well as continuing search and rescue operations. The Coast Guard continued operating the PH-2 and -3 until 1944.

== Variants ==
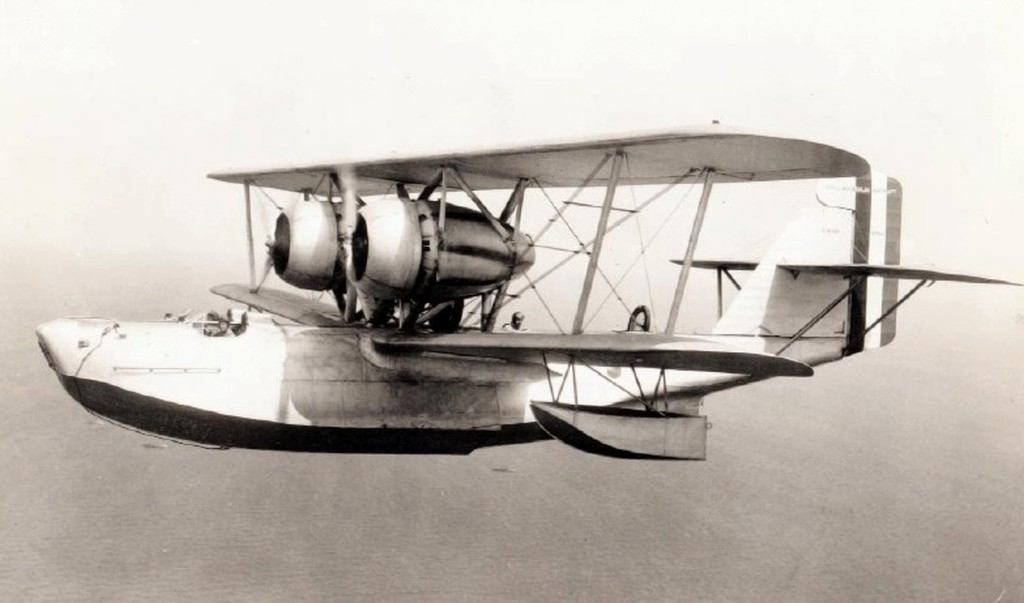
XPH-1 prototype in flight. Note the open pilots cockpit.

XPH-1
Prototype. Two 540 hp (400 kW) Wright R-1750 engines. One built.
PH-1
Production version for U.S. Navy. Partly enclosed cockpit for pilots. Two 620 hp (460 kW) Wright R-1820-86 engines in short-chord Townend ring cowlings. Nine built.
PH-2
Version for U.S Coast Guard. Two 750 hp (560 kW) Wright R-1820F-51 engines. Armament omitted. Seven built.
PH-3
Improved version for Coast Guard. Long Chord NACA cowlings. Revised enclosed canopy. Seven built.

== Operators ==
United States

- United States Coast Guard
- United States Navy

== Specifications (PH-3) ==
Data from United States Navy Aircraft since 1911

General characteristics

- Crew: six
- Length: 51 ft 0 in (15.54 m)
- Wingspan: 72 ft 10 in (22.20 m)
- Height: 19 ft 10 in (6.05 m)
- Wing area: 1,710 sq ft (158.9 m^{2})
- Empty weight: 9,614 lb (4,370 kg)
- Gross weight: 16,152 lb (7,342 kg)
- Powerplant: 2 × Wright R-1820F-51 Cyclone 9 cylinder air cooled radial engine, 750 hp (560 kW) each

Performance

- Maximum speed: 138 kn (159 mph, 256 km/h)
- Cruise speed: 118 kn (136 mph, 219 km/h)
- Range: 1,687 nmi (1,937 mi, 3,119 km)
- Service ceiling: 21,350 ft (9,700 m)
- Wing loading: 9.45 lb/sq ft (46.2 kg/m^{2})
- Power/mass: 0.093 hp/lb (0.15 kW/kg)

Armament

- Four flexibly mounted .303 (7.7 mm) in Lewis guns
- Up to 1,000 lb (454 kg) depth bombs

== See also ==
Related development

- Felixstowe F5L
- Naval Aircraft Factory PN
- Hall XP2H

Aircraft of comparable role, configuration, and era

- Hiro H1H
- Consolidated P2Y
- Hiro H2H
- Saro London
- Supermarine Scapa
- Supermarine Stranraer

Related lists

- List of aircraft of World War II
- List of United States Navy aircraft designations (pre-1962)
- List of seaplanes and flying boats
