= IAI ELI-3360 =

ELI-3360 is a business-jet based maritime patrol aircraft.

In February 2015, Elta Systems (a subsidiary of Israel Aerospace Industries) unveiled the ELI-3360, the first generation of armed, business-jet–based maritime patrol aircraft. Unlike smaller turboprop aircraft used in this role, the jet-powered business jet platforms are generally larger and more powerful, yet compact enough to operate from relatively short airstrips. The ELI-3360 program provides the mission system kit that adapts mid-size business jets (e.g. Gulfstream G280, Bombardier Challenger 650) and larger platforms (e.g. Bombardier Global 6500), to the maritime security and naval warfare missions, offering rapid deployment, reduced life-cycle costs, extended range, and long endurance.

All variants employ Elta’s Multi-Mission Management System to host interchangeable payloads that support various maritime missions. Standard equipment includes: ELM-2022 maritime patrol radar or its ELM-2025 C-Catcher AESA multi-mode radar for maritime, ground and aerial surveillance, capable of detecting targets from large warships to small speedboats;

- Electro-Optic/Infra-Red (EO/IR) turret for day/night imaging;
- Automatic Identification System (AIS) transceiver;
- Search and Rescue Direction Finder (SAR-DF).

Optional mission kits enable:

- Signals Intelligence (SIGINT)antennas and processing;
- Acoustic sensor suite for anti-submarine warfare;
- Weapon stations for lightweight torpedoes and air-to-surface missiles;
- Self-protection systems.

As of 2024, operators include maritime forces in Europe, Latin America, and the Asia-Pacific region. ---
