= Supermarine Nanok =

1920s British flying boat prototype

Nanok
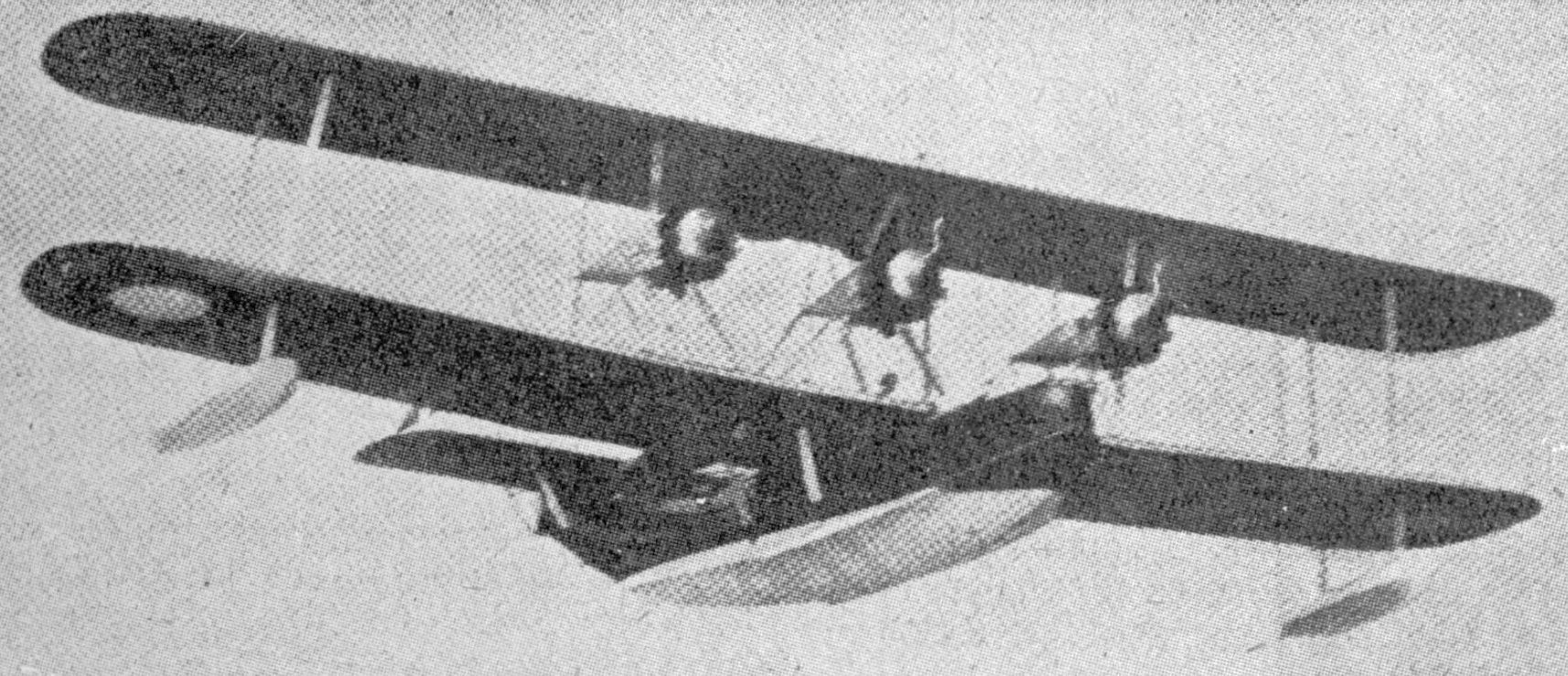

General information
- Other name: Solent
- Type: Patrol bomber flying boat
- National origin: United Kingdom
- Manufacturer: Supermarine
- Designer: R.J. Mitchell
- Number built: 1

History
- First flight: 21 June 1927
- Retired: 1934
- Developed from: Supermarine Southampton

The Supermarine Nanok was a British three-engined biplane flying boat built by Supermarine. Built to meet a Royal Danish Navy requirement, the single prototype was rebuilt as a private air yacht and renamed the Supermarine Solent.

== Development and design ==
The Nanok (Inuit language: "Polar bear") was a three-engined development of Supermarine's successful Southampton flying boat, designed to meet a Danish requirement for a torpedo-carrying flying boat. A prototype was ordered on 17 June 1926, and the aircraft first flew on 21 June 1927. Testing was disappointing, and despite modifications the aircraft could not meet the specified performance and was rejected by the Danes.

In 1928 the aircraft was renamed the Supermarine Solent, and offered for sale as a torpedo bomber, but failed to sell. It was therefore converted to a civilian 9 seater air yacht for the brewing magnate Ernest Guinness. This was registered as G-AAAB in August 1928. Guinness may have found the interior headroom of the hull too small, as he almost immediately ordered its replacement, the all-metal Supermarine Air Yacht. The Solent was deregistered and scrapped in 1934.

The name 'Supermarine Solent' was also applied to a separate aircraft design, using the Supermarine Southampton hull with the Nanok's larger wings, as a 14-seat civil transport. This design failed to sell though.

== Operational history ==
The Solent was certified as airworthy on 5 September 1928, and was used to fly frequently between England and the owner's home near Lough Corrib in County Galway, Ireland. It remained in use until it was scrapped in 1934.

== Operators ==
Denmark

- Royal Danish Navy

== Specifications (Nanok) ==
Data from Supermarine Aircraft since 1914

General characteristics

- Crew: 5
- Length: 50 ft 6 in (15.39 m)
- Wingspan: 75 ft 0 in (22.86 m)
- Height: 19 ft 6 in (5.94 m)
- Wing area: 1,572 sq ft (146.0 m^{2})
- Empty weight: 10,619 lb (4,817 kg)
- Gross weight: 16,311 lb (7,399 kg)
- Powerplant: 3 × Armstrong Siddeley Jaguar IV 14-cylinder air-cooled radial piston engines, 430 hp (320 kW) each
- Propellers: 2-bladed wooden fixed-pitch propellers, 10 ft 0 in (3.05 m) diameter

Performance

- Maximum speed: 113.5 mph (182.7 km/h, 98.6 kn) at sea level

101.2 mph (88 kn; 163 km/h) at 10,000 ft (3,048 m)

- Stall speed: 64 mph (103 km/h, 56 kn)
- Range: 640 mi (1,030 km, 560 nmi) for reconnaissance missions
- Combat range: 240 mi (390 km, 210 nmi)
- Service ceiling: 10,920 ft (3,330 m)
- Rate of climb: 607 ft/min (3.08 m/s)
- Time to altitude:

- 5,000 ft (1,524 m) in 10 minutes 20 seconds
- 10,000 ft (3,048 m) in 31 minutes

- Wing loading: 10.4 lb/sq ft (51 kg/m^{2})
- Power/mass: 0.079 hp/lb (0.130 kW/kg)

Armament

- Guns: 2 × .303 in (7.7 mm) machine guns (one in bow and one amidships)
- Bombs: 2 × 1,534 lb (700 kg) torpedoes

== See also ==
Related development

- Supermarine Southampton

Related lists

- List of flying boats and floatplanes

== Sources ==
- Andrews, Charles Ferdinand; Morgan, Eric B. (1987). Supermarine Aircraft since 1914. London: Putnam. ISBN 978-0-85177-800-6.
- Jackson, A.J. (1988). British Civil Aircraft 1919–1972. Vol. 3. London: Putnam. ISBN 978-0-85177-818-1.
- Pegram, Ralph (2016). Beyond the Spitfire: The Unseen Designs of R.J. Mitchell. Pegram: The History Press. ISBN 978-0-7509-6515-6.
