= Short Rangoon =

British three-engined biplane flying boat

S.8/8 Rangoon
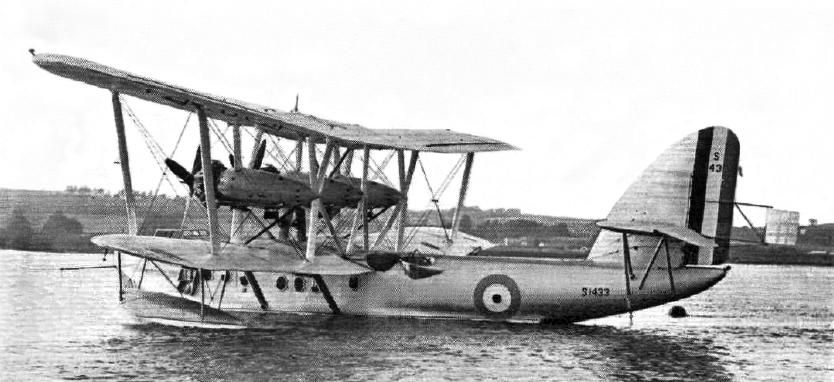

General information
- Type: Flying Boat
- Manufacturer: Short Brothers
- Primary user: Royal Air Force
- Number built: 6

History
- Introduction date: 1931
- First flight: 24 September 1930
- Retired: 1935
- Developed from: Short S.8 Calcutta
- Variant: Kawanishi H3K

The Short S.8/8 Rangoon was a 1930s British three-engined biplane flying boat, designed and built by Short Brothers for the Royal Air Force.

== Background ==
In 1929, the Royal Air Force needed urgent replacements of the Supermarine Southampton IIs then operated by No. 203 Squadron RAF based at Basra, Iraq. The Air Ministry issued Specification S.18/29 to specifically cover the procurement of a military variant of the Short S.8 Calcutta, similar to the S.8/2 Calcutta then being designed in collaboration with Breguet for Aviation Navale (French Naval Aviation). The new RAF version had Shorts designation S.8/8 and RAF designation Rangoon, and three examples were initially ordered.

== Design and development ==
The Rangoon was a straightforward military adaption of the Calcutta. The main structure was assembled from duralumin formers, spars, ribs and stringers; the fuselage was skinned with duralumin, and the flying surfaces were partly skinned and partly fabric-covered. The major changes were the provision of an enclosed cockpit for the pilots, rest bunks, enlarged fuel tanks in the upper wing, three Lewis guns (one mounted forward of the cockpit, and two in the fuselage behind the wings), underwing bomb racks, and a large fresh water tank (for intended use in tropical conditions).

== Operational history ==
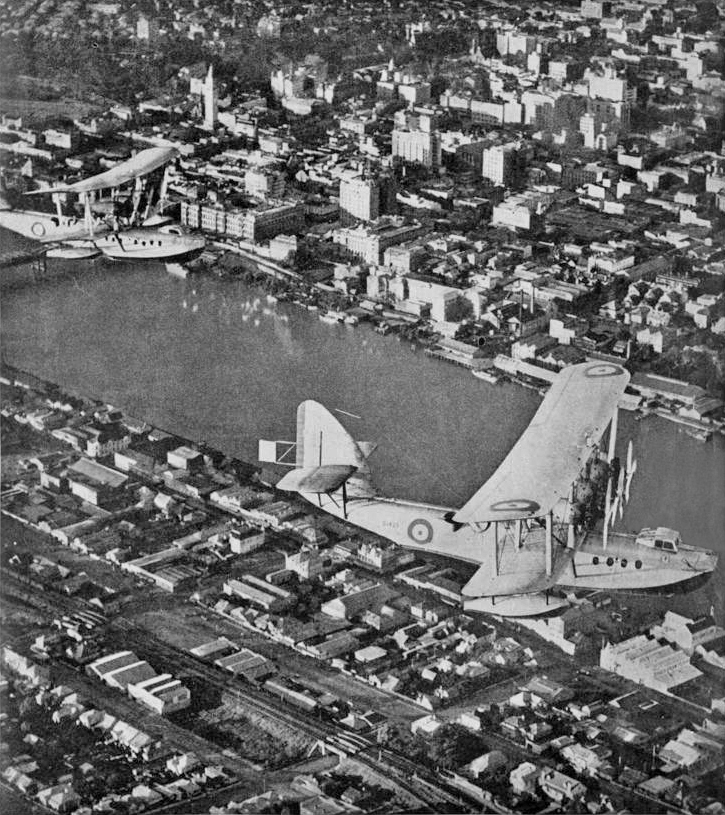
The lead aircraft of three Rangoons over Brisbane River, 1934

On 24 September 1930, the first Rangoon (S1433) was flown from the River Medway at Rochester by Shorts' Chief Test Pilot, John Lankester Parker. In early 1931, the first three Rangoons were delivered to the RAF for training at Felixstowe, then in April 1931 they were flown in formation to No. 203 Squadron RAF at Basra. They were used for surveying and anti-smuggling patrols over Iraq and the Persian Gulf. Over the following three years, three more Rangoons (built to a higher specification R.19/31) were delivered to No. 203 Squadron at Basra, where they served without problem until 1935, when they were replaced by Short Singapore IIIs.

In September and October 1934, three Rangoons of No. 203 Squadron visited Australia as part of the celebrations of the centenary of the state of Victoria and of the centenary of Melbourne.

In August 1935, five Rangoons were transferred to No. 210 Squadron RAF at Pembroke Dock. In September 1935, they were temporarily deployed to Gibraltar during the Abyssinia Crisis, and all were retired from service at the end of 1935. Meanwhile, the first Rangoon (S1433) was stripped of military equipment by Shorts at Rochester, registered G-AEIM, then used by Air Pilots Training Ltd for training crews of Imperial Airways at Hamble, until it was retired in late 1938.

== Operators ==
United Kingdom

- Royal Air Force
  - No. 203 Squadron RAF
  - No. 210 Squadron RAF
- Air Pilots Training Ltd

Japan

- Dai-Nippon Teikoku Kaigun Koukuu-tai (Kawanishi H3K variant)

== Specifications (S.8/8 Rangoon) ==
Data from Aircraft of the Royal Air Force 1918–57

General characteristics

- Crew: 5
- Length: 66 ft 9 1/2 in (20.358 m)
- Wingspan: 93 ft 0 in (28.35 m)
- Height: 23 ft 9 in (7.24 m)
- Wing area: 1,828 sq ft (169.8 m^{2})
- Empty weight: 14,000 lb (6,350 kg)
- Gross weight: 22,500 lb (10,206 kg)
- Powerplant: 3 × Bristol Jupiter XIF 9-cylinder air-cooled radial engine, 540 hp (400 kW) each

Performance

- Maximum speed: 115 mph (185 km/h, 100 kn)
- Cruise speed: 92 mph (148 km/h, 80 kn)
- Range: 650 mi (1,050 km, 560 nmi)
- Endurance: 7 hr at 92 mph (80 kn; 148 km/h)
- Service ceiling: 12,000 ft (3,700 m)
- Rate of climb: 550 ft/min (2.8 m/s)

Armament

- Guns: Three 0.303 in Lewis guns
- Bombs: Up to 1,000 lb (455 kg)

== See also ==
Related development

- Short Singapore
- Short S.8 Calcutta
- Kawanishi H3K-2/Short KF.1
- Breguet Br.521 Bizerte, Br.522 and Br.530 Saigon

Related lists

- List of flying boats and floatplanes

== Bibliography ==
- Barnes, C. H.; James, D. N. (1989). Shorts Aircraft since 1900. Putnam. ISBN 0-85177-819-4.
- Thetford, Owen (1957). Aircraft of the Royal Air Force 1918-57 (1st ed.). Putnam.
