= Supermarine Scylla =

1920s British flying boat

Scylla

General information
- Type: Flying boat
- Manufacturer: Supermarine
- Designer: R. J. Mitchell
- Status: Prototype
- Primary user: Royal Air Force
- Number built: 1

The Supermarine Scylla was a 1920s British biplane flying boat built by Supermarine.

== Design and development ==
The Scylla was designed by R. J. Mitchell, chief designer at Supermarine as an experimental wooden twin-engined biplane amphibian aircraft, in parallel with the Supermarine Swan design for a replacement for the Royal Air Force's Felixstowe F5.

== Operators ==
United Kingdom

- Royal Air Force
  - Marine Aircraft Experimental Establishment, Felixstowe

== See also ==
- Felixstowe F5

Related development

- Supermarine Swan

Related lists

- Seaplanes and flying boats
