= Kawanishi H3K =

Japanese maritime patrol flying boat

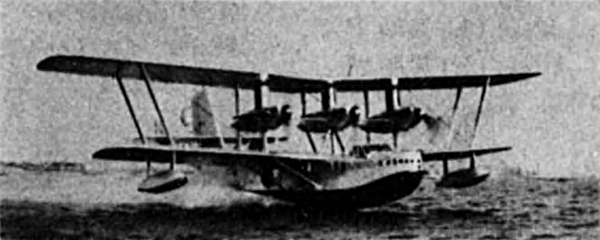

General information
- Type: Maritime patrol flying boat
- Manufacturer: Kawanishi Aircraft Company
- Primary user: Imperial Japanese Navy Air Service
- Number built: 5

History
- First flight: 10 October 1930
- Retired: 1936
- Developed from: Short Rangoon

The Kawanishi H3K, also known as Navy Type 90-2 Flying Boat (九〇式二号飛行艇), was a Japanese biplane military flying boat from the interwar period. The H3K was a development of the Short S.8/8 Rangoon. The first of the H3Ks was built by Short Brothers and the remaining four by Kawanishi in Japan.

== Design and development ==
In 1929, the Imperial Japanese Navy tasked Kawanishi with acquiring a new long-range reconnaissance flying boat. Kawanishi sent a team to the British aircraft manufacturer Short Brothers in order to inspect Short's designs and procure a suitable type to meet the Japanese Navy's needs. After inspecting the Singapore Mk.I and the Short S.8/8 Rangoon, itself a military adaptation of the Short Calcutta, Kawanishi chose an enlarged development of the Rangoon, with Rolls-Royce Buzzard engines replacing the Bristol Jupiters of the Rangoon.

Short's design, the S.15 K.F.1 was a large all-metal biplane, with three Buzzard engines mounted between the wings in streamlined nacelles with promiminent radiators above the engines. It had two separate, side-by-side cockpits for the two pilots, with gunners stations in the nose, two dorsal positions and the tail, with the flight engineer and radio operator working within the hull, which also contained a galley wardroom, and sleeping accommodation for a crew of eight.

The prototype K.F.1. first flew on 10 October 1930, and after brief trials was dismantled and sent to Japan by ship. When re-assembled in Japan, testing showed it to have good performance, and as a result, Kawanishi negotiated a license for production of the K.F.1, with the first Japanese built aircraft completed in March 1931. Four aircraft were built in Japan with the final one completed in February 1933, differing from the prototype by being fitted with an enclosed cockpit for the pilots and modified bow cockpits.

== Operational history ==
The type was formally accepted into service by the Japanese Navy in October 1932, as the Navy Type 90-2 Flying Boat (short designation H3K1). They were used for long distance patrol and training missions over the Pacific, remaining in service until the end of 1936.

On 8 January 1933, one of the H3Ks crashed while alighting at night at Tateyama on a training flight. The cause given was a slow-reading altimeter. Noted naval aviator Lt. Cmdr. Shinzo Shin was killed, as were two more of the nine-member crew.

== Operators ==
Japan

- Imperial Japanese Navy Air Service

== Specifications (H3K) ==
Data from Japanese Aircraft, 1910-1941

General characteristics

- Crew: six to nine
- Length: 22.55 m (74 ft 0 in)
- Wingspan: 31.05 m (101 ft 10 in)
- Height: 8.77 m (28 ft 9 in)
- Wing area: 214 m^{2} (2,300 sq ft)
- Empty weight: 10,030 kg (22,112 lb)
- Gross weight: 15,000 kg (33,069 lb)
- Powerplant: 3 × Rolls-Royce Buzzard water-cooled V12 engines, 712 kW (955 hp) each
- Propellers: 2-bladed metal propeller

Performance

- Maximum speed: 226 km/h (140 mph, 122 kn)
- Cruise speed: 169 km/h (105 mph, 91 kn)
- Endurance: 9 hr
- Service ceiling: 4,040 m (13,250 ft)
- Time to altitude: 19 min 40 s to 3,000 m (9,840 ft)

Armament

- Guns: 8 x 7.7 mm machine guns (twin mountings in nose, two dorsal and tail positions)
- Bombs: Up to 1,000 kg of bombs

== See also ==
Related development

- Short Cromarty
- Short S.2
- Short Singapore
- Short Calcutta
- Short Rangoon
- Kawanishi H6K

Related lists

- List of seaplanes and flying boats
