= Gotha WD.27 =

WD.27
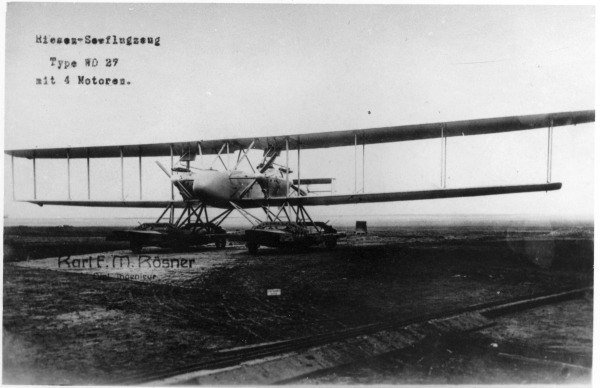

General information
- Type: Long-range maritime patrol aircraft
- National origin: Germany
- Manufacturer: Gothaer Waggonfabrik
- Designer: Karl Rösner
- Number built: 1–3 prototypes

The Gotha WD.27 (for (Wasser Doppeldecker - "Water Biplane")) was a long-range maritime patrol floatplane developed during World War I by Gothaer Waggonfabrik (Gotha) for the Imperial German Navy's (Kaiserliche Marine) Naval Air Service (Marine-Fliegerabteilung). It was a large, four-engine aircraft with the same general layout as the WD.22; a conventional floatplane with engines grouped in tractor-pusher pairs on the lower wings. Three aircraft were ordered in early 1918, but the first prototype was not completed until after the end of the war in November. It may not have flown before it was ordered to be destroyed by the victorious Allies.

== Background and description ==
By late 1916, the vulnerability of the Zeppelins on reconnaissance missions over the North Sea had been recognized by the Naval Air Service and Rear Admiral (Konteradmiral) Otto Philipp, commander of the Naval Air Service, outlined requirements for three types of multi-engine seaplanes to replace the Zeppelins. The highest priority was for a four-engine maritime patrol aircraft with an endurance of 10–12 hours, capable of maintaining altitude on two engines, in a memorandum on 26 December. Philipp clarified on 10 February 1917 that the reconnaissance aircraft's tasks would be mine spotting, anti-submarine duties, and shipping control. The Naval Air Service placed an order for three improved versions of the WD.22 in 1918 to compare them with the very large floatplanes like the Zeppelin-Staaken L.

Designed by Karl Rösner, the WD.27 was a four-bay biplane with a wooden fuselage. In the nose of the aircraft was the forward gunner's position; behind it was the cockpit for the pilot and copilot. In the middle of the fuselage was the Wireless compartment which was equipped with a dorsal machine gun position. The wooden wings were hinged outboard of the engine nacelles and could be folded to the rear, which reduced the width of the aircraft to 10.5 metres (34 ft 5 in). The biplane tail structure was built from steel tubing. The tail structure consisted of two each horizontal stabilizers and vertical stabilizers fitted with two rudders forming a box shape. The two floats were connected by multiple struts to both the lower wing and the fuselage.

The four straight-six, 175-horsepower (130 kW) Mercedes D.IIIa engines were mounted back-to-back in two streamlined nacelles located on the lower wing. Each nacelle was provided with a radiator suspended from the upper wing above it. Piping connected the radiator to each engine in the nacelle. The WD.27 could be fitted with a drop tank underneath the fuselage; the total fuel capacity with internal and external tanks was 1,790 litres (390 imp gal; 470 US gal).

== History ==
The first prototype was ready for factory engine tests in December 1918 and was reportedly compete the following month. It is not known if it ever flew or what the status was of the other two prototypes. Gotha's plans to convert the aircraft into an airliner or cargo aircraft were thwarted by the Allies who ordered its destruction.

== Specifications ==
Data from Gotha Aircraft of WWI: A Centennial Perspective on Great War Airplanes; German Aircraft of the First World War; Marine Aircraft of the 1914–1918 War

General characteristics

- Crew: 4
- Length: 17.6 m (57 ft 9 in)
- Upper wingspan: 34 m (111 ft 7 in)
- Lower wingspan: 31 m (101 ft 8 in)
- Height: 6 m (19 ft 8 in)
- Wing area: 197 m^{2} (2,120 sq ft)
- Empty weight: 4,700 kg (10,362 lb)
- Gross weight: 6,860 kg (15,124 lb)
- Powerplant: 4 × Mercedes D.IIIa water-cooled straight-six engines, 130 kW (175 hp) each
- Propellers: 2-bladed

Performance

- Maximum speed: 135 km/h (84 mph, 73 kn)
- Range: 1,110 km (690 mi, 600 nmi)
- Time to altitude: 15 minutes to 1,000 m (3,300 ft)

Armament

- Guns: 2 x machine guns

== Bibliography ==
- Andersson, Lennart & Sanger, Ray (2014). Retribution and Recovery: German Aircraft and Aviation 1919 to 1922. Staplefield, UK: Air-Britain (Historians). ISBN 978-0-85130-467-0.
- Gray, Peter & Thetford, Owen (1987) [1970]. German Aircraft of the First World War (2nd ed.). London: Putnam. ISBN 0-85177-809-7.
- Haddow, George William & Grosz, Peter Michael (1988) [1962]. The German Giants: The German R-Planes 1914 – 1918 (3rd ed.). London: Putnam. ISBN 0-85177-812-7.
- Herris, Jack (2013). Gotha Aircraft of WWI: A Centennial Perspective on Great War Airplanes. Great War Aviation Centennial Series. Vol. 6. Charleston, South Carolina: Aeronaut Books. ISBN 978-1-935881-14-8.
- Metzmacher, Andreas (2021). Gotha Aircraft 1913–1954: From the London Bomber to the Flying Wing Jet Fighter. Brimscombe, UK: Fonthill. ISBN 978-1-78155-706-8.
- Nowarra, Heinz J.; Robertson, Bruce & Cooksley, Peter G. (1966). Marine Aircraft of the 1914–1918 War. Letchworth, UK: Harleyford Publications. OCLC 123198808.
