= RAF Sullom Voe =

Disused RAF base in Shetland, Scotland

RAF Sullom Voe
- Sullom Voe, Shetland Isles in Scotland

Site information
- Type: Satellite Station
- Owner: Air Ministry
- Operator: Royal Air Force
- Controlled by: RAF Coastal Command

Location
- Shown within Shetland RAF Sullom Voe (the United Kingdom)
- Coordinates: 60°28′00″N 001°16′30″W

Site history
- Built: 1938
- In use: 1938-1952
- Battles/wars: European theatre of World War II

Airfield information
- Elevation: 1 metre (3 ft 3 in) AMSL
- Other: Aligned with RAF Scatsta

Royal Air Force Sullom Voe or more simply RAF Sullom Voe is a former Royal Air Force station near the village of Brae, in the Shetland Isles of Scotland. It was a Flying boat base and was closely associated with the adjacent airfield of RAF Scatsta.

== History ==
=== Beginnings ===
The building of this flying boat station started well before the Second World War during 1938 and it became home to various Coastal Command squadrons that patrolled the North Sea, Norwegian Sea and North Atlantic for enemy ships and U-boats.

In the early days accommodation was provided by the Clyde-built SS Manella, a ship built in 1921, requisitioned by the Royal Navy in 1939, renamed HMS Manella and sent to Sullom Voe as a supply ship to provide temporary accommodation prior to suitable accommodation being built on-shore at nearby Graven.

201 Squadron was posted there just 25 days before the declaration of war on 3 September 1939. 240 Squadron was posted there a month later on 4 November 1939 then Sullom Voe became the first location in the British Isles to be bombed on Monday 13 November 1939 when four bombs landed in a field. No damage was formally reported apart from the death of a rabbit!

The complex was added to when a nearby airfield was built during 1940 and named RAF Scatsta.

=== Units ===
Squadron	Aircraft	Posted from	Posted to	From → To	Notes
190	Consolidated Catalina IB & IV	17 February 1943	1 January 1944	Formed → Disbanded	Formed from the nucleus of disbanded 210 Squadron and subsequently reformed back to 210 Sqn again.
201	Saro London I & II; Short Sunderland I & II	9 August 1939; 26 May 1940	6 November 1939; 9 October 1941	RAF Calshot → RAF Invergordon; RAF Invergordon → RAF Lough Erne	Squadron moves twice to Sullom Voe.
204	Short Sunderland I	2 April 1940	5 April 1941	RAF Mount Batten → RAF Reykjavik	
210	Short Sunderland I	24 November 1939; 13 July 1940	21 May 1940; 4 October 1942	RAF Invergordon → RAF Pembroke Dock; RAF Oban → RAF Pembroke Dock	Detachment from RAF Invergordon then from RAF Oban.
240	Saro London II	4 November 1939; 27 March 1940	12 February 1940; 27 May 1940	RAF Invergordon → RAF Invergordon; RAF Invergordon → RAF Pembroke Dock	Squadron moves twice to Sullom Voe.
330	Short Sunderland II, III and V	12 July 1943	14 June 1945	RAF Oban → Stavangar Airport, Sola, Norway	Squadron disbanded 21 Nov 1945 and transferred to Norwegian control.
333	Consolidated Catalina I & IV	5 May 1943	June 1945	RAF Woodhaven → Fornebu (Oslo, Norway)	On detachment before being disbanded 21 November 1945 and transferred to Norwegian control.
413 RCAF	Consolidated Catalina I & IV	1 October 1941	4 March 1942	RAF Stranraer → En route to Sri Lanka	
461 RAAF					
701 Naval Air Squadron					

The following units were also here at some point:

- No. 2733 Squadron RAF Regiment
- No. 2751 Squadron RAF Regiment
- No. 2766 Squadron RAF Regiment
- No. 2778 Squadron RAF Regiment
- No. 2782 Squadron RAF Regiment

=== During the Second World War ===
In 1944 one of 210 Sqn's pilots, Flying Officer John Cruickshank, carried out a successful attack off Narvik on a German U-boat, sinking the U-361, which by this time possessed heavy anti-aircraft guns. Despite severe injuries from those guns, he managed to fly his aircraft home and circled until daybreak before he was able to land it safely saving his crew, an achievement for which he was awarded the Victoria Cross.

=== Post War ===
RAF Sullom Voe and RAF Scatsta was rendered non-operational in June 1945 after all wartime operations by Coastal Command ended.

In 1975 the Sullom Voe Terminal was built in the land and surroundings formerly part of the airbase and its sister airport RAF Scatsta.

Major portions of the airfield still remain. Some have been repurposed; such as taxiways being used as car parking.
