= Blackburn Iris =

British three-engined biplane flying boat

Iris
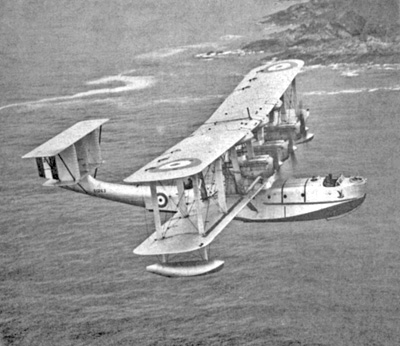
- The Blackburn Iris Mk III S1263

General information
- Type: Flying Boat
- National origin: United Kingdom
- Manufacturer: Blackburn Aircraft
- Designer: John Douglas Rennie
- Primary user: Royal Air Force
- Number built: 5

History
- Introduction date: 1929
- First flight: 18 June 1926
- Retired: 1934
- Variant: Blackburn Perth

The Blackburn Iris was a British three-engined biplane flying boat of the 1920s. Although only five Irises were built, it was used as a long-range maritime reconnaissance aircraft by the Royal Air Force, where it equipped a squadron for four years, being used to carry out a number of notable long-distance flights. The final version of the Iris, the Iris Mark V was developed into the aircraft that replaced it in Squadron service, the Blackburn Perth.

== Development and design ==
In 1924, the British Air Ministry issued Specification R.14/24 for a long-range reconnaissance flying boat for the Royal Air Force. To meet this requirement, Blackburn Aircraft proposed the R.B.1 (Reconnaissance Biplane 1), designed by Major John Douglas Rennie, who as Chief Technical Officer worked with John Cyril Porte at the Seaplane Experimental Station, Felixstowe.

The R.B.1 was a three-engined, three-bay biplane. The equal-span wings were of mixed wood-and-metal construction, with ailerons fitted to both upper and lower wings and floats fitted under the wingtips, while the aircraft had a large biplane tail (with a span of 30 ft (9.14 m)) with three fins and rudders. The aircraft's hull had a wooden structure covered in plywood, with a V-bottom with two steps to give good water handling. Three 650 hp (485 kW) Rolls-Royce Condor III water-cooled V12 engines driving four-bladed propellers were mounted in individual nacelles between the wings. It carried a crew of five, with two pilots sitting side by side in a cockpit forward of the wings, with nose and dorsal gun positions mounting Lewis guns on Scarff rings, with provision for a further two guns which could be operated through portholes in the rear fuselage. Bomb racks under the wings could carry up to 1,040 lb (470 kg) of bombs.

The prototype R.B.1, with the designation Iris I, and with the serial number N185, made its maiden flight from Blackburn's factory at Brough on 19 June 1926, being delivered to the Marine Aircraft Experimental Establishment at Felixstowe the next day, being fully tested during July and August. Wooden hulls were prone to soaking up large quantities of water (which could amount to several hundred pounds in additional weight) when kept afloat for long periods of time, so Rennie designed an all-metal hull for the Iris, constructed of duralumin before the Iris first flew. N185 returned to Brough in March 1927 when it was fitted with the new metal hull, together with more powerful engines and an additional gunner's position in the tail, becoming the Iris II.

On 12 August 1927, shortly after being redelivered, the Iris II started, along with the prototype Short Singapore I, an experimental metal-hulled Supermarine Southampton, and the prototype wooden-hulled Saunders Valkyrie (a direct competitor to the Iris), a 3,000 mi (4,800 km) tour of Scandinavia and the Baltic. The Iris performed well on the tour, particularly compared to the Valkyrie, which suffered much heavier water soakage than expected as well as engine problems, and the Air Ministry issued Specification R.31/27 for an improved version of the Iris, to act as a long-range supplement to the smaller Southampton.

== Operational history ==
On 4 February 1928, a contract was placed for three Iris III aircraft, similar to the Iris II but with fabric-covered metal wings. The Iris II, meanwhile, continued in use, setting out on another long-range cruise on 27 September, carrying Sir Philip Sassoon, the Under-Secretary of State for Air and Air Commodore Sir Arthur Longmore on a tour of RAF Stations of the Mediterranean and Middle East. It reached Karachi on 14 October, finally returning to RAF Calshot on 14 November, having flown a total distance of 11,360 mi (18,290 km) with a flight time of 125 hr 5 min.

The first Iris III flew on 21 November 1929, with the three Iris IIIs equipping No. 209 Squadron which reformed at RAF Mount Batten, Plymouth in January 1930. 209 Squadron continued the pattern of long-range flights carried out by the Iris II, with one Iris visiting Reykjavík in June 1930 to celebrate the 1,000th anniversary of the Icelandic Althing (parliament), and another making the first crossing of the Bay of Biscay by flying boat when visiting Lisbon in August 1930.

The first Iris III was destroyed in a fatal crash on 4 February 1931, killing nine of twelve aboard, when the pilot misjudged a landing approach over a glassy-smooth Plymouth Sound. A replacement was ordered. Although still an Iris III, this had a number of changes, being fitted with provision to carry a COW 37 mm gun in its bow. The weight of the Iris had grown considerably since the Iris I, and it was decided to replace the Iris III's Condors with more powerful (825 hp (615 kW) Rolls-Royce Buzzard engines to restore performance and improve reliability, with the three re-engined aircraft re-entering service in 1932 as the Iris V. The Iris II was also re-engined, being fitted with three 800 hp Armstrong Siddeley Panther radial engines, with the centre engine in a pusher configuration to become the Iris IV.

An Iris III S1263 of 209 Squadron, Mount Batten, sank following collision with dockyard launch after landing in Plymouth Sound; 12 Jan 1933; of 9 airmen, 1 drowned and 7 injured

The Iris Vs were replaced in squadron service in 1934 by the Blackburn Perth, four very similar Buzzard-powered aircraft closely based on the Iris. One of the Iris Vs was converted for use as a testbed for the Napier Culverin, a licence-built Junkers Jumo 204 diesel engine, flying in this form in June 1937 and continuing flight trials until April 1938.

== Variants ==
R.B.1 / Iris I
Prototype, wooden hull and mixed construction wings, powered by three 650 hp (485 kW) Rolls-Royce Condor III engines. One built.
R.B.1A / Iris II
The Iris I with a new, all-metal hull and three 675 hp (503 kW) Rolls-Royce Condor IIIA inline piston engines.
R.B.1B / Iris III
Five-seat long-range maritime reconnaissance flying boat for the Royal Air Force. Metal hull and wings. Powered by three 675 hp (503 kW) Rolls-Royce Condor IIIB inline piston engines. Four built.
R.B.1C / Iris IV
Conversion of the Iris II with three 800 hp (600 kW) Armstrong Siddeley Leopard III radial piston engines.
R.B.1D / Iris V
This was the final variant. Three Iris Mk IIIs were fitted with 825 hp (615 kW) Rolls-Royce Buzzard IIMS piston engines.

== Operators ==
United Kingdom

- Royal Air Force
  - No. 209 Squadron RAF

== Specifications (Iris III) ==
Data from Aircraft of the Royal Air Force 1918–57

General characteristics

- Crew: 5
- Length: 67 ft 4.75 in (20.5423 m)
- Wingspan: 97 ft 0 in (29.57 m)
- Height: 25 ft 6 in (7.77 m)
- Wing area: 2,461 sq ft (228.6 m^{2})
- Empty weight: 19,301 lb (8,755 kg)
- Max takeoff weight: 29,489 lb (13,376 kg)
- Fuel capacity: 906 imp gal (1,088 US gal; 4,119 L) in 3 tanks above each engine
- Powerplant: 3 × Rolls-Royce Condor IIIB V-12 water-cooled piston engines, 675 hp (503 kW) each
- Propellers: 4-bladed fixed-pitch propellers

Performance

- Maximum speed: 118 mph (190 km/h, 103 kn)
- Endurance: 4 hours 54 minutes
- Service ceiling: 10,600 ft (3,200 m)
- Rate of climb: 630 ft/min (3.2 m/s)
- Wing loading: 11.8 lb/sq ft (58 kg/m^{2})
- Power/mass: 0.0699 hp/lb (0.1149 kW/kg)

Armament

- Guns: 3 × .303 in (7.7 mm) Lewis guns, 1 mounted forward and two aft in open cockpits
- Bombs: Up to 2,000 lb (910 kg) of bombs

== See also ==
Related development

- Felixstowe Fury
- Blackburn Sydney
- Blackburn Perth

Aircraft of comparable role, configuration, and era

- Saunders Valkyrie
- Short Sarafand

Related lists

- List of aircraft of the Royal Air Force
- List of flying boats and floatplanes
