= Short Sarafand =

British biplane flying boat

S.14 Sarafand
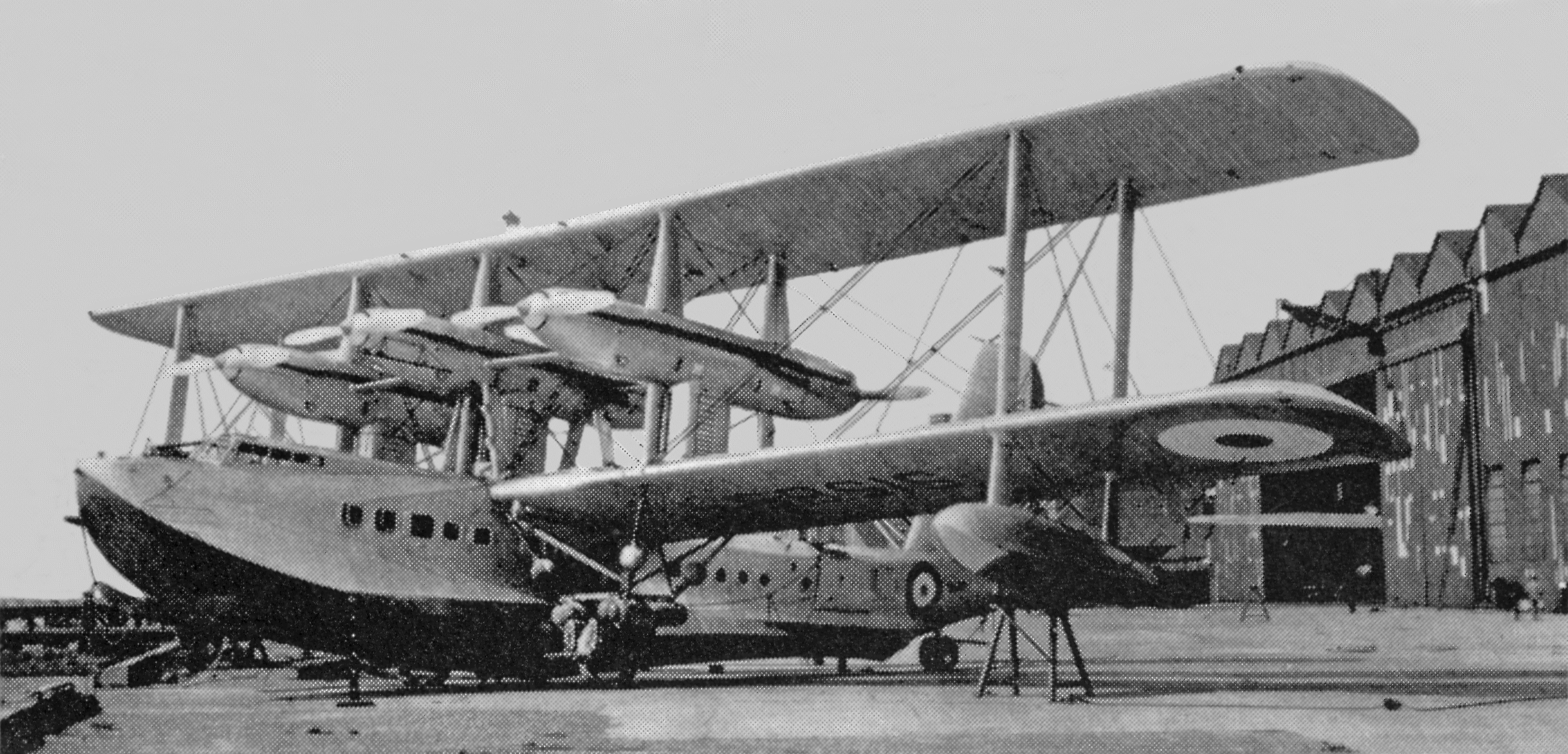
- The prototype and only Sarafand at Felixstowe in 1932.

General information
- Type: Flying boat
- National origin: United Kingdom
- Manufacturer: Short Brothers
- Status: Prototype
- Primary user: Royal Air Force
- Number built: 1

History
- First flight: 30 June 1932
- Retired: 1936

The Short S.14 Sarafand was a British biplane flying boat built by Short Brothers. It was planned as a general reconnaissance aircraft for military service. When it was built in 1932 it was the largest aeroplane in the United Kingdom.

The Sarafand was first proposed by Oswald Short in 1928 as an enlarged development of the Singapore II, to provide transatlantic range capability. Short managed to persuade first his chief designer Arthur Gouge and then the Chief of the Air Staff, Sir Hugh Trenchard (later Viscount Trenchard) of the feasibility of such a large aircraft and Air Ministry specification R.6/28 was drawn up to define the project. It was conducted as a public/private joint venture, the Air Ministry funding it with £60,000 and Short Brothers providing the rest. The aircraft was originally designated the Short R6/28 before being named the Sarafand.

== Design ==
The Sarafand was a six-engined biplane flying boat with equal span wings. Due to the high wing end loads, Gouge specified corrugated steel spars for both upper and lower wings. The six engines, in tractor/pusher pairs, were housed in monocoque nacelles mounted between the wings on integral girders; the central nacelle was further supported by two pairs of splayed struts to the lower wing-roots. The hull, largely constructed of anodised Alclad, had a stainless-steel planing bottom. It had a monoplane tail unit with one large fin and two small auxiliary fins on the tailplane.

== Operational history ==
The Sarafand prototype was built at No. 3 Shop at Rochester, but the shop did not have enough height to fit the upper wing. The semi-completed flying boat was launched into the river on 15 Jun 1932 and moved to a new slipway, originally called the Barge Yard, for final assembly. The maiden flight, with Shorts' chief test pilot John Lankester Parker at the controls and Oswald Short as co-pilot, was made at Rochester on the River Medway on 30 June 1932. Only one S.14 was built (serial S1589); it was later used for experimental flying at the Marine Aircraft Experimental Establishment at Felixstowe. The Sarafand was scrapped there in 1936.

== Operators ==
United Kingdom

- Royal Air Force
  - Marine Aircraft Experimental Establishment, Felixstowe

== Specifications ==
Data from The Short "Sarafand"

General characteristics

- Crew: 9 (2 pilots, navigator, radio operator, engineer, four gunners)
- Length: 89 ft 5 in (27.25 m)
- Wingspan: 120 ft 0 in (36.58 m)
- Height: 30 ft 4 in (9.25 m)
- Wing area: 3,460 sq ft (321 m^{2})
- Empty weight: 44,753 lb (20,300 kg)
- Gross weight: 70,000 lb (31,751 kg)
- Powerplant: 6 × Rolls-Royce Buzzard V12 engine in three tractor/pusher pairs, 850 hp (630 kW) each

Performance

- Maximum speed: 150 mph (240 km/h, 130 kn)
- Range: 1,450 mi (2,330 km, 1,260 nmi)
- Service ceiling: 13,000 ft (4,000 m)
- Rate of climb: 750 ft/min (3.8 m/s)

Armament

- Guns: Four 0.303 in Lewis machine guns mounted on Scarff rings; provision was made for a 1½-pounder (37 mm) gun to be fitted in the bow.

== See also ==
- Dornier Do X
- Blackburn Sydney
- Latécoère 521

Related development

- Felixstowe Fury
- Short Singapore
- Short Empire

Aircraft of comparable role, configuration, and era

- Hall XP2H
- Blackburn Perth
