= Blackburn Perth =

1933 flying boat

R.B.3A Perth
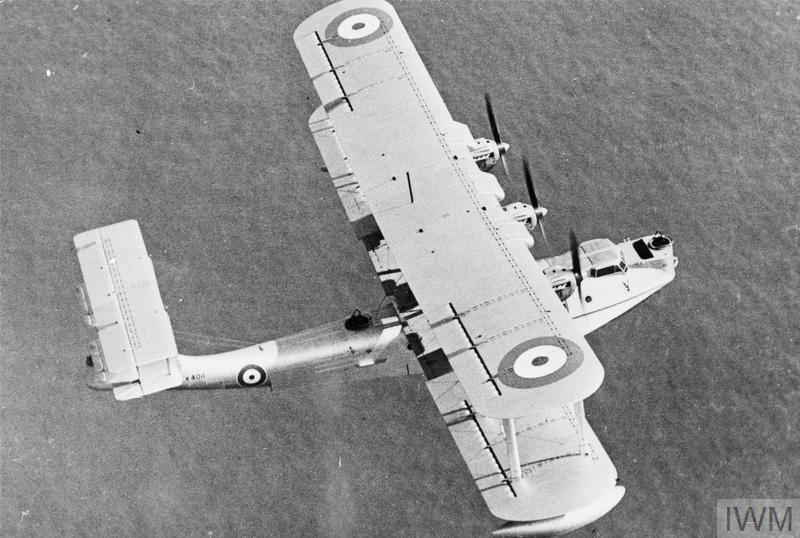
- A Perth, flying with the MAEE in 1935

General information
- Type: Flying boat
- Manufacturer: Blackburn Aeroplane and Motor Company
- Designer: John Douglas Rennie
- Primary user: Royal Air Force
- Number built: 4

History
- Manufactured: 1933–1934
- Introduction date: 1934
- First flight: 11 October 1933
- Retired: 1938
- Developed from: Blackburn Iris

The Blackburn Perth was a British flying boat which served during the interwar period. It was essentially an upgraded Iris and, hence, the largest flying boat to serve with the Royal Air Force at the time (and the largest biplane flying boat ever to serve with the RAF).

== Design and development ==
The Blackburn R.B.3A Perth was designed to replace the earlier Iris to Air Ministry Specification 20/32. Developed from the Iris Mk. V, the Perth first flew in 1933. It differed from the Iris by replacing the Rolls-Royce Condor engines of the Iris with more powerful Rolls-Royce Buzzards and having an enclosed cockpit for the pilots. Unusually, in addition to its standard armament, the Perth was fitted with a Coventry Ordnance Works C.O.W 37 mm (1.46 in) autocannon in its bows.

Four Perths were ordered for service for the RAF.

== Operational history ==
The Perth entered service with the RAF in January 1934, when the second aircraft was delivered to No. 209 Squadron RAF at RAF Mount Batten Plymouth. Perths remained in service until 1937, being replaced by the Short Singapore and the Saro London. One aircraft was retained by the Marine Aircraft Experimental Establishment until 1938.

== Operators ==
United Kingdom

- Royal Air Force
  - No. 204 Squadron RAF
  - No. 209 Squadron RAF
- Marine Aircraft Experimental Establishment

== Specifications (Perth) ==
Data from Aircraft of the Royal Air Force 1918–57

General characteristics

- Crew: 5
- Length: 70 ft 0 in (21.34 m)
- Wingspan: 97 ft 0 in (29.57 m)
- Height: 26 ft 5.5 in (8.065 m)
- Wing area: 2,461 sq ft (228.6 m^{2})
- Empty weight: 20,927 lb (9,492 kg)
- Gross weight: 32,500 lb (14,742 kg)
- Max takeoff weight: 38,000 lb (17,237 kg)
- Powerplant: 3 × Rolls-Royce Buzzard II MS V-12 water-cooled piston engines, 825 hp (615 kW) each
- Propellers: 2-bladed fixed-pitch propellers

Performance

- Maximum speed: 132 mph (212 km/h, 115 kn)
- Cruise speed: 109 mph (175 km/h, 95 kn)
- Range: 1,300 mi (2,100 km, 1,100 nmi)
- Service ceiling: 11,500 ft (3,500 m)
- Rate of climb: 800 ft/min (4.1 m/s)
- Wing loading: 13.2 lb/sq ft (64 kg/m^{2})
- Power/mass: 0.076 hp/lb (0.125 kW/kg)

Armament

- Guns:

- 1 × C.O.W 37 mm (1.46 in) automatic cannon in bow
- 3 × .303 in (7.7 mm) Lewis guns in bow, amidships and tail positions

- Bombs:

- Up to 2,000 lb (907 kg) bombs

== See also ==
Related development

- Felixstowe Fury
- Blackburn Iris

Aircraft of comparable role, configuration, and era

- Short Singapore
- Short Sarafand
- Hall XP2H
