= Short Knuckleduster =

British monoplane flying-boat

R.24/31 (S.18 Knuckleduster)
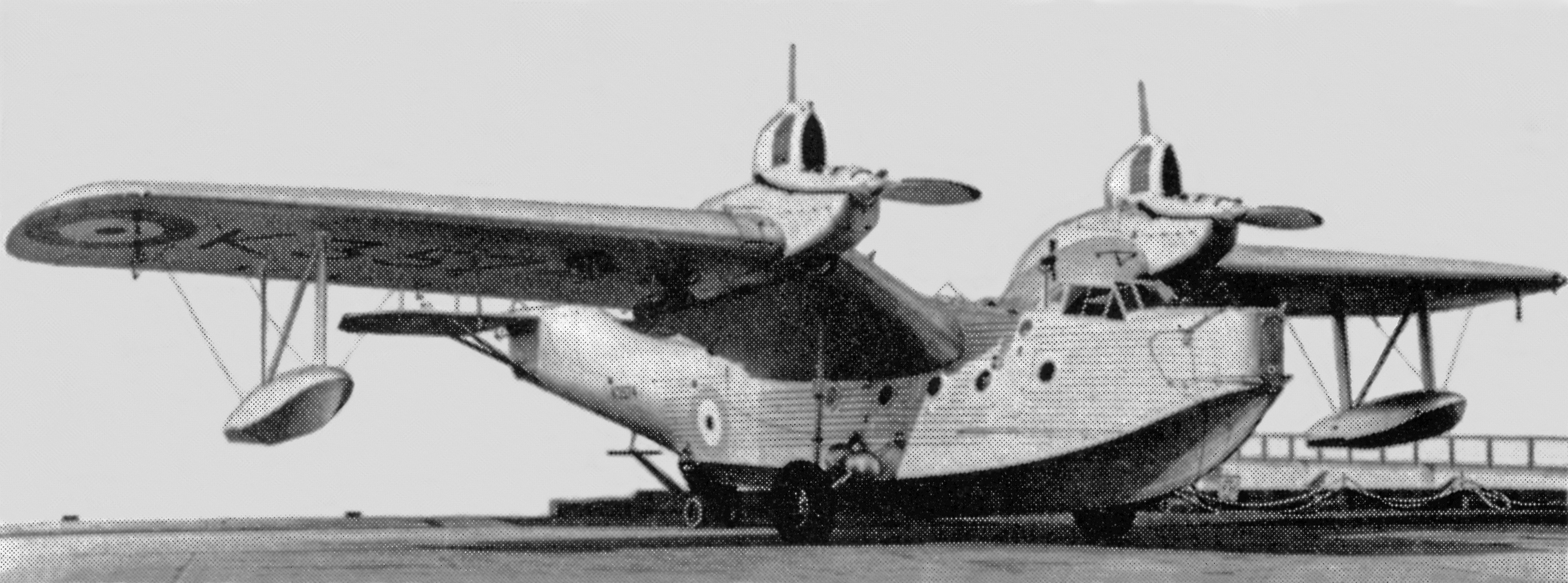
- Short S.18 'Knuckleduster' (K3574), at Felixstowe, 1934

General information
- Type: General purpose flying-boat
- Manufacturer: Short Brothers
- Designer: (Sir) Arthur Gouge
- Status: Prototype
- Primary users: Short Brothers Marine Aircraft Experimental Establishment (MAEE), Felixstowe
- Number built: 1

History
- Manufactured: Rochester
- First flight: 30 November 1933
- Retired: 1938

The Short R.24/31 (or Short S.18 and nicknamed the Knuckleduster) was a British twin-engined, high-wing cantilever gull winged monoplane flying-boat designed and built by Short to Air Ministry specification R.24/31 for a "General Purpose Open Sea Patrol Flying Boat". The contract also specified the use of the experimental Rolls-Royce Goshawk engine. The Saunders-Roe London and the Supermarine Stranraer competed successfully for this contract.

Although it never saw military service, the Knuckleduster provided useful information on the steam-cooling of engines and the handling of monoplane flying-boats; much experimental data gathered contributed to the design of the successful Empire and Short Sunderland aircraft.

== Design and development ==
The British Air Ministry issued its Specification R.24/31 for a "General Purpose Open Sea Patrol Flying Boat" in 1931 and ordered one prototype from each of Saunders-Roe, Supermarine and Shorts. Whereas the other two companies opted for traditional biplane designs, Shorts decided to produce a more modern, all-metal monoplane aircraft with the experimental steam-cooled, cast block Rolls-Royce Goshawk engine, itself a development of the smaller Kestrel engine.

The Knuckleduster's straight-sided hull was of all-metal (Alclad) box-section construction, from the bow as far as the pointed main step at the rear of the planing bottom; aft of the main step the fuselage was of monocoque construction. The central section of the hull was boxed and braced by diagonal frames to bear the loads from the wing-root attachments.

The wing sections inboard of the engines were attached at a 30° dihedral angle, thus providing sufficient clearance for the airscrews from water-spray during takeoff. The wings were designed for high torsional stiffness, each comprising a box-spar with four tapered stainless steel tubular booms. Fuel tanks were mounted within the wings; sprung and braced wingtip floats were fitted. The wing surfaces were made of fabric.

The experimental 720 hp Rolls-Royce Goshawk steam-cooled engine was specified for the "Knuckleduster," which led to many problems due to the engine's unreliability. The engines, with conspicuous condensers protruding vertically from the nacelles, were mounted at the "knuckle" between the dihedral inner and the horizontal outer wing sections.

The tail unit comprised a horizontal plane braced by struts with two vertical fins and rudders, also supported by diagonal bracing to the fuselage. As a result of early test results, fin area was increased; a major redesign of the tail unit was requested by John Parker and implemented at considerable cost.

In addition to the enclosed cockpit in which the pilot and the navigator sat side by side, there was a gunner's cockpit in the bow, stations for the engineer and radio operator and a navigator station with a chart-table, sighting ports and two folding bunks. A third folding bunk and two fixed bunks were mounted in the crew's living quarters, which also included a galley and, further aft, stowage space for drogues and a lavatory.

Further armament was provided by a midships gun mounting and a rear gunner's cockpit in the tail; bombs could be mounted in underwing bomb racks and there was also provision for a torpedo to be transported (but not launched). All guns mountings carried a single Lewis Gun.

== Operational history ==
First launched the previous day, the first flight of the prosaically named R.24/31 (serial K3574) took place on 30 November 1933, piloted by Shorts' Chief Test Pilot John Lankester Parker and crewed by George Cotton and W. Howard Bell. Parker noted that the fins were flexing so he landed immediately. After the fins had stiffening added, the aircraft flew again successfully on 15 December. Other problems found during testing were that the boat could not be trimmed straight and level: the fin area was increased by 18% and the tail was re-designed, including fitting a cupola over the tail gun position.

On 12 June 1934, at the conclusion of test flying, the Knuckleduster was flown to Felixstowe for official trials with the Marine Aircraft Experimental Establishment (MAEE). The aircraft was judged not to meet the specification, particularly regarding top speed and range, even though these were not a priority in the specification. In October 1934 the boat was returned to Rochester for repair following an accident - a collision with another flying-boat. It was repaired and several modifications incorporated before it returned to Felixstowe in March 1935.

In April the Knuckleduster joined 209 Squadron at RAF Mount Batten, Plymouth for service trials alongside the Stranraer and London. This included an appearance at the Royal Air Force display at Hendon. It was returned to the MAEE in October 1935. Despite suffering engine problems, it continued to carry out trial flights until September 1938, when it was retired from flying duties and assigned to No. 2 School of Technical Training at RAF Cosford for instructional purposes.

Although it was not ordered into production - mainly hindered by the unreliable engines - a new Air Ministry Specification R.2/33 was released before it flew, which would lead to the Short Sunderland. The Sunderland was another large monoplane flying-boat that had benefited from the work on the R.24/31.

== Operators ==
United Kingdom

- Royal Air Force
  - No. 209 Squadron RAF
- Marine Aircraft Experimental Establishment

== Specifications ==
Data from Shorts Aircraft since 1900

General characteristics

- Crew: 5
- Length: 63 ft 3 in (19.28 m)
- Wingspan: 90 ft 0 in (27.43 m)
- Height: 19 ft 6 in (5.94 m)
- Wing area: 1,147 sq ft (106.6 m^{2})
- Airfoil: Göttingen 436 (outer wing sections)
- Empty weight: 11,720 lb (5,316 kg)
- Gross weight: 18,500 lb (8,391 kg)
- Powerplant: 2 × Rolls-Royce Goshawk VIII steam-cooled V12 engines, 775 hp (578 kW) each
- Propellers: 2-bladed wooden, 12 ft 6 in (3.81 m) diameter

Performance

- Maximum speed: 150 mph (240 km/h, 130 kn)
- Range: 1,040 mi (1,670 km, 900 nmi)
- Service ceiling: 15,500 ft (4,700 m)
- Rate of climb: 800 ft/min (4.1 m/s)

Armament

- Guns: 3 x Lewis Guns
- Bombs: underwing bomb racks for:
  - 2× 500 lb (230 kg) bombs or
  - 4× 240 (110 kg) bombs

== See also ==
- Saunders-Roe London
- Supermarine Stranraer

Related development

- Short Empire

Aircraft of comparable role, configuration, and era

- Dornier Do 26
