= RAF Alness =

Former Royal Air Force station in Ross and Cromarty, Scotland

RAF Alness ~~RAF Invergordon~~
- Alness, Ross and Cromarty in Scotland

Site information
- Owner: Air Ministry
- Operator: Royal Air Force
- Controlled by: RAF Coastal Command

Location
- Shown within Ross and Cromarty RAF Alness (the United Kingdom)
- Coordinates: 57°40′54″N 004°15′46″W

Site history
- Built: 1920
- In use: 1920-1986
- Battles/wars: European theatre of World War II; Cold War

Airfield information
- Elevation: 13 feet (4 m) AMSL

Royal Air Force Alness, or more simply RAF Alness, is a former Royal Air Force station located 1 mile (1.6 km) southwest of Alness, Ross and Cromarty, Scotland and 14 miles (23 km) north of Inverness, Inverness-shire.

== History ==
RAF Alness was previously called RAF Invergordon until 10 February 1943.

The following units were based here at some point:

- No. 201 Squadron RAF
- No. 209 Squadron RAF
- No. 210 Squadron RAF
- No. 228 Squadron RAF
- No. 240 Squadron RAF
- No. 4 (Coastal) Operational Training Unit RAF (June 1941 - August 1946)
- No. 5 Flying Boat Servicing Unit RAF (November 1942 - 1945)
- No. 6 Air/Sea Rescue Marine Craft Unit RAF
- No. 302 Ferry Training Unit RAF (July 1945 - April 1946)
- No. 1100 Marine Craft Unit RAF
- Detachment of Coastal Command Flying Instructors School RAF (July - October 1945)
- Flying Boat Development Flight RAF (July 1924)
- Seaplane Training Squadron RAF (September 1939 - March 1941) absorbed into No. 4 (C)OTU

== Current use ==
The site is now Alness Point Business Park.

== See also ==
- List of former Royal Air Force stations
