= RAF Mount Batten =

Former Royal Air Force station and flying boat base in Devon, England

RAF Mount Batten
- Plymouth Sound, Devon in England
- "In Honour Bound"

Site information
- Type: Seaplane Station and Flying Boat base
- Owner: Ministry of Defence
- Operator: Royal Naval Air Service; Royal Air Force
- Condition: Closed

Location
- Shown within Devon RAF Mount Batten (the United Kingdom)
- Coordinates: 50°21′32″N 4°07′48″W

Site history
- In use: 1917–4 July 1992
- Battles/wars: First World War; Second World War

Royal Air Force Mount Batten, or more simply RAF Mount Batten, is a former Royal Air Force station and flying boat base at Mount Batten, a peninsula in Plymouth Sound, Devon, England, UK. Originally a seaplane station opened in 1917 as a Royal Navy Air Service Station Cattewater it became RAF Cattewater in 1918 and in 1928 was renamed RAF Mount Batten. The base is named after Captain Batten, a Civil War commander who defended this area at the time, with the Mountbatten family motto In Honour Bound taken as the station's motto.

Today, little evidence of the RAF base remains apart from several memorials, some aviation-related road names, the main slipway and two impressive Grade II listed F-type aeroplane hangars dating from 1917.

== History ==
=== Royal Naval Air Station Cattewater ===
As early as 1913 the sheltered Cattewater in Plymouth Sound was used for seaplane trials and in 1916 plans to open a Royal Navy seaplane station were agreed. In February 1917 RNAS Cattewater was opened. It had a hangar for aircraft, storage and maintenance and a stone pier with a railway track that enabled a steam crane to place the seaplanes in and out of the water. The first aircraft based there were the Short 184 and these were soon followed by other seaplanes. Operational flying was carried out from Cattewater, mainly coastal patrols.

=== Royal Air Force Cattewater ===
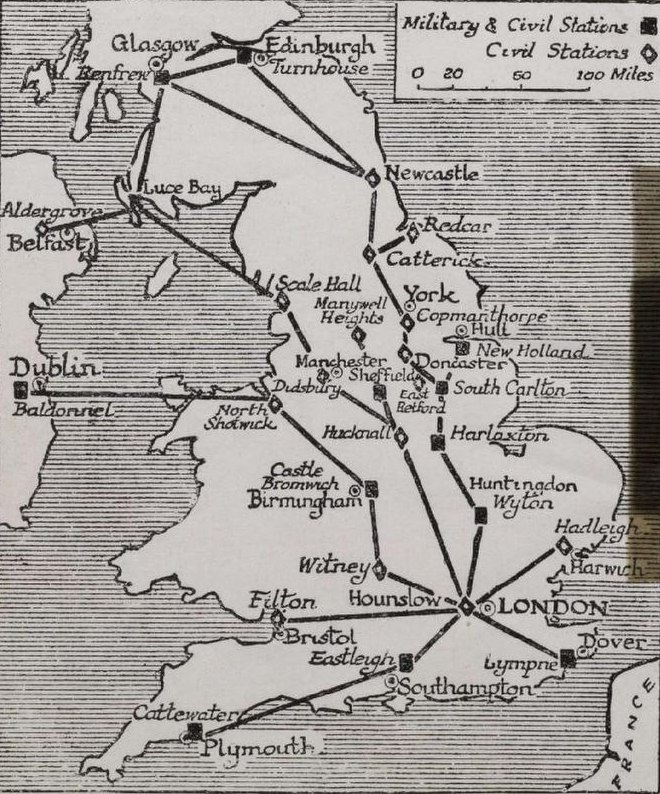
"Map of Air Routes and Landing Places in Great Britain, as temporarily arranged by the Air Ministry for civilian flying", published in 1919, showing Cattewater as a "military and civil station".

With the formation in April 1918 of the Royal Air Force the station became RAF Cattewater. The station was little used but in 1919 the station became notable with the arrival of the Curtiss NC 4 flying boat making the first aerial crossing of the Atlantic. From 1923 the station was re-built and extended and was re-opened in 1928.

=== Royal Air Force Mount Batten ===
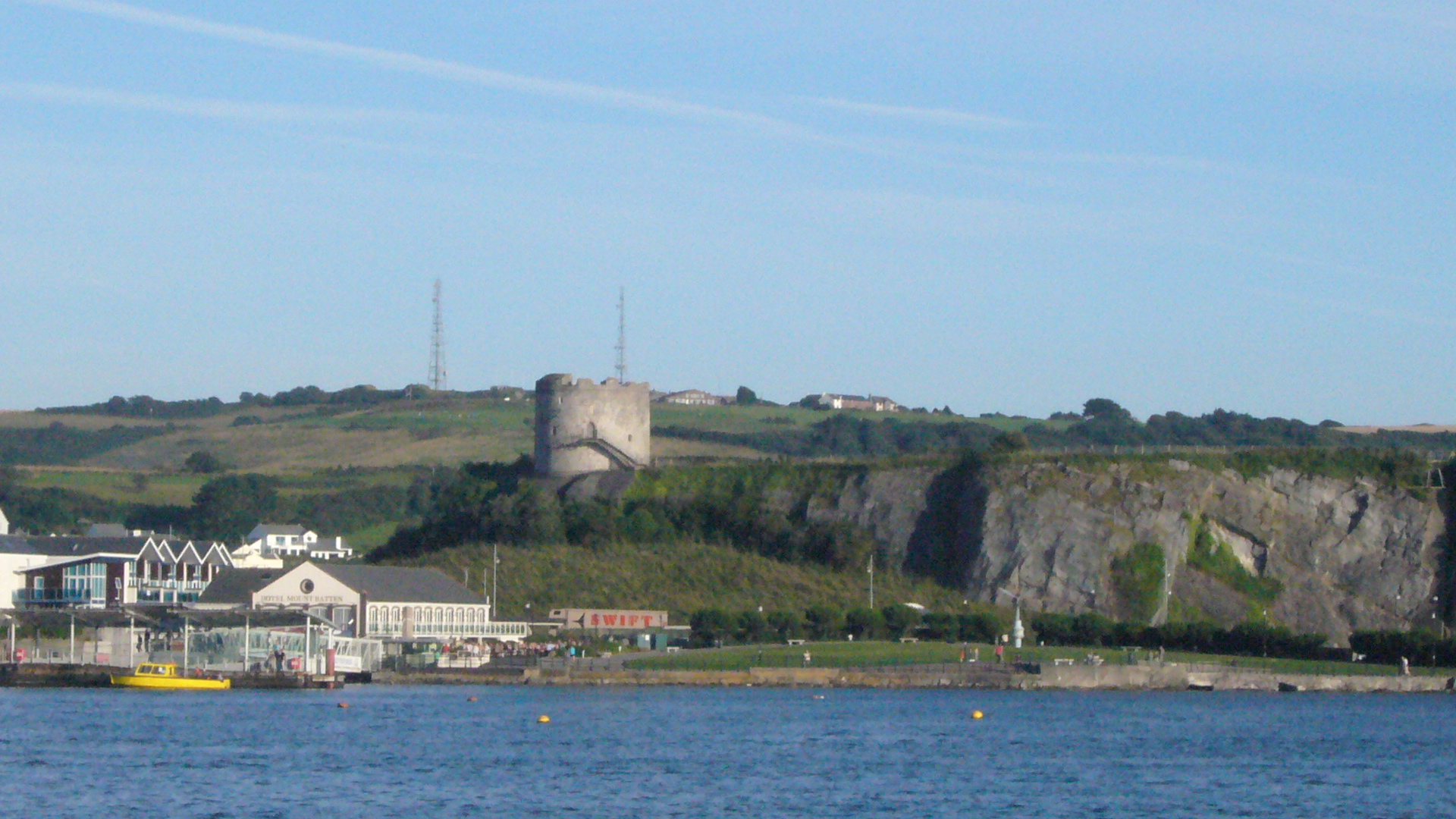
Mount Batten from Plymouth Hoe

On 1 October 1928, following re-building, the old Cattewater seaplane station was opened as RAF Mount Batten to provide a base for flying boats to defend south-west England. The first squadron (No. 203 Squadron RAF) was equipped with the Supermarine Southampton. The station also became a base for high-speed air sea rescue launches on which, in the 1930s, was employed Aircraftman Shaw, better known as T. E. Lawrence.

With the start of the Second World War there was an increase in operational flying from Mount Batten. It was also the target for a number of German air raids resulting in the destruction of one of the hangars and a Short Sunderland on 28 November 1940. At the end of the war the station became a Maintenance Unit.

At the end of the 1950s the station became the Marine Craft Training School and from 1961 became the main base of the RAF Marine Branch, with the closure of No. 238 MU, Calshot until the marine branch closed in 1986 and the School of Survival until it moved to RAF St Mawgan in 1992. It also housed No. 3 Maritime Headquarters Unit of the Royal Auxiliary Air Force providing Communications and Operations Room personnel.

== RAF units and aircraft ==
| Unit | Dates | Aircraft | Variant | Notes |
|---|---|---|---|---|
| No. 203 Squadron RAF | 1929 | Supermarine Southampton | | |
| No. 204 Squadron RAF | 1929–1935 | Supermarine Southampton | | |
| No. 209 Squadron RAF | 1930–1935 | Blackburn Iris III (1930–1932), Saro A.7 (1932), Blackburn Iris IV (1932–1934), Short Singapore II (1932), Supermarine Southampton II (1933–1935), Blackburn Perth (1934), Saro London I (1934), Supermarine Stranraer (1935), Short R.24/31 (1935) | | |
| No. 237 Squadron RAF | 1918–1919 | Short 184 | | Formed from 420, 421, 422 and 423 Flights. |
| No. 238 Squadron RAF | 1918–1919 | Curtiss H.16; Short 184; Felixstowe F.2A; Felixstowe F.3 | | Formed from 347, 348 and 349 Flights. |
| No. 461 Squadron RAAF | 1942 | Short Sunderland | II and III | Australian squadron under RAF operational control. |
| No. 10 Squadron RAAF | 1941–1945 | Short Sunderland | | Australian squadron under RAF operational control |
