= RAF Hamworthy =

Former Royal Air Force seaplane base in Dorset, England

RAF Hamworthy RAF Poole HMS Turtle
- Poole Harbour, Dorset, United Kingdom

Site information
- Type: Military Seaplane Base

Location
- RAF Hamworthy, shown within Dorset
- Coordinates: 50°42′20″N 001°57′30″W

Site history
- In use: 1939-1948
- Battles/wars: European theatre of World War II

Garrison information
- Garrison: RAF Coastal Command
- Occupants: No.19 Group Coastal Command, Royal Navy, BOAC

Royal Air Force Hamworthy, or RAF Hamworthy, is a former Royal Air Force Coastal Command seaplane base at Poole Harbour in Dorset, England, that was operational between 1939 and 1948. During the Second World War, it was used by the Royal Air Force, the Royal Navy and BOAC.

== RAF units and aircraft ==
Unit	Dates	Aircraft	Variant	Notes
No. 210 Squadron RAF	1943	Consolidated Catalina	IB	Detachments to Gibraltar.
No. 461 Squadron RAAF	1942-1943	Short Sunderland	II and III	
