= Saro London =

British flying boat built from 1934

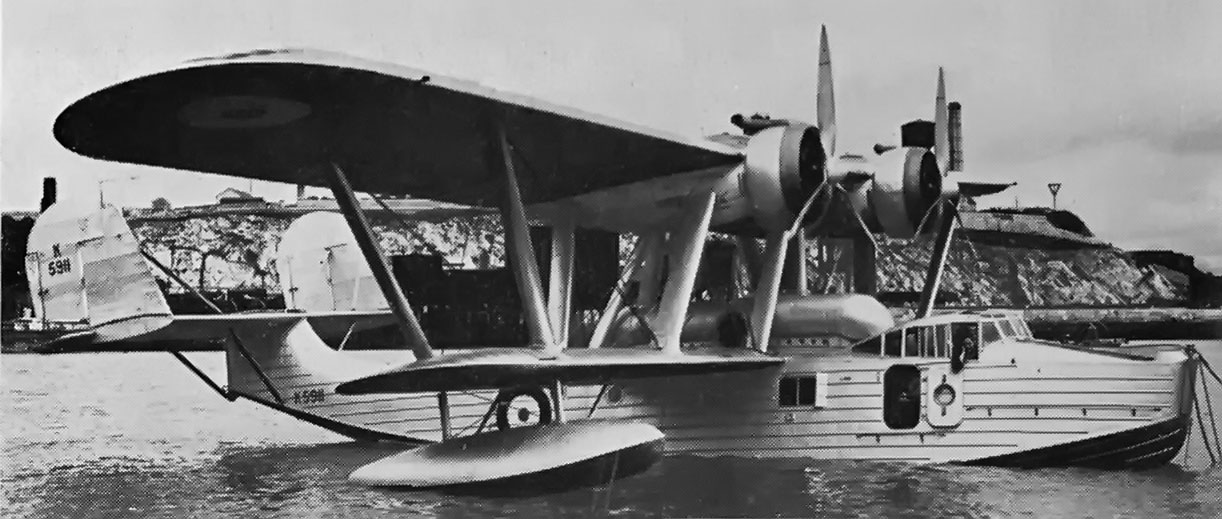
- A Saro London II of 204 Squadron shown fitted with the dorsal fuel tank

General information
- Type: Reconnaissance flying-boat
- Manufacturer: Saunders-Roe Ltd
- Primary users: Royal Air Force Royal Canadian Air Force
- Number built: 31

History
- Manufactured: 1934–1938
- Introduction date: 1936
- First flight: March 1934
- Retired: 1941
- Developed from: Saro A.7 Severn

The Saunders Roe A.27 London was a British military biplane flying boat built by the Saunders Roe company. Only 31 were built, entering service with the Royal Air Force (RAF) in 1936. Although due for replacement by the outbreak of the Second World War, they saw some active service pending the introduction of the unsuccessful Lerwick.

== Development ==
The A.27 London was designed in response to the Air Ministry Specification R.24/31 issued for a "General Purpose Open Sea Patrol Flying Boat" and was based on the Saro A.7 Severn. The London and its contemporary, the Supermarine Stranraer, were the last multi-engine, biplane flying-boats to see service with the RAF. The design used an all-metal corrugated hull and fabric-covered wing and tail surfaces, with two Bristol Pegasus II radial engines, mounted on the upper wing to keep them clear of spray while taking off and landing.

The first prototype first flew in March 1934 and then went on to serve until 1936 with 209 Squadron and 210 Squadron of the RAF at RAF Felixstowe and Gibraltar respectively.

The first deliveries of production aircraft began in March 1936 with Pegasus III engines and from the eleventh aircraft onwards the Pegasus X engine was fitted instead as the London Mk.II. Earlier Londons were retrofitted with the Pegasus X and also became "Mk.II"s.

== Operational history ==
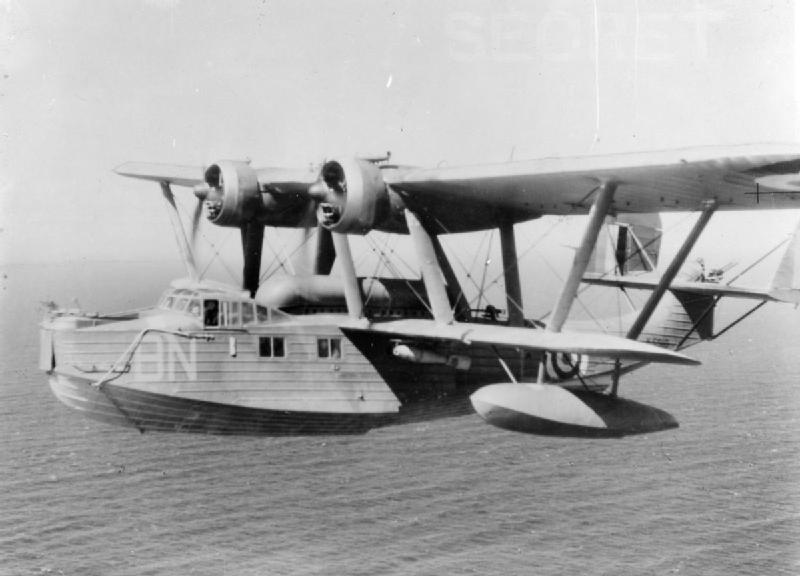
A Saro London of 240 Squadron RAF on patrol over the North Sea.

The London Mk.II model equipped 201 Squadron at RAF Calshot beginning in 1936, replacing Supermarine Southamptons. Others were delivered in October 1936 to 204 Squadron at RAF Mount Batten, Plymouth, also replacing Southamptons. More were delivered to the same squadron in 1937 to replace Blackburn Perths, and to 202 Squadron at Kalafrana, Malta, replacing Supermarine Scapas and 228 Squadron at Pembroke Dock.

In 1937–1938 204 Squadron used five Londons equipped with auxiliary external fuel tanks for a long-distance training flight to Australia to celebrate the 150th anniversary of the founding of the Colony at Sydney, New South Wales. In this configuration, they had a range of 2,600 mi (4,200 km).

At the outbreak of the Second World War in September 1939, Londons equipped 201 Squadron, which was by now stationed at Sullom Voe in Shetland, and 202 Squadron at Gibraltar, as well as 240 Squadron at Invergordon, which had re-equipped with Londons in July 1939. These aircraft carried out patrols over the North Sea and the Mediterranean. Some were fitted with a dorsal fuel tank to increase operational radius. Armament in the form of bombs, depth charges, and naval mines up to a total weight of 2,000 lb (910 kg) could be carried beneath the lower wings.

Gradually, newer aircraft such as the Lockheed Hudson took over, while squadrons flying Atlantic and Mediterranean patrols were re-equipped with Short Sunderlands. All were withdrawn from front-line duties by the middle of 1941.

== Variants ==
Prototype
One only
London Mk.I
10 built with two 820 hp Pegasus III engines and two-bladed propellers. Later converted to Mk II.
London Mk.II
20 built with two 915 hp Pegasus X engines and four-bladed propellers.

== Operators ==
United Kingdom

- Royal Air Force
  - 201 Squadron (Apr 1936 – Apr 1940)
  - 202 Squadron (Sep 1937 – Jun 1941)
  - 204 Squadron (Oct 1936 – Jul 1939)
  - 209 Squadron (Oct 1934 – Feb 1936)
  - 210 Squadron (Oct–Nov 1935)
  - 228 Squadron (Feb 1937 – Sep 1938)
  - 240 Squadron (Jul 1939 – Jul 1940)

== Specifications (London Mk.II) ==

Data from War Planes of the Second World War: Volume Five Flying Boats

General characteristics

- Crew: 6
- Length: 56 ft 6 in (17.22 m)
- Wingspan: 80 ft 0 in (24.38 m)
- Height: 18 ft 9 in (5.72 m)
- Wing area: 1,425 sq ft (132.4 m^{2})
- Empty weight: 11,100 lb (5,035 kg)
- Gross weight: 18,400 lb (8,346 kg)
- Powerplant: 2 × Bristol Pegasus X 9-cylinder air-cooled radial piston engines, 915 hp (682 kW) each
- Propellers: 3-bladed fixed-pitch propellers

Performance

- Maximum speed: 155 mph (249 km/h, 135 kn)
- Cruise speed: 128 mph (206 km/h, 111 kn)
- Range: 1,100 mi (1,800 km, 960 nmi)
- Ferry range: 1,740 mi (2,800 km, 1,510 nmi) with auxiliary fuel tank over fuselage
- Service ceiling: 19,900 ft (6,100 m)
- Rate of climb: 1,180 ft/min (6.0 m/s)

Armament

- Guns: 3 × Lewis gun
- Bombs: 2,000 lb (910 kg) of bombs, mines or depth charges

== See also ==
- Short Knuckleduster

Related development

- Saunders A.14
- Saunders Severn

Aircraft of comparable role, configuration, and era

- Supermarine Stranraer

Related lists

- List of aircraft of World War II
- List of aircraft of the Royal Air Force
- List of flying boats and floatplanes
