= No. 210 Squadron RAF =

Defunct flying squadron of the Royal Air Force

- Squadron badge of No. 210 Squadron RAF
- Active: 12 February 1917(RNAS)– 24 June 1919; 1 February 1920 – 1 April 1923; 1 March 1931 – 31 December 1943; 1 January 1944 – 4 June 1945; 1 June 1946 – 31 January 1957; 1 December 1958 – 31 October 1970; 1 November 1970 – 17 November 1971
- Country: United Kingdom
- Branch: Royal Air Force
- Role: Maritime patrol
- Mottos: Welsh: Yn y nwyfre yn hedfan ("Hovering in the Heavens")
- Battle honours: Western Front, 1916–18; Ypres 1917; Lys; Atlantic 1939–45; Arctic 1945; Bismarck; North Africa, 1942–43; Biscay 1943; All these honours are emblazoned on the squadron standard

Commanders
- Notable commanders: Wg Cdr R. Leckie; Wg Cdr A.T. Harris

Insignia
- Squadron Badge heraldry: A griffin segreant
- Squadron Codes: VG (May 1939 – Sep 1939); DA (Sep 1939 – Mar 1944); OZ (Apr 1946 – 1951); L (1951–1956)

No. 210 Squadron was a Royal Air Force unit established in the First World War. Disbanded and reformed a number of times in the ensuing years, it operated as a fighter squadron during the First World War and as a maritime patrol squadron during the Spanish Civil War, the Second World War and the Cold War before it was last deactivated in 1971.

== History ==
=== World War I ===
No. 210 Squadron was formed from No. 10 Squadron, Royal Naval Air Service (RNAS), when the Royal Air Force (RAF) was established on 1 April 1918. No. 10 (Naval) Squadron had been raised on 12 February 1917, flying Nieuports and later Sopwith Triplanes, which were in turn replaced by Sopwith Camels in late 1917. One of its pilots was Raymond Collishaw, the RNAS's highest-scoring ace and later an Air Vice-Marshal. The unit remained in Europe after the war, until February 1919. It then returned to the UK and was disbanded on 24 June 1919.

=== Between the wars ===
The squadron was reformed on 1 February 1920 from No. 186 Squadron, equipped with the Sopwith Cuckoo torpedo bomber. It was again disbanded on 1 April 1923.

The squadron reformed on 1 March 1931, equipped with Supermarine Southampton flying boats. The squadron initially operated out of Felixstowe before moving three months later to Pembroke Dock in Wales, June 1931. One of its pilots at this time was Don Bennett, the future commanding officer of the Pathfinder Force. In 1935 the squadron converted to the Short Rangoon, a three-engined biplane flying boat, and was posted to Gibraltar. A year later, the squadron returned home to be re-equipped with the Short Singapore, during August 1936.

In 1937 the squadron was posted to Algeria as part of an Anglo-French force charged with countering submarine attacks on neutral shipping during the Spanish Civil War. The squadron returned home in December 1937. In June 1938 the squadron converted to the Short Sunderland.

=== World War II ===
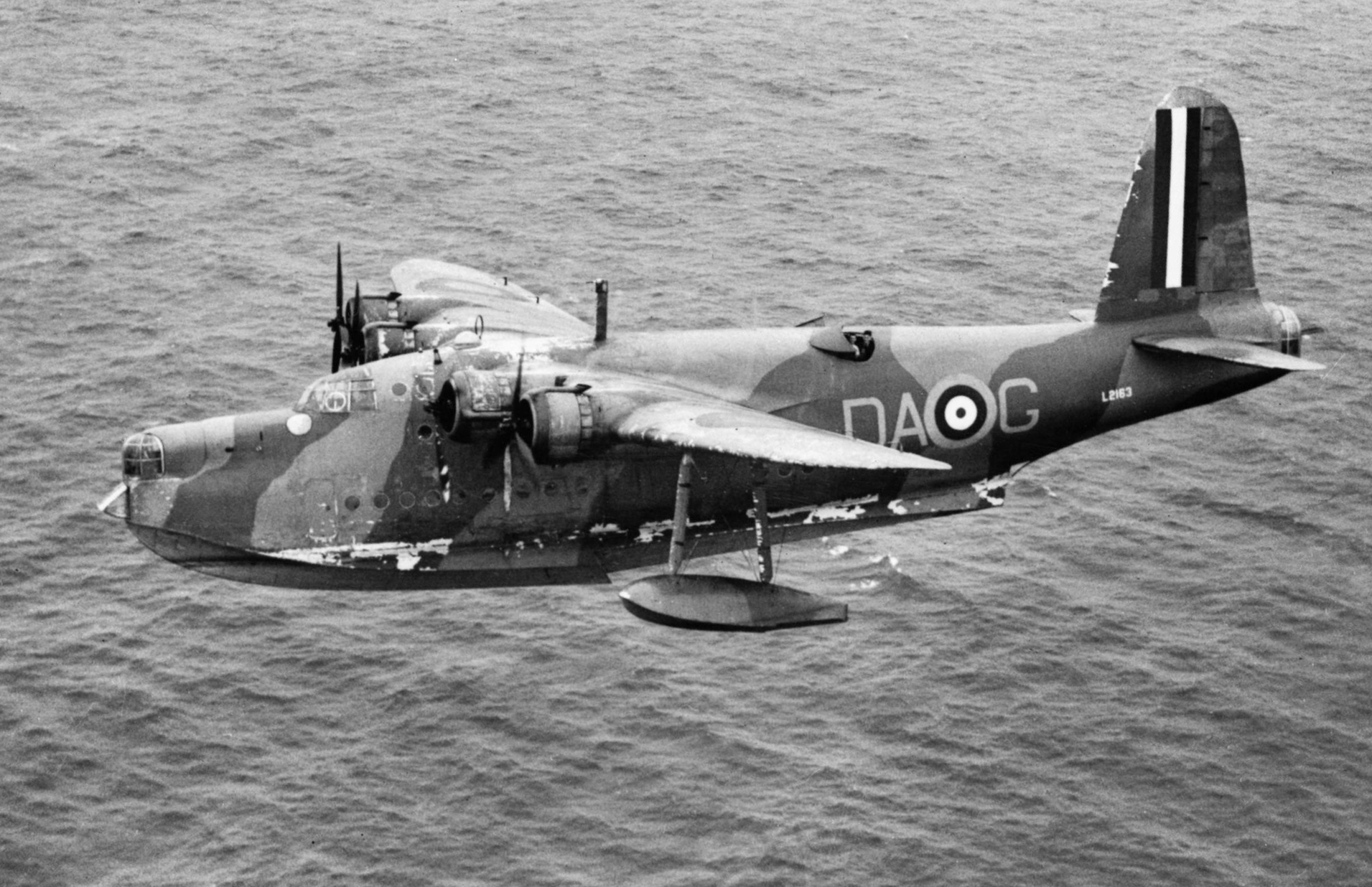
A 210 Squadron Sunderland I escorting convoy TC.6, 31 July 1940.

When World War II began, detachments from No. 210 Squadron were sent to Invergordon and Sullom Voe. On 9 April 1940 the first RAF aircraft, a Sunderland was shot down over Sylling, Norway. In July 1940 the squadron moved to RAF Oban and began to re-equip with the Consolidated Catalina. The squadron returned to Pembroke Dock in October 1942, with a detachment based at Gibraltar. In April 1943, squadron headquarters moved to RAF Hamworthy. The Gibraltar detachment was transferred to No. 202 Squadron on 31 December 1943 and the remainder of the squadron at Hamworthy disbanded.

The squadron reformed the day after at Sullom Voe, when No. 190 Squadron was renumbered on 1 January 1944. During this time, Flying Officer John Cruickshank, a pilot with the squadron, was awarded the Victoria Cross for flying his aircraft home despite extensive wounds received during an attack on a German U-boat. This was one out of a total of eight German U-boats that fell victim to the Catalinas of 210 squadron. When the war ended 210 sqn flew a month postal runs to Norwegian ports but shortly thereafter officially disbanded on 4 June 1945 at Sullom Voe. The squadron's history however has a flight with the RAF Film Unit along the Norwegian coast as flown as late as on 10 June 1945.

=== Post war ===
==== Lancasters and Neptunes ====
On 1 June 1946, No. 210 Squadron reformed again when one flight ('Y') of No. 179 Squadron was renumbered. Eventually the other flight of no. 179 sqn ('X') was absorbed later in September 1946. It operated Lancaster GR.3s from RAF St Eval until September 1952, then moved to RAF Topcliffe, re-equipping with Neptune MR.1 aircraft in February 1953. The squadron disbanded at Topcliffe on 31 January 1957.

==== On Shackletons ====
The squadron reformed one more time on 1 December 1958 when No. 269 Squadron was renumbered, taking over that squadron's maritime patrol tasks from RAF Ballykelly, equipped with the Shackleton MR.2. The tasks included taking part in the UN sanctions against Rhodesia, flown by two detachments from Sharjah in the Trucial States and Majunga, Madagascar. This lasted until 31 October 1970, when the Squadron disbanded. On 1 November 1970 the squadron's former detachment at Sharjah reformed as the new 210 sqn, but this did not last for long, as the squadron disbanded there for the last time at Sarjah on 17 November 1971.

== Aircraft operated ==
From	To	Aircraft	Variant
Feb 1917	May 1917	Nieuport 12	
Feb 1917	May 1917	Nieuport 17	
Feb 1917	Jul 1917	Sopwith Triplane	
August 1917	Jun 1919	Sopwith Camel	
Feb 1920	Apr 1923	Sopwith Cuckoo	
May 1931	Jul 1935	Supermarine Southampton	Mk.II
Jan 1935	Aug 1935	Short Singapore	Mk.III
Sep 1935	Aug 1936	Short Rangoon	Mk.I
Oct 1935	Nov 1935	Saro London	Mk.II
Oct 1935	Nov 1935	Supermarine Stranraer	Mk.I
Sep 1936	Nov 1938	Short Singapore	Mk.III
Jun 1938	Apr 1941	Short Sunderland	Mk.I
Apr 1941	Mar 1944	Consolidated Catalina	Mks.I and Ib
Aug 1942	Dec 1943	Consolidated Catalina	Mks.IIa and III
Mar 1944	Jun 1945	Consolidated Catalina	Mk.IV
Jun 1946	Oct 1952	Avro Lancaster	ASR.3
Feb 1953	Jan 1957	Lockheed Neptune	MR.1
Dec 1958	Nov 1971	Avro Shackleton	MR.2

== Squadron bases ==
From	To	Base
12 Feb 1917	27 Mar 1917	Saint-Pol-sur-Mer, France
27 Mar 1917	15 May 1917	Furnes, Belgium
15 May 1917	4 Oct 1917	Droglandt, France
4 Oct 1917	27 Nov 1917	Leffrinckoucke, France
27 Nov 1917	31 Mar 1918	Téteghem, France
31 Mar 1918	9 Apr 1918	Treizennes, France
9 Apr 1918	27 Apr 1918	Liettres, France
27 Apr 1918	30 May 1918	Saint-Omer, France
30 May 1918	8 Jul 1918	Sainte-Marie-Cappel, France
8 Jul 1918	22 Jul 1918	Téteghem, France
22 Jul 1918	23 Oct 1918	Eringhem, France
23 Oct 1918	17 Feb 1919	Boussières, France
17 Feb 1919	24 Jun 1919	RAF Scopwick, Lincolnshire
1 Feb 1920	1 Apr 1923	RAF Gosport, Hampshire
1 Mar 1931	15 Jun 1931	RAF Felixstowe, Suffolk
15 Jun 1931	28 Sep 1935	RAF Pembroke Dock, Pembrokeshire, Wales
28 Sep 1935	7 Aug 1936	RAF Gibraltar
7 Aug 1936	22 Sep 1937	Pembroke Dock, Pembrokeshire, Wales
22 Sep 1937	18 Dec 1937	Arzeu, Algeria
18 Dec 1937	29 Sep 1938	Pembroke Dock, Pembrokeshire, Wales
29 Sep 1938	8 Oct 1938	Tayport, Fife, Scotland
8 Oct 1938	23 Oct 1939	Pembroke Dock, Pembrokeshire, Wales
23 Oct 1939	6 Nov 1939	RAF Invergordon, Ross and Cromarty, Scotland
6 Nov 1939	24 Nov 1939	Pembroke Dock, Pembrokeshire, Wales
24 Nov 1939	21 May 1940	Invergordon (Det. at Sullom Voe, Shetland, Scotland)
21 May 1940	13 Jul 1940	Pembroke Dock, Pembrokeshire, Wales
13 Jul 1940	28 Feb 1942	RAF Oban, Argyll and Bute, Scotland (Dets. at Reykjavík, Iceland, Sullom Voe and Stranraer
28 Feb 1942	4 Oct 1942	RAF Sullom Voe, Shetland, Scotland (Det. at Grasnaya, Russia)
4 Oct 1942	21 Apr 1943	Pembroke Dock, Pembrokeshire, Wales (Det. at Gibraltar)
21 Apr 1943	31 Dec 1943	RAF Hamworthy, Dorset (Det. at Gibraltar)
1 Jan 1944	4 Jun 1945	Sullom Voe, Shetland, Scotland (Det. at Pembroke Dock, Pembrokeshire, Wales)
1 Jun 1946	15 Apr 1952	RAF St Eval, Cornwall (Dets. at Ein Shemer, Israel, RAF Gibraltar and RAF Luqa, Malta
15 Apr 1952	26 May 1952	RAF St Mawgan, Cornwall
26 May 1952	15 Apr 1952	RAF St Eval, Cornwall
10 Sep 1952	26 Sep 1952	RAF Ballykelly, County Londonderry, Northern Ireland
26 Sep 1952	31 Jan 1957	RAF Topcliffe, North Yorkshire
1 Dec 1958	31 Oct 1970	RAF Ballykelly, County Londonderry, Northern Ireland (Dets. at Sharjah, Trucial States and Majunga, Madagascar
1 Nov 1970	15 Nov 1971	Sharjah, Trucial States (United Arab Emirates)

== Commanding officers ==
From	To	Name				
Feb 1917	Apr 1917	Squadron Commander (S/Cdr.) C. D. Breese				
Apr 1917	Sep 1917	S/Cdr. Bertram Charles Bell (acting)				
Sep 1917	Apr 1918	S/Cdr. B.C. Bell				
Apr 1918	Oct 1918	Maj. B.C. Bell				
Oct 1918	Jun 1919	Cpt. A.W. Carter, DFC				
Feb 1920	Apr 1920	S/Ldr. J.A.G. de Courcy				
Apr 1920	Sep 1920	S/Ldr. C. W. H. Pulford				
Sep 1920	Apr 1923	W/Cdr. N.J. Gill				
Mar 1931	Mar 1933	W/Cdr. R. Leckie, DSO, DSC, DFC				
Mar 1933	Jul 1933	W/Cdr. A.T. Harris				
Jul 1933	May 1934	W/Cdr. R.H. Kershaw				
May 1934	Oct 1935	S/Ldr. A.F. Lang				
Oct 1935	Dec 1938	W/Cdr. W.N. Plenderlieth				
Dec 1938	Jan 1939	S/Ldr. G.A. Bolland				
Jan 1939	Jan 1940	W/Cdr. W.J. Daddo-Langlois				
Jan 1940	Jan 1941	W/Cdr. F.J. Fressanges				
Jan 1941	Nov 1941	W/Cdr. G.G. Barret				
Nov 1941	Jun 1942	W/Cdr. W.H. Hutton				
Jun 1942	Jan 1943	W/cdr. H.B. Johnson				
Jan 1943	Nov 1943	W/Cdr. C.H. Brandon				
Nov 1943	Jan 1944	W/Cdr. S.R. Gibbs, DFC				
Jan 1944	Mar 1944	W/Cdr. P.H. Allington				
Mar 1944	Oct 1944	W/Cdr. L.W. Burgess				
Oct 1944	Nov 1944	S/Ldr. Smallman				
Nov 1944	Jun 1945	W/cdr. R.W. Whittome				
Jun 1946	Jan 1947	S/Ldr. A. Henderson, AFC				
Jan 1947	Oct 1947	S/Ldr. F.G. Paisley, DFC				
Oct 1947	Apr 1949	S/Ldr. W.D. Hodgkinson, DFC, AFC				
Apr 1949	Jun 1951	S/Ldr. P.R. Casement, DSO, DFC				
Jun 1951	Nov 1951	S/Ldr. P.J. Cundy				
Nov 1951	Aug 1952	S/Ldr. E.F.J. Odoire, DFC, AFC				
Aug 1952	Jan 1954	S/Ldr. H.H. Eccles				
Jan 1954	Dec 1955	S/Ldr. H.R. Kerr, OBE				
Dec 1955	Jan 1957	W/Cdr. J.L. Nunn, DFC				
Dec 1958		W/Cdr. J.F. Halton				
1961	1962	W/Cdr. A.F. Carvosso	1964 W/Cdr. J.W. King ref: on Squadron	1964	Wg Cdr Boyd	W/Cdr. D.G.F. Palmer
Nov 1970	Nov 1971	S/Ldr. G. Moule				
