= Hall XP2H =

1932 prototype US flying boat by Hall

XP2H-2
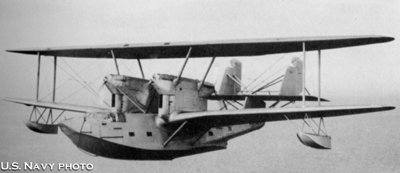

General information
- Type: Patrol flying boat
- National origin: United States of America
- Manufacturer: Hall-Aluminum Aircraft Corporation
- Primary user: United States Navy
- Number built: 1

History
- First flight: November 15, 1932

The Hall XP2H-1 was an American prototype four-engined biplane flying boat of the 1930s. Intended as an experimental very-long-range maritime patrol aircraft, a single example was built. The XP2H-1 was the largest four engine biplane aircraft ever procured by the US Navy.

== Development and design ==
In 1930, the United States Navy ordered a single example of a large flying boat from the Hall-Aluminum Aircraft Corporation, to meet a requirement for an experimental very-long-range patrol aircraft. The resulting design, designated XP2H-1, was a four-engined biplane with an all-aluminum hull, scaled-up from the smaller PH flying boat, which accommodated a crew of six. The wings were of fabric-skinned aluminum construction and were of trapezoidal shape. The water-cooled V-12 Curtiss V-1570 Conqueror engines were mounted in tandem push-pull pairs between the wings, in nacelles attached to the lower wings.

The XP2H-1 first flew on November 15, 1932, and was extensively tested, demonstrating excellent performance, being 11 mph (10 kn; 18 km/h) faster than predicted. It was possible to cruise on just two engines to extend range, and in 1935, the XP2H-1 was used to carry out a nonstop flight between Norfolk, Virginia and Coco Solo, Panama Canal Zone. The XP2H-1 took 25 hours and 15 minutes to fly the 2,000 mi (1,738 nmi; 3,219 km) distance between these two locations. It was destroyed later in the year attempting to alight in open water. No further P2Hs were built, with the US Navy equipping its patrol squadrons with smaller flying boats such as the Consolidated P2Y.

== Operators ==
United States

- United States Navy

== Specifications ==
Data from General Dynamic Aircraft and their Predecessors

General characteristics

- Crew: 6
- Length: 64 ft 6.5 in (19.672 m)
- Wingspan: 112 ft 0 in (34.14 m)
- Height: 25 ft 6 in (7.77 m)
- Wing area: 2,742 sq ft (254.7 m^{2})
- Airfoil: root: Clark Y 10.7-15.99%; tip: Clark Y 11.7%
- Empty weight: 20,865 lb (9,464 kg)
- Gross weight: 35,393 lb (16,054 kg)
- Max takeoff weight: 42,193 lb (19,138 kg)
- Powerplant: 4 × Curtiss V-1570-54 Conqueror V-12 water-cooled piston engines, 600 hp (450 kW) each
- Propellers: 3-bladed tractor and pusher propellers

Performance

- Maximum speed: 140 mph (230 km/h, 120 kn)
- Cruise speed: 120 mph (190 km/h, 100 kn)
- Range: 2,150 mi (3,460 km, 1,870 nmi)
- Ferry range: 3,350 mi (5,390 km, 2,910 nmi)
- Service ceiling: 10,900 ft (3,300 m)
- Time to altitude: 5,000 ft (1,500 m) in 8 minutes 42 seconds

Armament

- Guns: 5x flexibly mounted 0.3 in (7.62 mm) Browning machine guns in nose, dorsal waist and tail positions
- Bombs: 2,000 lb (907 kg) of bombs

== See also ==
Related development

- Hall PH

Aircraft of comparable role, configuration, and era

- Boeing XPB
- Short Singapore
- Short Sarafand
