= No. 461 Squadron RAAF =

Royal Australian Air Force squadron

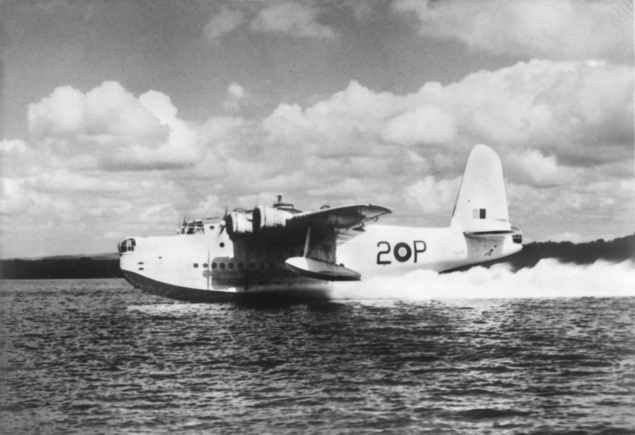
- A No. 461 Squadron Sunderland Mark V landing at Pembroke Dock, Wales in 1944
- Active: 25 April 1942 – 4 June 1945
- Disbanded: 4 June 1945
- Country: Australia
- Allegiance: United Kingdom
- Branch: Royal Australian Air Force
- Role: Maritime patrol
- Part of: No. 19 Group RAF, Coastal Command
- Motto(s): "They shall not pass unseen"
- Battle honours: Atlantic, 1939–1945; English Channel and North Sea, 1939–1945; Biscay Ports, 1940–1945; Normandy, 1944; Biscay, 1940–1945; Arctic, 1940–1945

Insignia
- Squadron Badge heraldry: A demi-shark couped, pierced by a harpoon
- Squadron Codes: UT (April 1942 – August 1943, July 1944 – June 1945)

Aircraft flown
- Patrol: Short Sunderland

No. 461 Squadron was a Royal Australian Air Force maritime patrol squadron during World War II which operated under Royal Air Force control flying in Europe and over the Atlantic. The squadron was formed in 1942 and was disbanded in mid-1945, just after the end of the war in Europe. Personnel were drawn from many countries of the British Empire, although the majority were Australians. Throughout the war, the squadron was credited with destroying a total of six German U-boats, and operated mainly in the Bay of Biscay and Atlantic.

== Squadron history ==
No. 461 Squadron was formed at RAF Mount Batten in Britain on 25 April 1942 as an anti-submarine squadron raised under an Article XV of the Empire Air Training Scheme. It was originally intended that the squadron would be equipped with Catalina flying boats, but it was equipped with Short Sunderland aircraft instead. After a period of training, the squadron began flying operational anti-submarine patrols over the Atlantic in July. While some of No. 461 Squadron's aircrew had previously served with No. 10 Squadron RAAF most of the aircrew were inexperienced and required further training and flight experience. No. 461 Squadron moved to Hamworthy in August 1942 and the next month it encountered its first U-boat. The engagement was not successful and although several U-boats were damaged the squadron was not successful in sinking any submarines during 1942. The squadron flew a number of transport flights to Gibraltar in October in support of Operation Torch.

During 1943, No. 461 Squadron mainly conducted daylight anti-submarine patrols over the Bay of Biscay, having moved to a new base at Pembroke Dock in April 1943. These patrols exposed the squadron's aircraft to frequent attacks by German fighters. The Sunderland aircraft were fitted with a heavy defensive armament, however, and were often successful in beating off fighter attacks. During 1943, the squadron sank a total of three U-boats. By May 1943, No. 461 Squadron was fully equipped with the more advanced Mark III Sunderland. This aircraft allowed the Squadron to operate at night. Equipped with these improved aircraft the squadron continued to fly anti-submarine patrols over the Atlantic, including patrols in support of the Allied landing in Normandy. The squadron sank three U-boats during 1944.

Following the liberation of France the numbers of German U-boats in the Atlantic declined and No. 461 Squadron made few contacts with the enemy between October 1944 and the end of the war; between September and October 1944 a detachment from the squadron operated over Norwegian waters from a base in the Shetland Islands. No. 461 Squadron was disbanded at Pembroke Dock on 4 June 1945. The squadron lost 20 Sunderlands to enemy action and accidents. A total of 86 squadron members of all nationalities were killed on operations, including 64 Australians. The squadron was awarded six battle honours for its wartime service.

== U-boats destroyed ==
During the war No. 461 destroyed a total of six German U-boats. These were:

- U-332 (1 May 1943)
- U-461 (30 July 1943)
- U-106 (2 August 1943)
- U-571 (28 January 1944)
- U-385 (10 August 1944)
- U-270 (13 August 1944)

== Aircraft operated ==
Aircraft operated by no. 461 Squadron RAAF, data from
From	To	Aircraft	Version
April 1942	May 1943	Short Sunderland	Mk.II
August 1942	June 1945	Short Sunderland	Mk.III
February 1945	June 1945	Short Sunderland	Mk.V

== Squadron bases ==
Bases and ports used by no. 461 Squadron RAAF, data from
From	To	Base	Remark
25 April 1942	31 August 1942	RAF Mount Batten, Devon	
31 August 1942	21 April 1943	RAF Hamworthy Junction, (Poole Harbour) Dorset	
21 April 1943	20 June 1945	RAF Pembroke Dock, Pembrokeshire, Wales	Det. at RAF Sullom Voe, Shetland Islands, Scotland, 28 September 1944 – 29 October 1944

== Commanding officers ==
Officers commanding no. 461 Squadron RAAF, data from
From	To	Name
May 1942	August 1942	Wing Commander N.A.R. Halliday
August 1942	January 1943	Wing Commander R.C.O. Lovelock
January 1943	February 1944	Wing Commander D.L.G. Douglas, DFC
February 1944	February 1945	Wing Commander J.M. Hampshire, DFC
February 1945	June 1945	Wing Commander R.R. Oldham
