= No. 209 Squadron RAF =

Defunct flying squadron of the Royal Air Force

No. 209 (Hong Kong) Squadron RAF
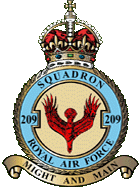
- Official squadron badge of No. 209 Squadron RAF
- Active: Royal Naval Air Service; 1 February 1917 – 1 April 1918; Royal Air Force; 1 April 1918 – 24 June 1919 (); 15 January 1930 – 1 January 1955; 1 November 1958 – 31 December 1968
- Country: United Kingdom
- Branch: Royal Air Force
- Role: Ground support (World War I); Maritime patrol (World War II & Korea); Liaison and transport (Malaya)
- Nickname: Hong Kong
- Mottos: Might and Main
- Battle honours: Western Front (1917–1918); Ypres (1917); Somme (1918); Channel and North Sea (1939); Atlantic (1939–1941); Bismarck; Eastern Waters (1942–1945); Arctic (1941–1942); Korea (1950–1953); *Honours marked with an asterisk are those emblazoned on the Squadron Standard

Insignia
- Squadron Badge heraldry: An eagle volant recursant descendant in pale, wings overture The red eagle was chosen due to the squadron getting credit for shooting down Manfred von Richthofen (the Red Baron). Approved by King George VI in August 1941.
- Squadron Codes: FK; WQ (Sep 1939 – Mar 1942; 1950 – 1951)

Number 209 Squadron of the British Royal Air Force was originally formed from a nucleus of "Naval Eight" on 1 February 1917 at Saint-Pol-sur-Mer, France, as No. 9 Squadron Royal Naval Air Service (RNAS) and saw active service in both World Wars, the Korean War and in Malaya. The use of the squadron number ceased in 1968 and it has not been reused since by an RAF squadron. The number, badge and motto is in service within the RAF Air Cadets at 209 (West Bridgford) Squadron ATC in Nottinghamshire.

== History ==
=== Formation and World War I ===
The Squadron was formed as a Royal Air Force Squadron on 1 April 1918, from No. 9 Squadron, Royal Naval Air Service at Clairmarais aerodrome. (All former RNAS squadrons were renumbered by the addition of 200 to their RNAS number.) During the remainder of World War I, 209 Squadron flew Sopwith Camels over the Western Front on fighter and ground support missions. The Squadron badge, the falling red eagle, symbolizes the destruction of Baron Manfred von Richthofen (commonly known as The Red Baron) who, in the 1914–1918 War, was credited to the guns of a pilot, Roy Brown from No. 209 Squadron. On 21 January 1919, the squadron was reduced to a skeleton organisation and disbanded in the UK on 24 June 1919 at RAF Scopwick, Lincolnshire.

=== The interbellum ===
No. 209 reformed at the flying boat base at RAF Mount Batten, Plymouth on 15 January 1930. It was first equipped with Blackburn Iris flying boats and then from January 1934 by Blackburn Perth but neither of these types were built in sufficient quantities to equip the squadron fully. In July 1936, however, the squadron was fully equipped with Short Singapore Mk.IIIs and it was transferred to RAF Kalafrana, Malta in September 1937 for three months. In December 1938, No 209 began to convert to yet another flying boat type, the Supermarine Stranraer.

=== World War II ===
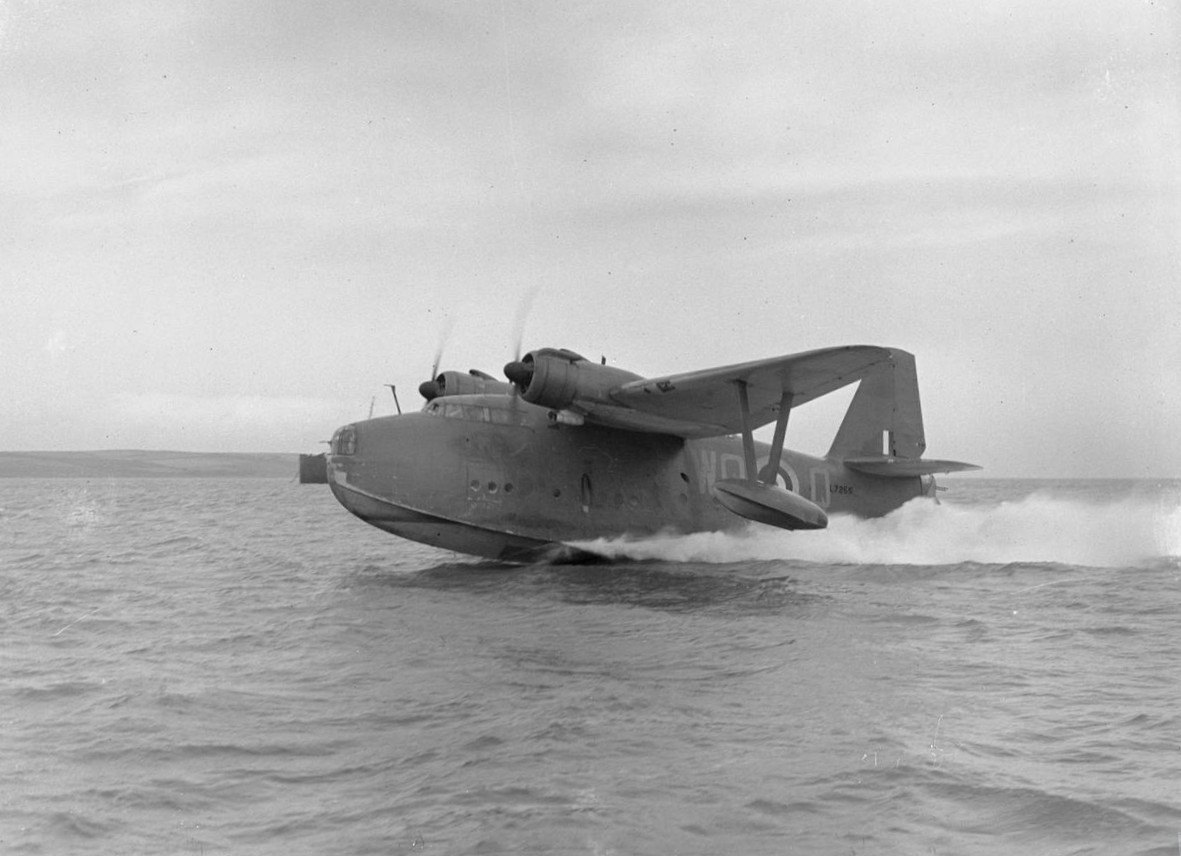
Lerwick L7265, ‘WQ-Q’ of 209 Squadron. Taking off from Loch Ryan, March 1941

When the Second World War broke out, No.209 moved to Invergordon to patrol the North Sea between Scotland and Norway. From October 1939 it patrolled the Atlantic from Oban. Two further re-equipments occurred, in December 1939 (Saro Lerwicks) and then in April 1941 (Consolidated Catalinas). Familiarisation with the U.S. supplied Catalinas was aided by the secondment of U.S. military personnel who also flew on active service patrols, despite the U.S. being a neutral power at the time. Anti-submarine patrols were flown over the Atlantic from RAF Castle Archdale on Lough Erne, in Northern Ireland, using the Donegal Corridor over neutral Eire. During this time, in May 1941, a patrol by No. 209 (with an American crewman) located the German battleship Bismarck.

In August 1941, the squadron moved to Iceland for two months. From March 1942 until July 1945, No.209 was stationed in East Africa. It flew patrols over the Indian Ocean with detached bases in South Africa, Madagascar, Oman and the Seychelles to extend its cover. In July 1945 the squadron moved to Ceylon (now Sri Lanka), with recently acquired Short Sunderland MkVs, with a detachment at Rangoon (now Yangon), to harass Japanese shipping along the coast from Burma (now Myanmar) to Malaya.

=== Post war ===
==== Hong Kong and Seletar ====
After the Japanese surrender in August 1945, a detachment was sent to Hong Kong in September, followed by the rest of the squadron in October. In April 1946 the squadron moved to Singapore. A detachment remained at RAF Kai Tak and became No.1430 flight and then No.88 Squadron. The squadron headquarters was established at RAF Seletar (sometimes referred to as "Seltar"), on Singapore Island on 18 May 1946 and No.209 and was named "City of Hong Kong" Squadron on 23 January 1947.

==== To Korea ====
Operation Firedog missions during the Malayan Emergency began on 7 July 1948. In September 1950, during the Korean War, the aircraft were moved to Iwakuni, Yamaguchi, Japan to patrol off the Korean coast from 15 September. On 1 January 1955 the squadron merged with No. 205 Squadron.

==== With Pioneers in the transport role ====
On 1 November 1958 No. 267 Squadron at RAF Kuala Lumpur was renumbered 209 Squadron and flew Scottish Aviation Pioneers and Scottish Aviation Twin Pioneers on liaison and transport duties in Malaysia. No.209 Squadron was finally disbanded on 31 December 1968 at RAF Seletar.

=== Notable personnel ===
- Fred Everest Banbury – 1917–1918 with No. 9 Naval Squadron
- Arthur Roy Brown
- Stearne Tighe Edwards
- Air chief marshal Robert Foster – 1918
- John Hales
- Oliver Colin LeBoutillier
- Wilfrid May
- Air vice-marshal Francis Mellersh
- John Paynter – 1917 with No. 9
- Oliver Redgate – 1917–1918
- Merrill Samuel Taylor – 1917–1918 with No. 9 and No. 209

== Aircraft operated ==
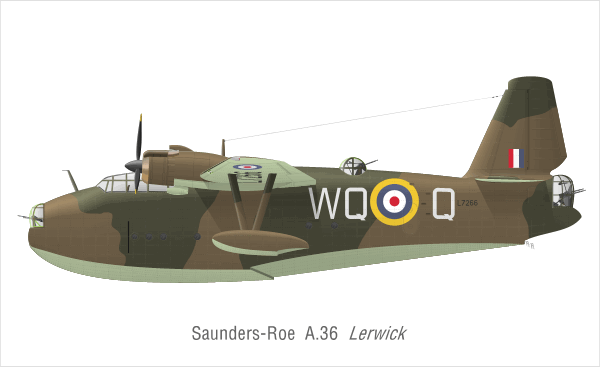
A Saro Lerwick in the markings of No. 209 squadron RAF

Aircraft operated by no. 9 Squadron RNAS or No. 209 Squadron RAF, data from
From	To	Aircraft	Version
February 1917	June 1917	Nieuport 17	
February 1917	July 1917	Sopwith Pup	
February 1917	July 1917	Sopwith Triplane	
July 1917	February 1919	Sopwith Camel	
January 1930	December 1932	Blackburn Iris	Mk. III
February 1932	July 1932	Saro A.7	
June 1932	June 1934	Blackburn Iris	Mk. V
August 1932	November 1932	Short Singapore	Mk.II
February 1933	June 1934	Supermarine Southampton	Mk.II
January 1934	December 1934	Blackburn Perth	
October 1934	November 1934	Supermarine Southampton	Mk.II
October 1934	November 1934	Saro London	Mk.I
December 1934	August 1935	Supermarine Scapa	
January 1935	February 1935	Supermarine Southampton	Mk.II
January 1935	February 1936	Saro London	Mk.I
February 1935	September 1935	Supermarine Stranraer	Mk.I
April 1935	September 1935	Short Knuckleduster	
July 1935	May 1936	Blackburn Perth	
January 1936	July 1936	Supermarine Southampton	Mk.II
February 1936	April 1939	Short Singapore	Mk.III
November 1938	April 1940	Supermarine Stranraer	Mk.I
December 1939	April 1941	Saro Lerwick	Mk.I
April 1941	April 1945	Consolidated Catalina	Mks.I
July 1942	April 1945	Consolidated Catalina	Mk.IIa
February 1945	December 1954	Short Sunderland	GR.5
November 1958	March 1959	Auster AOP	6
November 1958	November 1959	Douglas Dakota	C.4
November 1958	February 1960	Percival Pembroke	C.1
November 1958	December 1968	Scottish Aviation Pioneer	CC.1
March 1959	December 1968	Scottish Aviation Twin Pioneer	CC.1
October 1960	December 1968	Scottish Aviation Twin Pioneer	CC.2

== Squadron bases ==
Bases and airfields used by no. 9 Squadron RNAS or No. 209 Squadron RAF, data from
From	To	Base	Remark
1 February 1917	15 May 1917	Saint-Pol-sur-Mer, France	
15 May 1917	15 June 1917	Veurne (Furnes), Belgium	
15 June 1917	5 July 1917	Flez-Cuzy, France	
5 July 1917	10 July 1917	Izel-lès-Hameau, France	
10 July 1917	25 July 1917	Bray-Dunes, France	Frontier Aerodrome
25 July 1917	28 September 1917	Leffrinckoucke, France	
28 September 1917	10 October 1917	Bray-Dunes, France	Frontier Aerodrome
10 October 1917	16 February 1918	Bray-Dunes, France	Middle Aerodrome
16 February 1918	20 March 1918	RNAS Dover, Kent	Guston Road
20 March 1918	23 March 1918	Bray-Dunes, France	Middle Aerodrome
23 March 1918	27 March 1918	Cappelle-la-Grande, France	
27 March 1918	29 March 1918	Bailleul, France	Asylum Ground
29 March 1918	7 April 1918	Clairmarais-North, France	
7 April 1918	20 July 1918	Bertangles, France	
20 July 1918	6 August 1918	Quelmes, France	
6 August 1918	14 August 1918	Bertangles, France	
14 August 1918	24 October 1918	Izel-lès-Hameau, France	
24 October 1918	22 November 1918	Bruille-lez-Marchiennes, France	
22 November 1918	11 December 1918	Saultain, France	
11 December 1918	14 February 1919	Froidmont, Belgium	
14 February 1919	24 June 1919	RAF Scopwick, Lincolnshire	
15 January 1930	1 May 1935	RAF Mount Batten, Devon	
1 May 1935	22 September 1937	RAF Felixstowe, Suffolk	
22 September 1937	31 September 1937	RAF Kalafrana, Malta	
31 September 1937	17 December 1937	Arzew, Algeria	
17 December 1937	27 September 1938	RAF Felixstowe, Suffolk	
27 September 1938	8 October 1938	RAF Invergordon, Ross and Cromarty, Scotland	
8 October 1938	22 May 1939	RAF Felixstowe, Suffolk	
22 May 1939	17 June 1939	RAF Stranraer, Wigtownshire	
17 June 1939	12 August 1939	RAF Felixstowe, Suffolk	
12 August 1939	22 August 1939	RAF Invergordon, Ross and Cromarty, Scotland	Dets. at Sullom Voe, Shetland, Scotland and Falmouth, Cornwall
22 August 1939	30 August 1939	RAF Felixstowe, Suffolk	
30 August 1939	7 October 1939	RAF Invergordon, Ross and Cromarty, Scotland	
7 October 1939	12 July 1940	RAF Oban, Argyll and Bute, Scotland	Det. at Falmouth, Cornwall
12 July 1940	3 January 1941	RAF Pembroke Dock, Pembrokeshire, Wales	Det. at RAF Stranraer, Wigtownshire
3 January 1941	23 March 1941	RAF Stranraer, Wigtownshire	
23 March 1941	26 July 1941	RAF Castle Archdale	(Lough Erne)
26 July 1941	10 October 1941	RAF Reykjavik, Iceland	
10 October 1941	30 March 1942	RAF Pembroke Dock, Pembrokeshire, Wales	
30 March 1942	15 June 1942	En route to East Africa	
15 June 1942	21 July 1945	Kipevu, Kenya	Dets. at Kisumu, Kenya; Kilindini, Kenya; RAF Khormaksar, Aden; Masirah, Oman; Congella, South Africa; Seychelles and Diego Suarez, Madagascar
21 July 1945	17 September 1945	RAF Koggala, Ceylon	
17 September 1945	28 April 1946	RAF Kai Tak, Hong Kong	
28 April 1946	1 January 1955	RAF Seletar, Singapore	
18 May 1946	5 August 1946	RAF Kai Tak, Hong Kong	Detachment
11 September 1950	18 December 1950	Iwakuni, Yamaguchi, Japan	Detachment
1 November 1958	1 October 1959	RAF Kuala Lumpur, Singapore	Det. at Penang, Malaysia
1 October 1959	31 December 1968	RAF Seletar, Singapore	Dets. at Kuching, Labuan and Bayan Lepas in Malaysia

== See also ==
- List of Royal Air Force aircraft squadrons
