= Blackburn Sydney =

British flying boat

Sydney
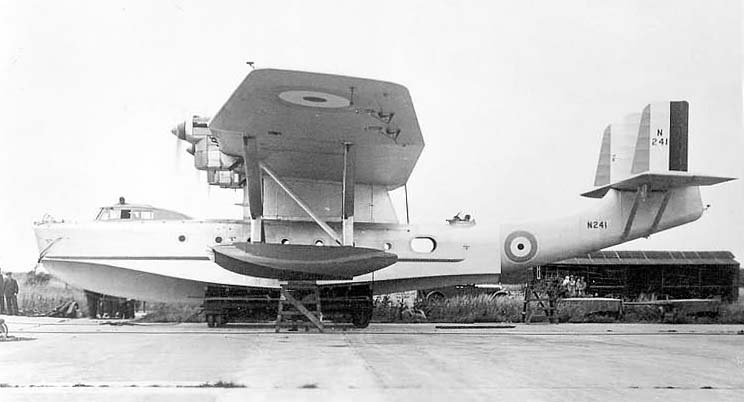

General information
- Type: Patrol flying boat
- Manufacturer: Blackburn
- Designer: John Douglas Rennie
- Status: Prototype
- Number built: 1

History
- First flight: 18 July 1930

The Blackburn R.B.2 Sydney (serial N241) was a long-range maritime patrol flying boat developed for the Royal Air Force in 1930 in response to Air Ministry Specification R.5/27. It was a parasol-winged braced monoplane with a typical flying boat configuration, featuring triple tailfins and three engines mounted on the wing's leading edge. After evaluation, it was not ordered into production, and no further examples were built.

With development of the Sydney abandoned, the construction of a cargo-carrying variant powered by radial engines, the C.B.2 Nile, was also discontinued.

== Specifications (Sydney) ==
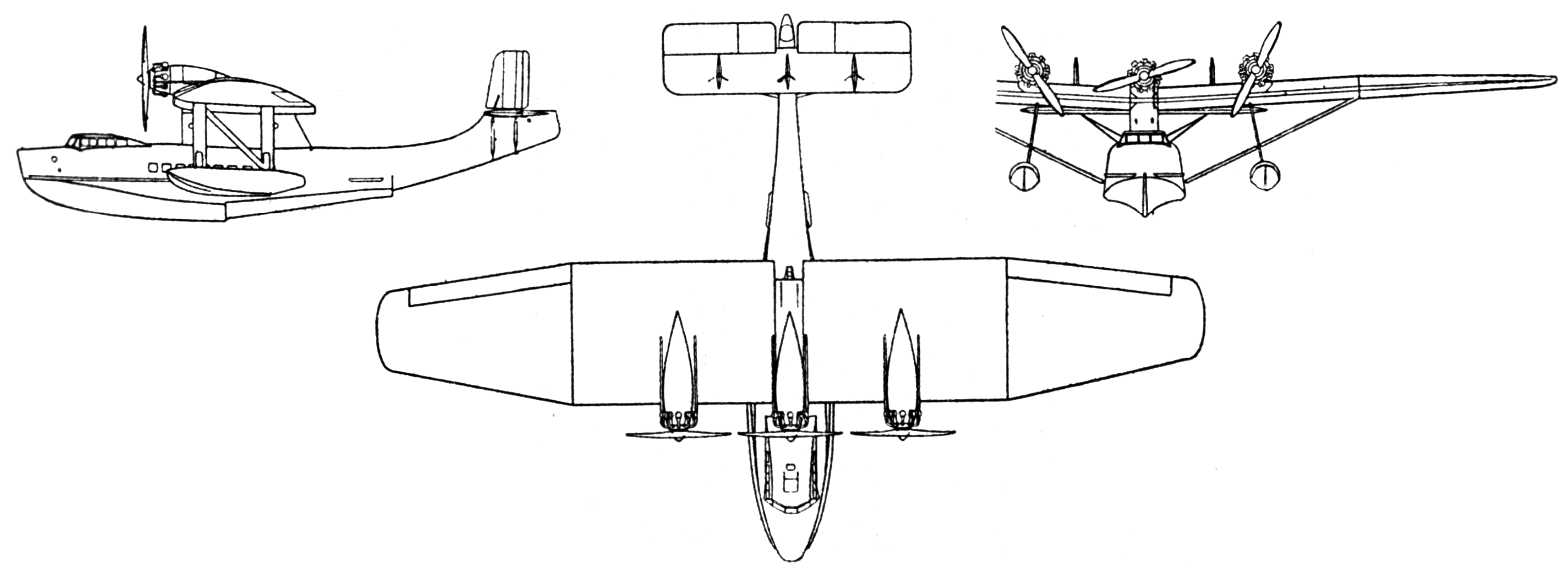
Blackburn Nile 3-view drawing from L'Aéronautique August,1929

Data from British Flying Boats

General characteristics

- Crew: 5
- Length: 65 ft 7 in (19.99 m)
- Wingspan: 100 ft (30 m)
- Height: 20 ft 4 in (6.20 m)
- Wing area: 1,500 sq ft (140 m^{2})
- Empty weight: 17,065 lb (7,741 kg)
- Gross weight: 23,350 lb (10,591 kg)
- Powerplant: 3 × Rolls-Royce F.XII MS V-12 liquid-cooled piston engines, 525 hp (391 kW) each
- Propellers: 2-bladed fixed-pitch propellers

Performance

- Maximum speed: 123 mph (198 km/h, 107 kn)
- Cruise speed: 100 mph (160 km/h, 87 kn)
- Endurance: 7 hours 30 minutes
- Service ceiling: 16,300 ft (5,000 m)
- Rate of climb: 390 ft/min (2.0 m/s)

Armament

- Guns: 3 × trainable .303 in (7.7 mm) Lewis Gun in open bow, dorsal and ventral positions
- Bombs: 1,102 lb (500 kg) of bombs or 2 × torpedoes

== See also ==
Related development

- Blackburn Iris

Aircraft of comparable role, configuration, and era

- Blériot 5190
- Consolidated Commodore
- Consolidated P2Y
- Latécoère 340
- Loire 70
- SPCA 10
- Supermarine Air Yacht

Related lists

- List of flying boats and floatplanes
