= Short Singapore =

British multi-engined biplane flying boat

Singapore
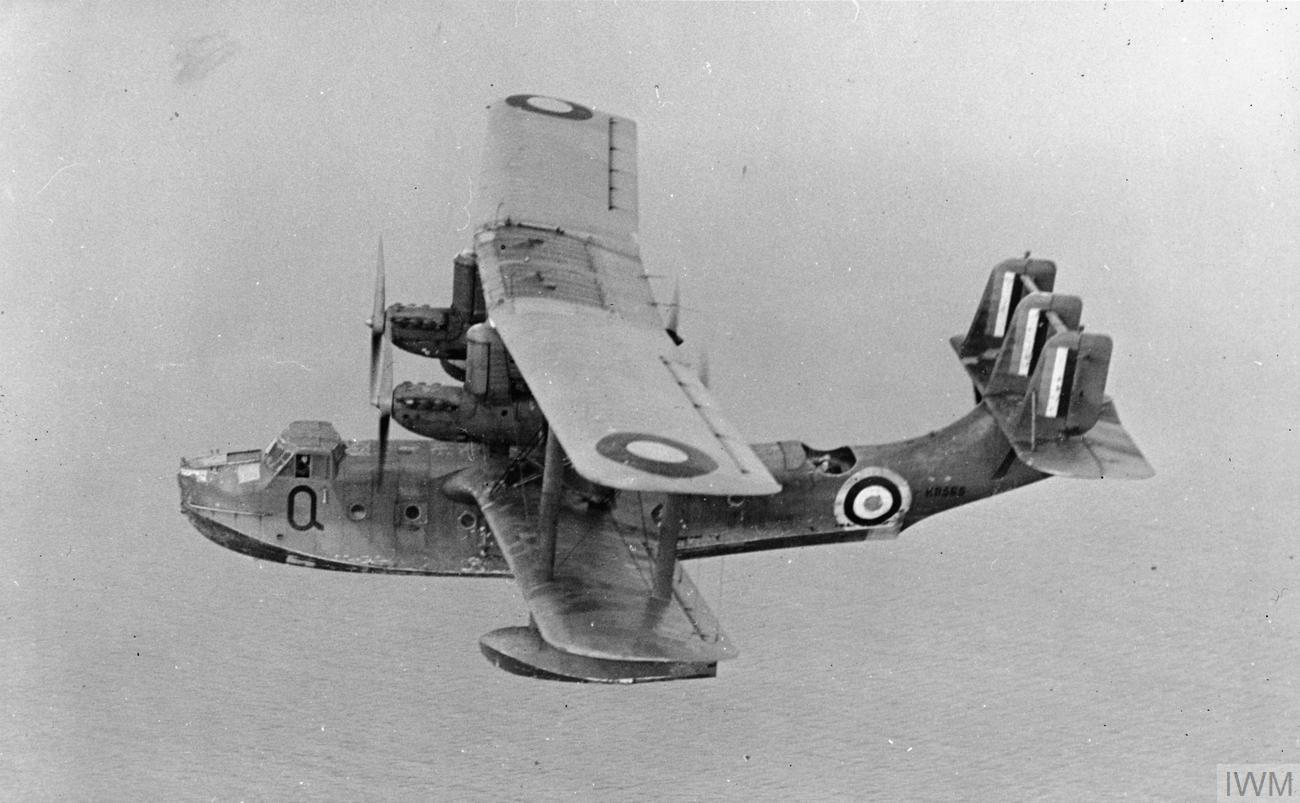
- Singapore Mark III, K8565 'Q'. of No. 4 (Coastal) Operational Training Unit, April 1941

General information
- Type: Military flying boat
- Manufacturer: Short Brothers
- Status: Phased out of service
- Primary users: Royal Air Force Royal New Zealand Air Force
- Number built: 37

History
- Manufactured: 1934–1937
- Introduction date: 1935
- First flight: 17 August 1926 (Mk.I) 15 June 1934 (Mk.III)
- Retired: Retired by RAF in 1941, last flight flown by RNZAF in 1942
- Developed from: Short Cromarty

The Short Singapore was a British multi-engined biplane flying boat built after the First World War. The design was developed into two four-engined versions: the prototype Singapore II and production Singapore III. The latter became the Royal Air Force's main long-range maritime patrol flying boat of the 1930s and saw service against the Japanese with the Royal New Zealand Air Force during the Second World War.

== Design and development ==
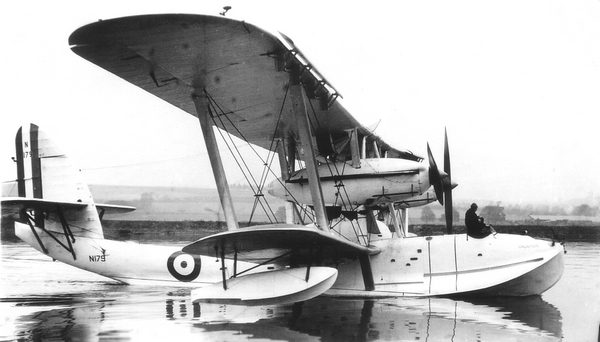
Short Singapore I prototype (N179) in its final form, with Rolls-Royce H.10 Buzzard engines and Handley Page auto-slots on the upper wings.

The first prototype of the Short Singapore, also known as the Short S.5 (military designation Singapore I), was a metal hull version of the wooden-hulled Short Cromarty. The biplane design included a single fin and rudder, and was originally powered by two Rolls-Royce Condor IIIA 650 horsepower (480 kW) engines. Its maiden flight was made from Rochester on 17 August 1926, piloted by Short's Chief Test Pilot John Lankester Parker. The type did not enter production, but was used by Sir Alan Cobham for a survey flight around Africa. Registered G-EBUP, it left Rochester on 17 November 1927 and arrived at the Cape on 30 March 1928, returning to Rochester on 4 June 1928. It was displayed at the Olympia in July 1929.

Short Singapore II prototype (N246) early in its development, with four engines, single tail, open cockpit and no ailerons on the lower wings.

The Singapore II (manufacturer's designation Short S.12) which followed was a development of the Singapore I with four engines, mounted in tandem tractor/pusher pairs (also known as the push-pull configuration). The single example of this aircraft to be built was first flown on 27 March 1930, also by John Lankester Parker.

From the Singapore II came a design with four engines and triple fins. In 1933 the British Air Ministry ordered four flying boats based on the Singapore II for trials with squadrons under specification R.3/33. These would be followed by a further production order to specification R.14/34. These aircraft, the Singapore III (manufacturer's designation Short S.19), had all-metal hulls and fabric-covered metal flying surfaces. They were powered by four 675 hp (503 kW) Rolls-Royce Kestrel IX mounted between the wings in two tandem push-pull pairs, similar to the Singapore IIs. The crew of six was located in a central cabin and fore, aft, and midships open gun positions (Vickers machine gun or Lewis gun). A long-range fuel tank could be carried externally on the dorsal hull. The first Singapore III flew on 15 June 1934. Although obsolescent by the time the first aircraft entered service with 210 Squadron in January 1935, the type arrived just in time to benefit from the arms race of the late 1930s and 37 were built. Production terminated in June 1937.

== Operational history ==
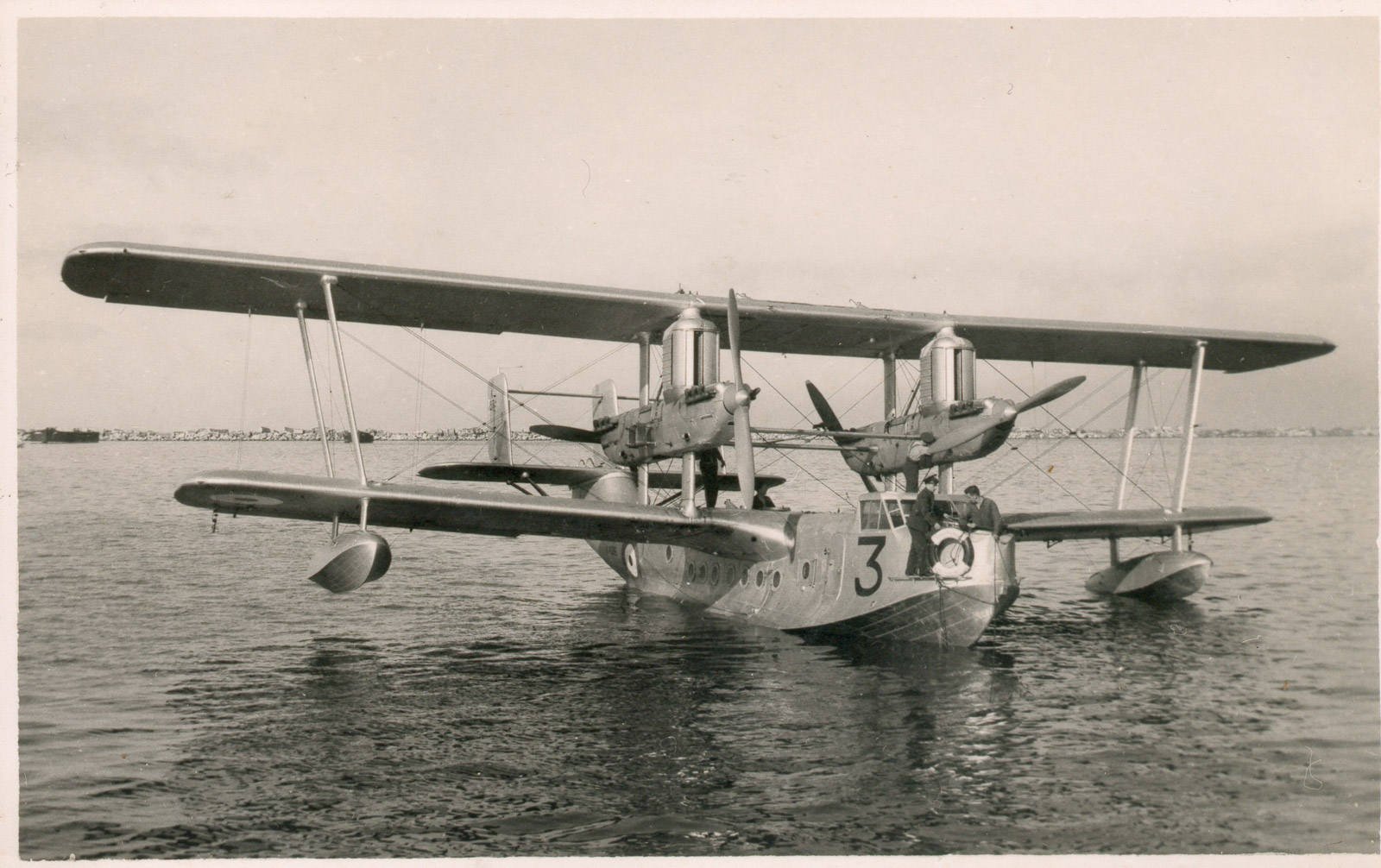
Short Singapore III flying boat of 230 Squadron at Alexandria, mid-1930s.

230 Squadron was the first squadron equipped with Singapore IIIs. It was posted to Alexandria in 1935. During 1937 the Singapores of 209 Squadron and 210 Squadron moved from RAF Kalafrana in Malta to Algeria as part of an international effort to prevent gun running during the Spanish Civil War.

Replacement of the Singapore with the Short Sunderland was well underway by the outbreak of the Second World War, but 19 survivors saw limited service in secondary theatres, mainly in a training role. The last RAF unit operating the type was No. 205 Squadron RAF in Singapore which relinquished its aircraft in October 1941. Four 205 squadron aircraft found their way to No. 5 Squadron RNZAF in Fiji, for use against German raiders. When Japan attacked in December, the New Zealand aircraft found themselves in the front line. They accounted for a Japanese submarine and conducted several air-sea rescues before being replaced by the Consolidated Catalinas from No. 6 Squadron RNZAF in April 1943.

== Survivors ==
None are known to have survived.

== Variants ==
Short S.5 / Singapore I
First design aircraft powered by two Rolls-Royce Condor IIIA engines (665 hp), one aircraft built.

Short S.12 / Singapore II
A development of the Singapore I powered by four engines, single example built.

Short S.19 / Singapore III
A development of the Singapore II powered by four Rolls-Royce Kestrel IX engines and equipped with triple fins. 37 were built.

== Operators ==
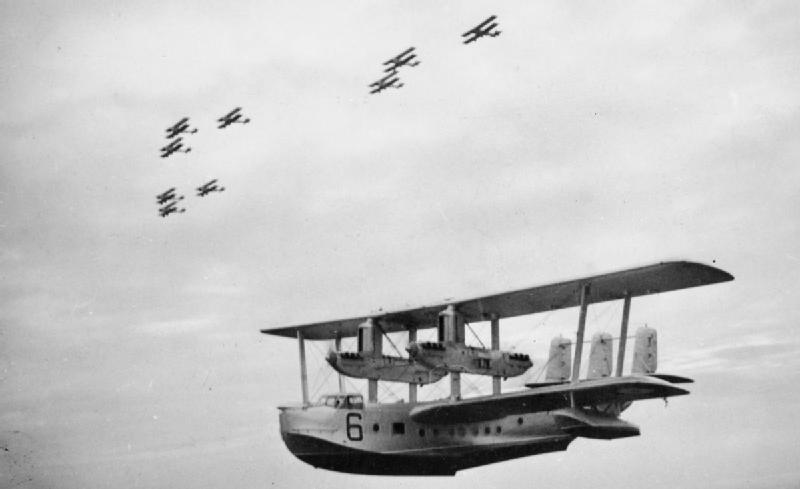
Short Singapore III flying boat of 205 Squadron, in flight below three 'vic' formations of Vickers Vildebeest torpedo bombers of 100 Squadron. Both units were based at RAF Seletar.

New Zealand

- Royal New Zealand Air Force
  - No. 5 Squadron RNZAF (four aircraft transferred from 205 Squadron Royal Air Force from October 1941)

United Kingdom

- Royal Air Force
  - No. 203 Squadron RAF Singapore III based at Pembroke Dock and Iraq (1935-1940)
  - No. 205 Squadron RAF Singapore III based at Singapore (1935-1941)
  - No. 209 Squadron RAF Singapore III based at (mostly) Felixstowe (1932 - 1939)
  - No. 210 Squadron RAF Singapore III based at Pembroke Dock (1934-1938)
  - No. 228 Squadron RAF Singapore III based at Pembroke Dock (1937)
  - No. 230 Squadron RAF Singapore III based at Pembroke Dock, Egypt, then Singapore and Ceylon (1935-1938)
  - No. 240 Squadron RAF Singapore III based at Calshot (1938-1939)

== Accidents and incidents ==
- 15 February 1935 - Singapore III K3595 crashed in the Peloritani mountain range near Messina, Sicily in poor visibility. All on board were killed - eight RAF personnel and a civilian Senior Technical Officer of the Royal Aircraft Establishment. The aircraft was one of four that had departed from the United Kingdom four weeks earlier for delivery to No. 205 Squadron RAF, based in Singapore. However the flight had been repeatedly delayed by engine trouble and illness among the crew. One of the victims of the crash was Flight Lieutenant Henry Longfield Beatty, the half-brother of The First Sea Lord David Beatty, 1st Earl Beatty. They were buried at Capuccini Naval Cemetery, Malta.
- 2 February 1937 - Singapore III K3594 crashed during take-off from RAF Seletar, Singapore. One pilot was killed, the other five crew were injured. The aircraft was written-off.
- 8 August 1939 - Singapore III K4584 of No. 203 Squadron RAF struck a sea-wall during take-off from RAF Aboukir, Alexandria, Egypt; two were killed and seven injured, one of whom later died from his injuries. The aircraft caught fire and was written-off. One of those injured in the accident was Squadron Leader James Scarlett-Streatfeild (later Air-Vice Marshal)

== Specifications (Singapore III) ==
Data from Singapore: Short's Last Biplane Boat

General characteristics

- Crew: 6–7
- Length: 64 ft 2 in (19.56 m)
- Wingspan: 90 ft 0 in (27.43 m)
- Height: 23 ft 6 in (7.16 m)
- Wing area: 1,465 sq ft (136.1 m^{2})
- Empty weight: 20,364 lb (9,237 kg)
- Gross weight: 28,160 lb (12,773 kg) (normal weight)
- Max takeoff weight: 32,390 lb (14,692 kg) (max overload)
- Fuel capacity: 786 imp gal (944 US gal; 3,570 L) normal, 1,266 imp gal (1,520 US gal; 5,760 L) overload
- Powerplant: 4 × Rolls-Royce Kestrel VIII/IX liquid-cooled V12 engines (tandem configuration), 610 hp (450 kW) (derated) - at 4,500 ft (1,400 m) each

Performance

- Maximum speed: 136 mph (219 km/h, 118 kn) at 5,000 ft (1,520 m) and normal weight
- Cruise speed: 104 mph (167 km/h, 90 kn) (econ. cruise, max weight)
- Range: 1,000 mi (1,600 km, 870 nmi)
- Endurance: 11.9 hr (at econ cruise)
- Service ceiling: 14,800 ft (4,500 m)
- Time to altitude: 7 min to 5,000 ft (1,520 m)

Armament

- Guns: 3× 0.303 in (7.7 mm) Lewis guns in nose, waist and tail positions
- Bombs: Up to 1,100 pounds (500 kg) of bombs under wings

== See also ==
Related development

- Short S.2
- Short Cromarty
- Short Calcutta
- Short Sarafand

Aircraft of comparable role, configuration, and era

- Hall XP2H
- Blackburn Perth

Related lists

- List of aircraft of World War II
- List of aircraft of the Royal Air Force
- List of flying boats and floatplanes
