= No. 240 Squadron RAF =

Defunct flying squadron of the Royal Air Force

- Active: 20 Aug 1918 - 15 May 1919; 30 Mar 1937 - 31 May 1946; 1 May 1952 - 1 Nov 1958; 1 Aug 1959 – 8 Jan 1963
- Country: United Kingdom
- Branch: Royal Air Force
- Role: Anti-submarine warfare Maritime patrol Strategic Missile Force
- Mottos: Icelandic: Sjo-Vordur Lopt-Vordur (Translation: "Guardian of the sea, guardian of the sky")

Insignia
- Squadron Badge heraldry: A viking helmet
- Squadron Codes: SH (Apr 1939 - Sep 1939); BN (Sep 1939 - Jun 1942); L (May 1952 - 1956); 240 (1956 - Nov 1958)

No. 240 Squadron RAF was a Royal Air Force flying boat and seaplane squadron during World War I, World War II and up to 1959. It was then reformed as a strategic missile squadron, serving thus till 1963.

== History ==
=== Formation and World War I ===
No. 240 Squadron of the Royal Air Force was formed at RAF Calshot on 20 August 1918 to provide anti-submarine protection, using its Short 184s seaplanes and Felixstowe F2A flying boats. It was disbanded on 15 May 1919.

=== Reformation and World War II ===
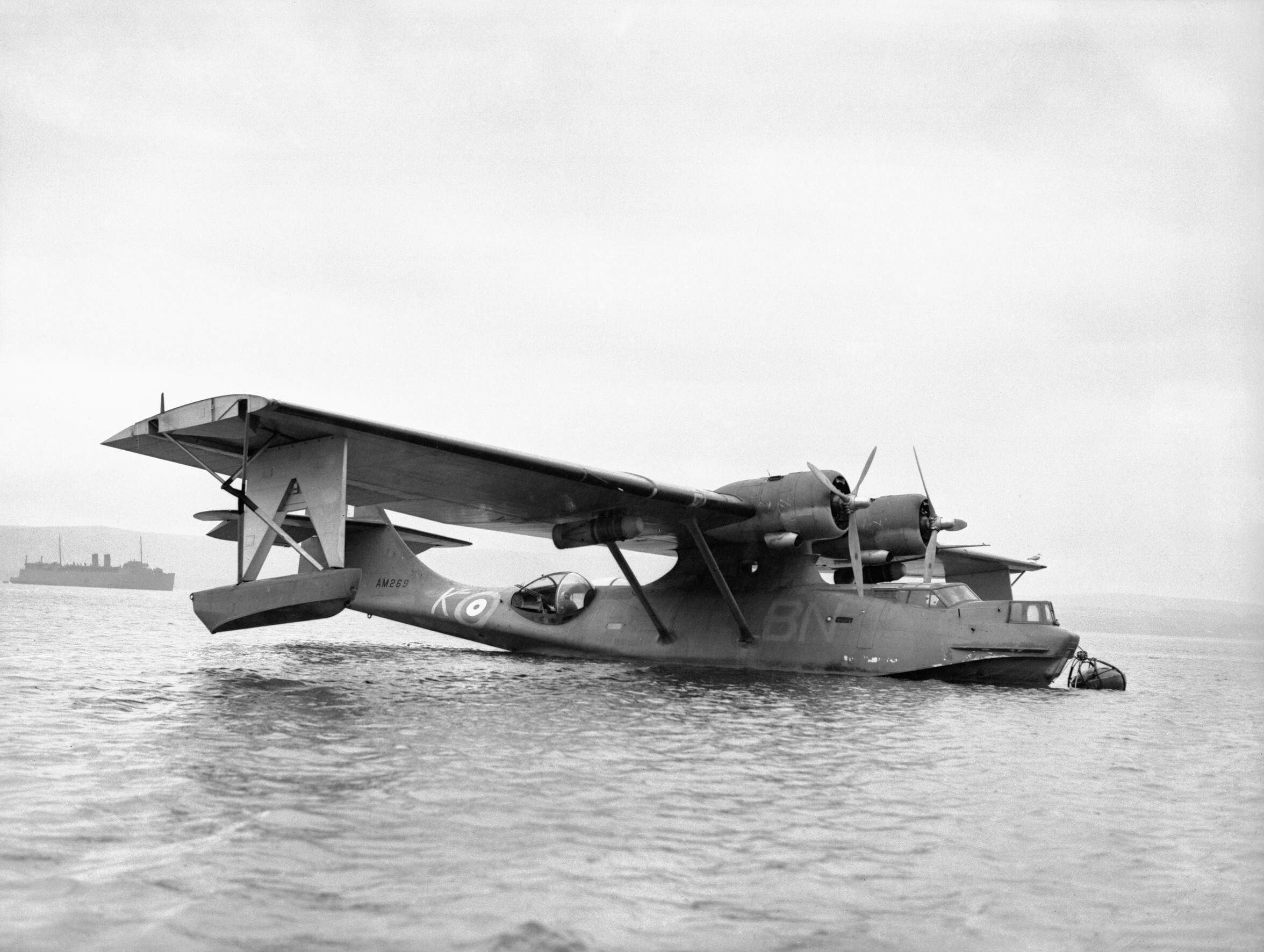
A Consolidated PBY Catalina of No 240 Squadron based at RAF Stranraer as seen in 1941

The squadron was re-formed at RAF Calshot on 30 March 1937. It was at initially equipped with Supermarine Scapas and after a year converted to Short Singapores, which were followed a year later by the Saro London, planning to convert later to Saro Lerwicks, but getting Supermarine Stranraers in June 1940 instead. During March 1941 these were replaced with Consolidated Catalinas, to carry out anti-submarine patrols over the Atlantic Ocean. It then moved to India in March 1942 where it flew anti-shipping and submarine patrols from Red Hills Lake, where it was disbanded on 1 July 1945. The squadron reformed that same day, 1 July 1945, from elements of 212 Squadron and 240 Squadron's Special Duties Flight. The squadron was continuing "special duties" into September 1945, evacuating Operation "Lunch" from the Andaman Islands on 7 September 1945. The squadron began converting to Short Sunderland Mk.Vs from 01 August 1945 before moving to Ceylon in January 1946, where it disbanded on 31 March 1946 at RAF Koggala.

=== Post war: Shackletons and Missiles ===
On 1 May 1952 the squadron re-formed again at RAF Aldergrove and was equipped with Avro Shackleton Mk.1a maritime reconnaissance aircraft. The squadron moved to Northern Ireland in June 1952, where it disbanded on 1 November 1958 at RAF Ballykelly by being renumbered to 203 sqn.

The squadron reformed once again on 1 August 1959, as one of 20 Thor Strategic Missile (SM) Squadrons, associated with Project Emily. The squadron was equipped with three Thor Intermediate range ballistic missiles, and stationed at RAF Breighton. In October 1962, during the Cuban Missile Crisis, the squadron was kept at full readiness, with the missiles aimed at strategic targets in the USSR. The squadron was disbanded with the termination of the Thor Programme in Great Britain, on 8 January 1963.

== Aircraft operated ==
Aircraft operated by No. 240 Squadron RAF
From	To	Aircraft	Variant
Aug 1918	May 1919	Curtiss H-12	
Aug 1918	May 1919	Fairey Campania	
Aug 1918	May 1919	Felixstowe F.2	a
Aug 1918	May 1919	Short 320	
Aug 1918	May 1919	Short Type 184	b
Mar 1937	Jan 1939	Supermarine Scapa	
Nov 1938	Jan 1939	Short Singapore	Mk.III
Jul 1939	Jun 1940	Saro London	Mk.II
Jun 1940	Jan 1941	Supermarine Stranraer	Mk.I
Mar 1941	Dec 1945	Consolidated Catalina	Mks.I, Ib & II
Jul 1945	Mar 1946	Short Sunderland	Mk.V
May 1952	Nov 1958	Avro Shackleton	MR.1a
Jul 1953	Aug 1954	Avro Shackleton	MR.2
Aug 1959	Jan 1963	Douglas Thor	SM.75

== Squadron bases ==
Bases and airfields used by No. 240 Squadron RAF
From	To	Base	Remarks
20 August 1918	15 May 1919	RAF Calshot, Hampshire	
30 March 1937	12 August 1939	RAF Calshot, Hampshire	
12 August 1939	4 November 1939	RAF Invergordon, Ross and Cromarty, Scotland	
4 November 1939	1 April 1940	RAF Sullom Voe, Shetland, Scotland	
1 April 1940	27 May 1940	RAF Invergordon, Ross and Cromarty, Scotland	
27 May 1940	30 July 1940	RAF Pembroke Dock, Pembrokeshire, Wales	
30 July 1940	28 March 1941	RAF Stranraer, Wigtownshire, Scotland	Also flying Stranraer
28 March 1941	25 August 1941	RAF Killadeas, County Fermanagh, Northern Ireland	
25 August 1941	6 June 1942	RAF Castle Archdale (Lower Lough Erne), County Fermanagh, Northern Ireland	Ground echelon left 29 March 1942
29 March 1942	4 July 1942	En route to British India	
4 July 1942	1 July 1945	RAF Red Hills Lake, Madras, British India	
1 July 1945	10 January 1946	RAF Red Hills Lake, Madras, British India	Reformation as Short Sunderland unit
10 January 1946	31 March 1946	RAF Koggala, Ceylon	
1 May 1952	25 May 1952	RAF Aldergrove, County Antrim, Northern Ireland	
25 May 1952	5 June 1952	RAF St Eval, Cornwall	
5 June 1952	1 November 1958	RAF Ballykelly, County Londonderry, Northern Ireland	
1 August 1959	8 January 1963	RAF Breighton, East Riding of Yorkshire	as No. 240 (SM) Squadron
