= RAF Felixstowe =

Former Royal Air Force station in Suffolk, England

RAF Felixstowe
- Felixstowe, Suffolk
- Aerial view, 1933.

Site information
- Type: Royal Air Force station
- Owner: Air Ministry
- Controlled by: Royal Air Force

Location
- Location within Suffolk RAF Felixstowe (the United Kingdom)
- Coordinates: 51.945°N 1.321°E

Site history
- In use: April 1918-April 1962
- Battles/wars: First World War; Second World War

Royal Air Force Felixstowe, or more simply RAF Felixstowe, was a Royal Air Force station located 2.7 miles (4.3 km) northeast of Harwich, Essex, England and 10.7 miles (17.2 km) southeast of Ipswich, Suffolk.

== History ==
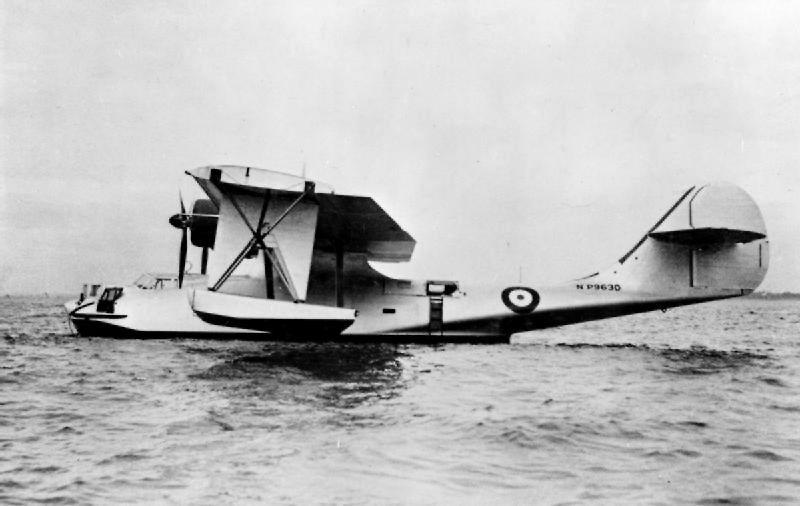
A Consolidated Model 28-5 (P96300), shortly after joining the Marine Aircraft Experimental Establishment for trials in July 1939.

Felixstowe was commissioned 5 August 1913 under the command of Captain C. E. Risk, RM, as Seaplanes, Felixstowe, followed by Lieutenant C. E. H. Rathborne, RN in 1914 and Lieutenant-Commander John Cyril Porte, RN in 1915. RNAS Felixstowe was created soon after the outbreak of World War I following the formation of the Royal Naval Air Service, 1 July 1914.

On formation of the Royal Air Force, 1 April 1918, the unit was renamed the Seaplane Experimental Station, Felixstowe, and disbanded in June 1919. 'C', 'D' and 'E' Boat Seaplane Training Flights were all formed on 8 August 1918, and were disbanded during 1919 with no known aircraft operated while at Felixstowe.

Felixstowe was home to the Marine Aircraft Experimental Establishment from 1 April 1924 until the Second World War. It was also the base of the Schneider Trophy racing team, the High Speed Flight, from 1 October 1926 until the British team won permanent possession of the trophy on 13 September 1931.

Notable members of the RAF based at Felixstowe included Frank Whittle, credited with the invention of the turbojet engine, and T. E. Lawrence, commonly known as Lawrence of Arabia.

RAF Felixstowe closed on 21 June 1962.

The following units were posted here:

- No. 22 Squadron RAF
- No. 209 Squadron RAF
- No. 210 Squadron RAF
- No. 230 Squadron RAF
- No. 231 Squadron RAF
- No. 232 Squadron RAF
- No. 247 Squadron RAF
- No. 4 (Communication) Squadron RAF
- No. 26 Air/Sea Rescue Marine Craft Unit RAF
- No. 33 Air/Sea Rescue Marine Craft Unit RAF
- 76th (Operations) Wing RAF
- No. 85 Maintenance Unit RAF
- No. 327 (Flying Boat) Flight RAF
- No. 328 (Flying Boat) Flight RAF
- No. 329 (Flying Boat) Flight RAF
- No. 330 (Flying Boat) Flight RAF
- No. 333 (Flying Boat) Flight RAF
- No. 334 (Flying Boat) Flight RAF
- No. 335 (Flying Boat) Flight RAF
- No. 336 (Flying Boat) Flight RAF
- No. 337 (Flying Boat) Flight RAF
- No. 339 (Flying Boat) Flight RAF
- No. 341 (Flying Boat) Flight RAF
- No. 442 (Seaplane) Coastal Flight RAF
- No. 1103 Marine Craft Base Unit RAF
- No. 1103 Marine Craft Unit RAF
- America School RAF
- Far East Flight RAF
- Flying Boat Development Flight RAF
- High Speed Flight RAF
- Marine Aircraft Experimental Establishment (MAEE)

== Current use ==
The site is now the Port of Felixstowe, with nothing remaining of the hangars, slipways and jetties.

The site of the former RAF Felixstowe Guardhouse is where 356 (Felixstowe) Squadron Air Training Corps is currently based, which is Felixstowe's local Royal Air Force Air Cadets Unit.

== See also ==
- List of former Royal Air Force stations
