= Marine Aircraft Experimental Establishment =

Coordinates: 51.9456°N 1.3210°E

The Marine Aircraft Experimental Establishment (MAEE) was a British military research and test organisation. It was originally formed as the Marine Aircraft Experimental Station in October 1918 at RAF Isle of Grain, a former Royal Naval Air Service seaplane base, to design, test and evaluate seaplanes, flying boats and other aircraft with a naval connection.

It was renamed as the Marine and Armament Experimental Establishment on 16 March 1920 to recognise that weapons and other equipment were evaluated as well as complete aircraft. It was renamed again on 1 March 1924 as the Marine Aircraft Experimental Establishment.

== Relocations ==
On 16 June 1924 the Establishment moved to the site of the former Seaplane Experimental Station seaplane base at Felixstowe. It carried out research and development work on water-based aircraft for service needs and also on their equipment and on air-sea rescue apparatus. The Establishment's work grew during its early years and by 1930 it was carrying out acceptance tests and trials on flying boats, seaplanes, and their associated equipment and armaments.

With the start of the Second World War the Establishment was moved to the more secure and safer location of Helensburgh in Scotland, and in 1940 was put under the control of the Ministry of Aircraft Production. In addition to its earlier functions the Establishment became responsible for acceptance tests and trials of air-sea rescue apparatus and equipment and for aircraft armament research with bombs, depth charges and projectiles, including experiments and tests in water tanks. Being the sole official experimental establishment for marine aircraft in the country, particular emphasis was placed on research, especially into seaworthiness, stability and control on water, and water impact loads.

In August 1945, the MAEE returned to Felixstowe, and soon after came under the Ministry of Supply, which was taking control of most military research establishments. Reduced interest in flying boats meant the link with the Royal Air Force ended in 1953, when flying ended. From then the Establishment was responsible for testing and evaluating prototype marine craft and air-sea rescue apparatus and associated equipment to determine whether they complied with the development specifications and to advise when they could be handed over for Service trials.

The MAEE was closed down in March 1956, its remaining activities being moved to the Air Ministry and the Aeroplane and Armament Experimental Establishment at Boscombe Down. The model workshop remained on site and came under the control of the Royal Aircraft Establishment, Farnborough.

== Sources ==
- Ray Sturtivant, RAF Flying Training and Support Units since 1912, Air-Britain (Historians), England, 2007, ISBN 0-85130-365-X

== See also ==
- Aeroplane & Armament Experimental Establishment, Martlesham Heath
- Port Victoria Marine Experimental Aircraft Depot
