= Avro =

British aircraft manufacturer

A.V. Roe and Company
- Type: Private
- Industry: manufacture of air and spacecraft and related machinery vehicle construction
- Founded: 1910 in Brownsfield Mill, Manchester, U.K.
- Founder: A.V. Roe; Humphrey Verdon Roe
- Defunct: 1963
- Fate: Merged with Hawker Siddeley Aircraft
- Successor: Hawker Siddeley Aviation
- Headquarters: Alexandra Park, Woodford, Stockport, United Kingdom
- Parent: Hawker Siddeley

Avro (an initialism of the founder's name, A.V. Roe) was a British aircraft manufacturer. Its designs include the Avro 504, used as a trainer in the First World War, the Avro Lancaster, one of the pre-eminent bombers of the Second World War, and the delta wing Avro Vulcan, a stalwart of the Cold War.

Avro was founded in 1910 by Alliott Verdon Roe at the Brownsfield Mill on Great Ancoats Street in Manchester. The company remained based primarily in Lancashire throughout its 53 years of existence, with key development and manufacturing sites in Alexandra Park, Chadderton, Trafford Park, and Woodford, Greater Manchester. The company was merged into Hawker Siddeley Aviation in 1963, although the Avro name has been used for some aircraft since then.

== History ==
=== Early history ===
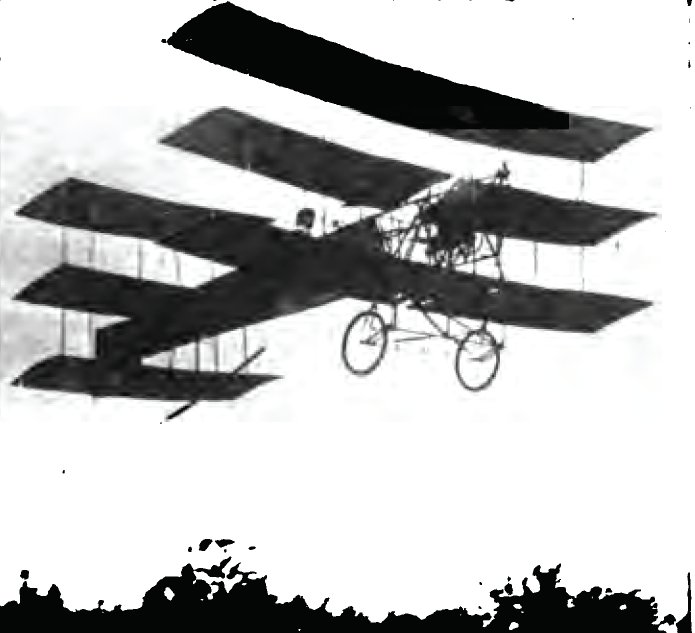
The A.V. Roe Type I Triplane, Roe's first successful aircraft

One of the world's first aircraft builders, A.V. Roe and Company was established on 1 January 1910 at Brownsfield Mill, Great Ancoats Street, Manchester, by Alliott Verdon Roe and his brother Humphrey Verdon Roe. Humphrey's contribution was chiefly financial and organizational; funding it from the earnings of the family webbing business and acting as managing director until he joined the RFC in 1917. Alliot had already constructed a successful aircraft, the Roe I Triplane, named The Bullseye after a brand of braces manufactured by Humphrey. The railway arch where A.V. Roe in 1909 built and achieved the first all-British powered flight still stands in the Lee Valley Park on the Walthamstow Marshes in north-east London. In 1911, Roy Chadwick began work as Alliott's personal assistant and the firm's draughtsman and, in 1918, he was appointed Chief Designer.

The first Avro aircraft to be produced in any quantity was the Avro E or Avro 500, first flown in March 1912, of which 18 were manufactured, most for the newly formed Royal Flying Corps. The company also built the world's first aircraft with enclosed crew accommodation in 1912, the monoplane Type F and the biplane Avro Type G in 1912, neither progressing beyond the prototype stage. The Type 500 was developed into the Avro 504, first flown in September 1913. A small number were bought by the War Office before the outbreak of World War I, and the type saw some front-line service in the early months of the war, but it is best known as a training aircraft, serving in that role until 1933. Production lasted 20 years and totalled 8,340 aircraft from several factories: Hamble, Failsworth, Miles Platting and Newton Heath.

=== Interwar years ===
After the boom in orders during the First World War, the lack of new work in peacetime caused severe financial problems and in August 1920, 68.5% of the company's shares were acquired by nearby Crossley Motors which had an urgent need for more factory space for automotive vehicle body building.

In 1924, the company left Alexandra Park Aerodrome in south Manchester where test flying had taken place since 1918; the site was used for a mixture of recreation and housing development. A rural site to the south of the city was found at New Hall Farm, Woodford in Cheshire, which continued to be used by aviation company BAE Systems until March 2011; the site has now been earmarked for a mixed use development.

In 1928 Crossley Motors sold AVRO to Armstrong Siddeley Holdings Ltd. In 1928 A.V. Roe resigned from the company he had founded and formed the Saunders-Roe company, which after World War II developed several radical designs for combat jets, and, eventually, a range of powerful hovercraft.

In 1935 Avro became a subsidiary of Hawker Siddeley.

=== Second World War ===
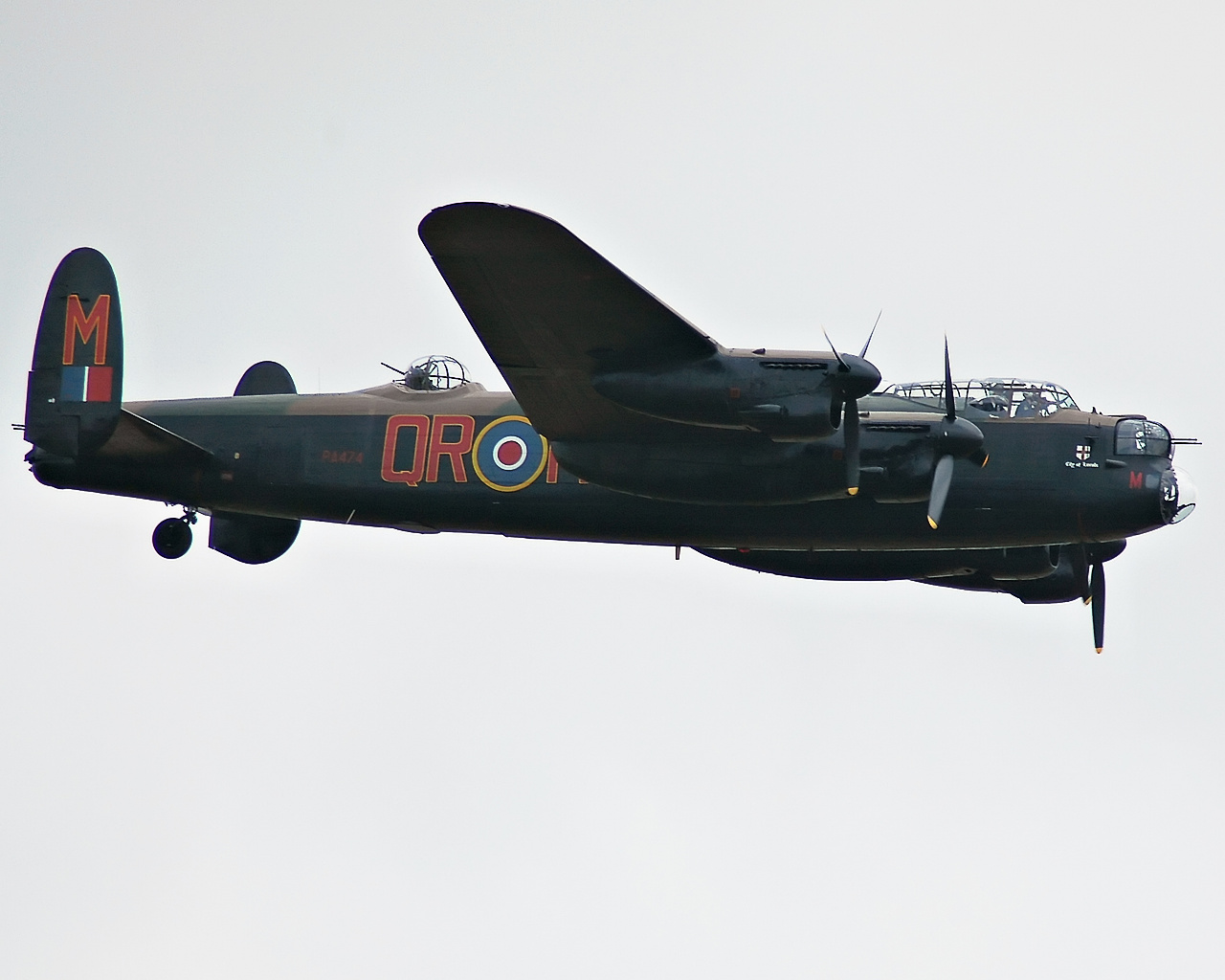
The Avro Lancaster

Maintaining their skills in designing trainer aircraft, the company built a more robust biplane called the Avro Tutor in the 1930s which the Royal Air Force (RAF) also bought in quantity. A twin piston-engined airliner called the Anson followed but as tensions rose again in Europe the firm's emphasis returned to combat aircraft. The Avro Manchester, Lancaster, and Lincoln were particularly famous Avro designs. Over 7,000 Lancasters were built and their bombing capabilities led to their use in the famous Dam Busters raid. Of the total, nearly half were built at Avro's Woodford (Stockport) and Chadderton (Oldham) sites, with some 700 Lancasters built at the Avro "shadow" factory next to Leeds Bradford Airport (formerly Yeadon Aerodrome), northwest Leeds. This factory employed 17,500 workers at a time when the population of Yeadon was just 10,000. It was the largest building in Europe at the time, at 1.5 million square feet (140,000 square metres), and its roof was disguised by the addition of fields and hedges to hide it from enemy planes. The old taxiway from the factory to the runway is still evident.

The Avro Lancaster carried the heaviest bomb loads of the war, including the Grand Slam bomb.

=== Postwar developments ===
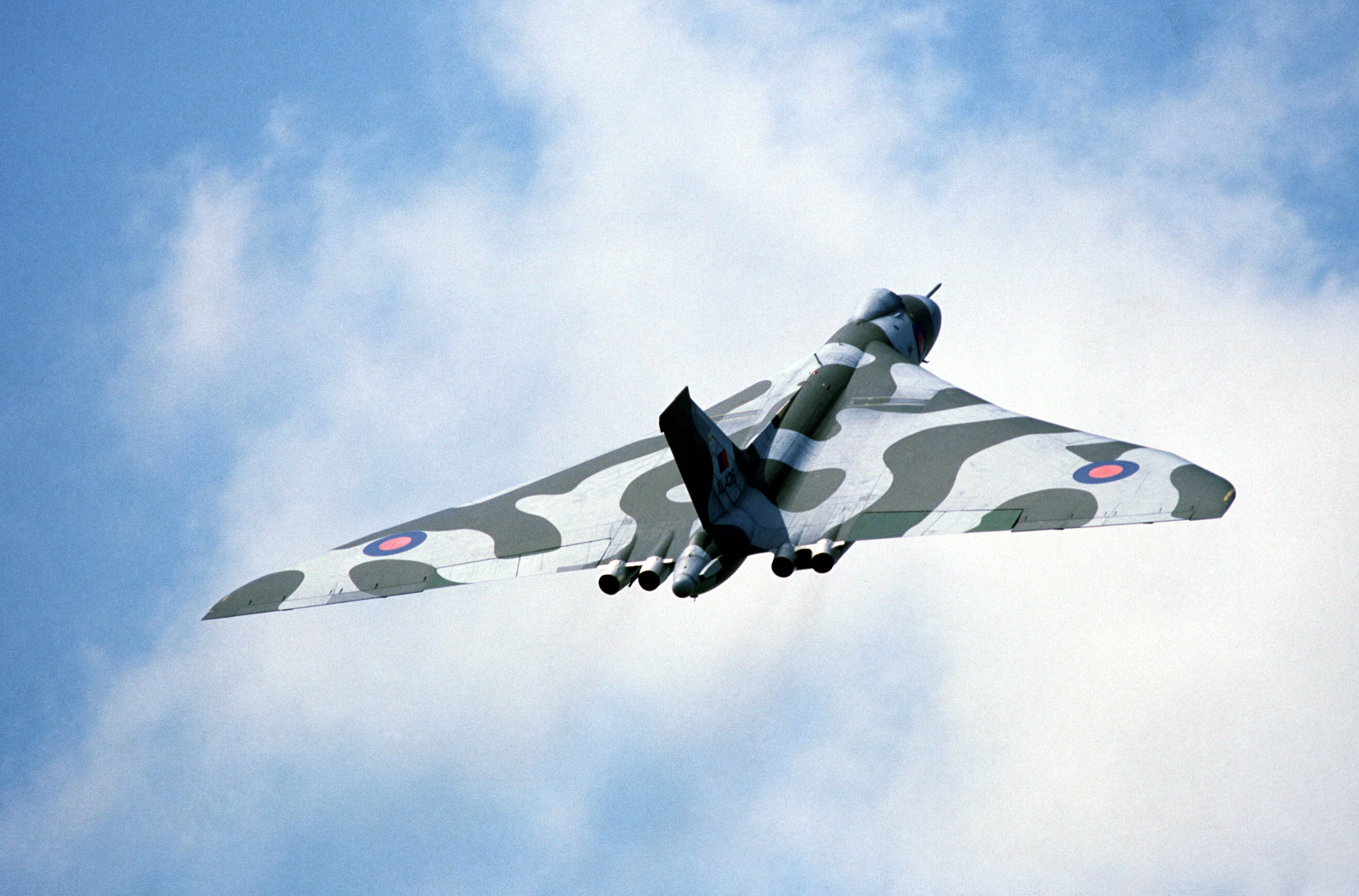
Avro Vulcan

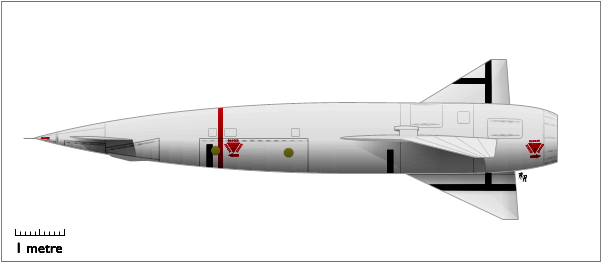
Blue Steel missile

The civilian Lancastrian and maritime reconnaissance Shackleton were derived from the successful Lancaster design. The Tudor was a pressurised but problematic post-war Avro airliner which faced strong competition from designs by Bristol, Canadair, Douglas, Handley Page, and Lockheed. With the same wings and engines as the Lincoln, it achieved only a short (34 completed) production run following a first flight in June 1945 and the cancellation of an order from BOAC. The older Avro York was somewhat more successful in both the RAF and in commercial service, being distinguished by a fuselage square in cross-section. Both Tudors and Yorks played an important humanitarian part in the Berlin Airlift.

The postwar Vulcan bomber, originally designed as a nuclear-strike aircraft, was used to maintain the British nuclear deterrent, armed with the Avro Blue Steel stand-off nuclear bomb. The Vulcan saw service as a conventional bomber during the British campaign to recapture the Falkland Islands in 1982. Several Vulcans are prized as museum exhibits.

A twin turboprop airliner, the Avro 748, was developed during the 1950s and sold widely to airlines and governments across the globe, powered by two Rolls-Royce Dart engines. The RAF bought 6 for use by the Queen's Flight and a variant with a rear-loading ramp and a "kneeling" main undercarriage was sold to the RAF (31 aircraft) as the Andover.

=== Avro regional jets ===
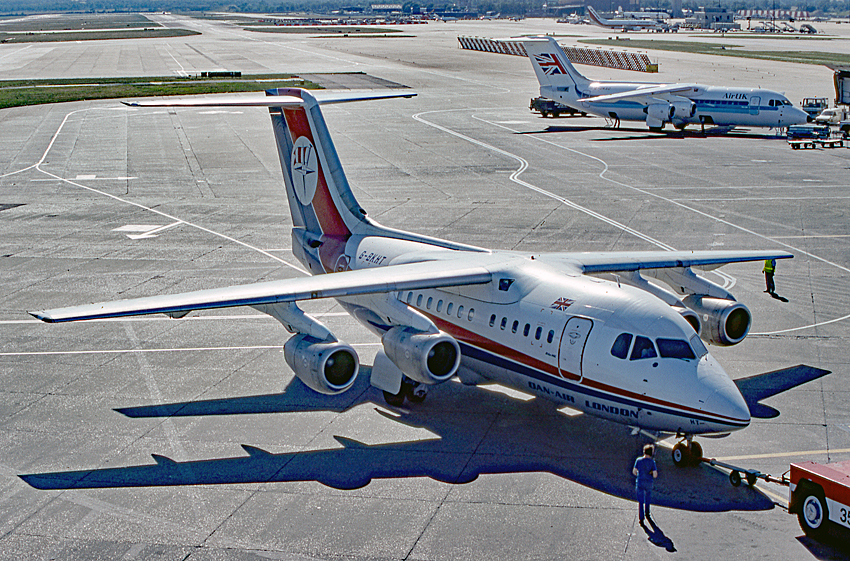
Dan Air and Air UK Avro RJs at Gatwick

The Avro name would subsequently be resurrected by British Aerospace when this aircraft manufacturer renamed its BAe 146 family of regional jetliners as Avro regional jets (Avro RJ). Three differently sized versions of the four engine jetliner were produced: the Avro RJ70, the Avro RJ85 and the largest example, the Avro RJ100.

=== Avro Canada ===
In 1945, Hawker Siddeley Group purchased the former Victory Aircraft firm in Malton, Ontario, and renamed the operation A.V. Roe Canada Limited. Commonly known as Avro Canada, it was actually a subsidiary of the Hawker Siddeley Group and used the Avro name for trading purposes.

=== Amalgamation ===
When the company was absorbed into Hawker Siddeley Aviation in July 1963 following the 1957 Defence White Paper, the Avro name ceased to be used. The brand still had a strong heritage appeal, and as mentioned above the marketing name "Avro RJ" (regional jet) was used by British Aerospace from 1994 to 2001 for production of the RJ70, RJ85 and RJ100 models which were respectively based on the BAe 146-100, BAe 146-200 and BAe 146-300. This four engine jet aircraft type is sometimes also loosely called the "Avro 146".

The BAe ATP (Advanced Turbo Prop) design evolved from the Avro 748 and examples continue in use on shorter, mainly domestic, scheduled air services. A few Avro 504s, Tutors, Ansons and Lancasters are maintained in flying condition. At 39 years, the Shackleton held the distinction of being the aircraft with the longest period of active RAF service, until overtaken by the English Electric Canberra in 1998.

== Avro aeroplanes ==
- Roe I Biplane
- Roe I Triplane
- Roe II Triplane (Also known as the Mercury)
- Roe III Triplane
- Roe IV Triplane
- Avro Type D
- Avro Curtiss type (Also known as the Lakes Water Bird)
- Avro Duigan
- Avro 500 (Type E)
- Roe-Burga monoplane
- Avro Type F
- Avro Type G
- Avro 501 (Type H)
- Avro 502
- Avro 503 (Type H)
- Avro 504
- Avro 508
- Avro 510
- Avro 511
- Avro 514
- Avro 519
- Avro 521
- Avro 523 Pike
- Avro 527
- Avro 528
- Avro 529
- Avro 530
- Avro 531 Spider
- Avro 533 Manchester
- Avro 534 Baby
- Avro 536
- Avro 538
- Avro 539
- Avro 540
- Avro 543 Baby
- Avro 545
- Avro 546
- Avro 547
- Avro 548 Tourist
- Avro 549 Aldershot
- Avro 551
- Avro 552
- Avro 554
- Avro 555 Bison
- Avro 557 Ava
- Avro 558
- Avro 560
- Avro 561 Andover
- Avro 562 Avis
- Avro 563
- Avro 566 Avenger
- Avro 567 Avenger II
- Avro 571 Buffalo
- Avro 572 Buffalo II
- Avro 581 Avian
- Avro 582
- Avro 584 Avocet
- Avro 585
- Avro 594 Avian
- Avro 604 Antelope
- Avro 616 Sports Avian
- Avro 618 Ten
- Avro 619 Five
- Avro 621 Tutor
- Avro 623
- Avro 624 Six
- Avro 625 Avian Monoplane
- Avro 626
- Avro 627 Mailplane
- Avro 631 Cadet
- Avro 637
- Avro 638 Club Cadet (1933)
- Avro 641 Commodore (1935)
- Avro 642 Eighteen
- Avro 643 Cadet
- Avro 646 Sea Tutor
- Avro 652
- Avro 652A Anson (1935)
- Avro 654
- Avro 661
- Avro 667
- Avro 674 – 24 modernised Hawker Audaxes built for the Egyptian government.
- Avro 679 Manchester (1939)
- Avro 683 Lancaster (1941)
  - Avro Lancaster PA474
  - List of Avro Lancaster operators
  - List of surviving Avro Lancasters
- Avro 685 York (1942)
- Avro 688 Tudor (1945)
- Avro 689 Tudor
- Avro 691 Lancastrian (1943)
- Avro 694 Lincoln (1944)
- Avro 695 Lincolnian (1949)
- Avro 696 Shackleton (1949)
- Avro 698 Vulcan (1952)
  - Avro Vulcan XH558
  - Avro Vulcan XM655
- Avro 701 Athena (1948)
- Avro 707 (1949)
- Avro 706 Ashton (1950)
- Avro 748 (1960) – became the HS 748 and BAe 748, developed as the Hawker Siddeley Andover (HS.780), and later as the BAe ATP

=== Unbuilt projects ===
- Avro 505 – skipped
- Avro 506/Type J – twin-float pusher seaplane gun carrier
- Avro 507 – reserved for a set of mailplanes
- Avro 509 – originally for a set of tanks and struts for the Walsh flying boat; re-used for unbuilt proposed twin-engine tractor biplane seaplane
- Avro 512 – land-based single-engine biplane
- Avro 513 – proposed twin-engine tractor biplane seaplane
- Avro 515 – biplane
- Avro 516 – tractor monoplane
- Avro 517 – biplane version of Type 516
- Avro 518 – single-seat tractor aircraft
- Avro 520 – single-seat landplane for RNAS
- Avro 522 – modified Type 519 with larger but equal-span wings
- Avro 524 – scout aircraft
- Avro 525 – single-seat ground attack aircraft for spec. AM Class II
- Avro 526 – Type 525 with monoplane tail
- Avro 535 – long-range biplane to compete for the "Daily Mail" transatlantic prize
- Avro 537 – 10-passenger biplane airliner
- Avro 541 – twin-float reconnaissance seaplane for RAF spec. XXI
- Avro 542 – projected 6-seat airliner
- Avro 544 – two-seat version of Type 534
- Avro 550 – proposed reconnaissance triplane for spec. 37/22
- Avro 550 – projected three-engine 15-passenger European transport for spec. 40/22
- Avro 553 – proposed version of Type 548 with enclosed cabin
- Avro 556 – single-engine torpedo bomber design for spec. 16/22; developed into Type 557
- Avro 557 – single-seat, single-engine monoplane
- Avro 559 – single-seat light monoplane for the Lympne Trials, not built; replaced by Type 560
- Avro 564 – two-seat monoplane fighter with thick section elliptical wing
- Avro 565 – Type 564 with Napier Lion engine
- Avro 568 – all-metal single-seat fighter
- Avro 569 – Avenger with RAF.30 section wings, not built
- Avro 573 – commercial trimotor biplane to spec. 26/24 for Imperial Airways
- Avro 577 – general purpose land-based biplane
- Avro 578 – seaplane version of Type 577
- Avro 579 – Avis with RAF.15 section wings
- Avro 580 – private venture trimotor biplane heavy bomber
- Avro 583 – Avenger II with Napier Lion IX engine
- Avro 588 – Avian modified as monoplane racer
- Avro 589 – floatplane version of Avian
- Avro 590 – two-seat Army co-operation biplane to Australian spec
- Avro 591 – two-seat fighter version of Type 590
- Avro 592 – seaplane version of Type 590
- Avro 593 – two-seat seaplane fighter version of Type 592
- Avro 595 – "CN.2"; two-seat land/seaplane for spec. O.22/26
- Avro 596 – "CN.1"; three-seat bomber version of Type 595
- Avro 597 – two-seat land-based bomber of Buffalo I
- Avro 598 Warregull I – two-seat trainer for Australia
- Avro 599 Warregull II – redesigned Type 598
- Avro 600 – Avian III with RAF.15 section wings
- Avro 601 – two-seat reconnaissance biplane
- Avro 602 – modified version of Avenger
- Avro 603 – 8-passenger monoplane airliner to Australian spec.
- Avro 606 – three-engine monoplane maritime patrol flying boat for spec. 4/27
- Avro 607 – Type 606 with round-section hull
- Avro 608 Hawk – two-seat biplane fighter based on the Antelope; re-worked into Type 622 during construction
- Avro 610 Saloon – five-seat high-wing cabin monoplane
- Avro 613 – twin-engine monoplane night bomber for spec. B.19/27
- Avro 614 – three-engine high-wing airliner
- Avro 615 – Type 614 with two Jaguar IV engines
- Avro 622 Hawk – Type 608 with Panther II engine; converted to Type 627 during construction
- Avro 626 – low-wing sports monoplane
- Avro 628 Five Mk. III – Mail plane version of Type 619
- Avro 629 – Mail plane version of Type 618 for spec. 21/28
- Avro 630 – day bomber version of Type 627
- Avro 632 – fleet torpedo bomber/reconnaissance biplane for spec. S.9/30
- Avro 633 Cadet Fighter – projected version of Type 631
- Avro 634 – two-seat low-wing sports monoplane
- Avro 635 – three-seat low-wing cabin monoplane
- Avro 636 – two-seat biplane fighter; closely resembled the Armstrong-Whitworth Scimitar
- Avro 644 – 2-seat reconnaissance/bomber developed from the Type 637
- Avro 645 – six-seat, twin-engine, low-wing airliner
- Avro 647 – six-seat, twin-engine, low-wing airliner
- Avro 648 – six-seat, twin-engine, low-wing airliner
- Avro 649 – 17-seat, four-engine airliner
- Avro 650 Eight – eight-seat version of Type 642
- Avro 651 – trimotor monoplane
- Avro 653 – long-range shipborne biplane seaplane
- Avro 655 – twin-engine bomber
- Avro 656 – low-wing version of Type 655
- Avro 657 Tiger Fighter – military variant of Type 654
- Avro 658 – three-seat low-wing monoplane
- Avro 659 – scaled down high-wing version of Type 652
- Avro 660 – low-wing version of Type 659, only a mockup built
- Avro 662 – improved version of Type 621, redesignated to Type 669
- Avro 663 Cadet Trainer – Type 643 with Genet Major engine
- Avro 664 – alternative design to Type 652A
- Avro 666 – single-engine biplane bomber for spec. O.27/34; prototype ordered but cancelled
- Avro 668 – twin-engine cabin autogiro
- Avro 669 – improved version of Type 621
- Avro 670 – proposed army co-operation sesquiplane for spec. A.39/34
- Avro 672 – twin-engine reconnaissance monoplane for spec. G.24/35
- Avro 673 – twin-engine advanced gunnery trainer
- Avro 675 – reconnaissance monoplane for specs. G.24/35 and M.15/35
- Avro 676 – advanced trainer for spec. T.6/36
- Avro 677 – alternate version of Type 676 with rear gun turret
- Avro 678 – a curious fighter project that saw a R-R Merlin mounted in the fuselage driving wing-mounted airscrew propellers
- Avro 680 – four-engine heavy bomber for spec. B.1/39
- Avro 681 – heavy bomber project
- Avro 682 – heavy bomber project
- Avro 684 – proposed high-altitude pressurized bomber based on the Lancaster
- Avro 685B – long-range flying boat transport
- Avro 695 Lincolnian – transport conversion of Lincoln
- Avro 686 – proposed high-altitude Lancaster replacement
- Avro 687 – Avro XX; projected Empire route airliner based on the Lincoln for spec. 29/43
- Avro 690 – Avro XXII; transatlantic six-engine airliner for spec. Brabazon Type 3A
- Avro 692 – Avro XXIII; projected six-engine transatlantic airliner for spec. Brabazon Type 3
- Avro 693 – projected Empire route turbojet airliner for spec. Brabazon Type 3A
- Avro 697 – medium-range 48 passenger airliner for Empire route to spec. 2/47
- Avro 699 – version of Type 689 with tricycle landing gear and broad chord fin for BEA to carry 60 passengers
- Avro 700 – 12 passenger transport to replace Anson
- Avro 702 – aircrew trainer for Canada
- Avro 703 – proposed 36 passenger turbojet airliner for Trans-Canada Airlines
- Avro 704 – two-seat advanced aircrew trainer
- Avro 704B – version of Type 704 based on Athena
- Avro 705 – 36 passenger turbojet airliner based on Type 688 with tricycle landing gear
- Avro 706 – lengthened version of Type 705
- Avro 708 – 60 passenger long-range airliner
- Avro 709 – long-range transport based on Tudor II
- Avro 710 – delta-wing research aircraft for Type 698 development, 1/10 scale model of Type 698
- Avro 711 – version of Tudor 4 as a 36 passenger airliner/freighter
- Avro 711A Trader – freighter version of Tudor 4 for spec. 23/48
- Avro 712 – meteorological aircraft based on Lincoln II to OR.259
- Avro 713 – version of Type 712 based on Shackleton
- Avro 714 – single-engine basic trainer to spec. T.16/48, based on Athena
- Avro 715 – 8-10 passenger, four-engine airliner to replace Rapide
- Avro 716 Shackleton Mk.3 – projected development of Type 696, redesigned as Type 719
- Avro 717 – Lincolnian flying test bed
- Avro 718 – delta-wing military transport based on Type 698
- Avro 719 – re-engined Type 716; redesignated Shackleton Mk.4 in 1953
- Avro 720 – planned rocket interceptor, to OR.301 as for the SR.53. Cancelled before flight.
- Avro 721 – proposed low-level bomber for spec. B.126T
- Avro 722 Atlantic –proposed airliner version of the Vulcan
- Avro 723 – DC-3 replacement
- Avro 724 – Project Y; alternative for Avrocar, tail-sitting VTOL
- Avro 725 – advanced trainer version of Type 720 to OR.318
- Avro 726 – single-engine lightweight fighter version of Type 720
- Avro 727 – NATO ground attack aircraft based on Type 720
- Avro 728 – naval version of Type 720
- Avro 729 – single-seat fighter to OR.329
- Avro 730 – supersonic stainless steel canard bomber for spec. B.156T (later R.156T), never completed
- Avro 731 – planned 3/8 scale model of Avro 730
- Avro 732 – planned supersonic version of Avro Vulcan
- Avro 734 – planned long-range decoy air-launched by Vulcans
- Avro 735 – proposed 100 passenger supersonic airliner based on Type 730
- Avro 736 – 30-54 seat transport
- Avro 737 – STOL transport version of Type 736
- Avro 738 – staged weapon system
- Avro 739 – low-level supersonic strike aircraft to OR.339
- Avro 740 – proposed 70-seat trijet airliner with a V-tail; cancelled in favor of the Hawker Siddeley Trident
- Avro 741 – executive/feederliner with a butterfly tail
- Avro 742 – jet-engined military transport
- Avro 743 – long-range turboprop military transport
- Avro 744 – nuclear powered aircraft study
- Avro 745 – maritime patrol aircraft to NATO requirements
- Avro 746 – jet flap research aircraft
- Avro 747 – turboprop transport based on Type 737
- Avro 749 – VTOL 40 passenger transport for BEA
- Avro 750 – short-range 80 passenger transport
- Avro 751 – three-engine airliner
- Avro 752 – VTOL assault aircraft
- Avro 753 – freighter with Type 745 wing
- Avro 754 – low-wing 65-80 passenger airliner version of Type 753
- Avro 755 – 40 passenger STOL transport with deflected slipstream system
- Avro 756 – long-range military transport as Type 743 replacement to same spec. as Short Belfast
- Avro 757 – version of 748 Srs. I with strengthened floor and revised avionics for Indian Air Force, also known as Type 748M
- Avro 758 – high-wing version of Type 748; also known as Type 748R
- Avro 759 – slender delta research aircraft
- Avro 760 – supersonic airliner (Concorde spec.)
- Avro 761 – 77 passenger airliner to replace Viscount
- Avro 762 – advanced weapon system
- Avro 763 – VTOL fan-lift "Jeep"
- Avro 764 – VTOL version of AW.650
- Avro 765 – VTOL fan-lift fighter
- Avro 766 – four-engine turbojet long-range military transport
- Avro 767 – joint airliner project with Bristol to Trident spec.
- Avro 768 – carrier-borne early warning aircraft based on Type 748 to Naval spec. NA.107T
- Avro 769 – VTOL weapons system based on the Vulcan
- Avro 770 – STOL assault transport based on Type 758 using the deflected slipstream technique
- Avro 771 – proposed 60-seat airliner of Type 761 powered by two Bristol Siddeley BS.75 turbofans
- Avro 772 – car ferry/90 passenger transport with tail and outer wing sections from Type 748
- Avro 773 – STOL military freighter
- Avro 774 – long endurance weapons system
- Avro 775 – maritime reconnaissance aircraft to OR.350
- Avro 776 – Type 775 to spec. AST.357
- Avro 777 – reserved for appropriate special project, but not used
- Avro 778 – jet engine, 50 passenger version of Type 748; also known as Type 748J
- Avro 779 – high-wing STOL transport using Type 748 components
- Avro 781 – shortened version of Type 778 for 24-32 passengers
- Avro 782 – shortened version of Type 780; originally designated as Type 748S
- Avro 783 – STOL version of Type 780 to NATO requirements
- Avro 784 – four-engine maritime reconnaissance aircraft to AST.357
- Avro 785-799 – not used

=== Rotorcraft ===
- Avro 574/575 – Cierva C.6
- Avro 586/587/611 – Cierva C.8
- Avro 576/581 – Cierva C.9
- Avro 612 – Cierva C.17
- Avro 620 – Cierva C.19
- Avro 671 Rota – Cierva C.30
- Avro 665 – Cierva C.33
- Avro 668 – Cierva C.38
- Cierva C.12 – fitted with floats to become the 'Hydrogiro'

=== Avro Canada ===
- Avro Canada C102 Jetliner
- Avro Canada CF-100 Canuck
- Avro Canada CF-103
- Avro Canada CF-105 Arrow
- Avro Canada TS-140
- Avro Canada VZ-9 Avrocar

==== Unbuilt projects ====
- Avro Canada CF-103 (mock-up only)
- Avro Canada Project Y-1 (mock-up only)
- Avro Canada Project Y-2 (scale test models only)
- Avro Canada PV-704 (built as engine test model only)
- Avro Canada TS-140

== Missiles ==
- Blue Steel missile

== Car production ==
Avro also built motor vehicles in the immediate post-World War 1 era, including the three-wheeler Harper Runabout, as well as their own light car. Powered by a 1,330 cc 4-cylinder engine, wood and aluminium were used in an integral construction similar to an aircraft. Approximately 100 were built.

In 1927 Alliott Verdon-Roe designed a two-wheeler car powered by a 350 cc Villiers air-cooled engine. An outrigger wheel kept the car upright when stationary. The Mobile did not go into production.

== Football ==
Avro F.C. was founded at the Chadderton factory and still exists today.

== See also ==
- Aerospace industry in the United Kingdom
