= Avro 652 =

1930s British light airliner

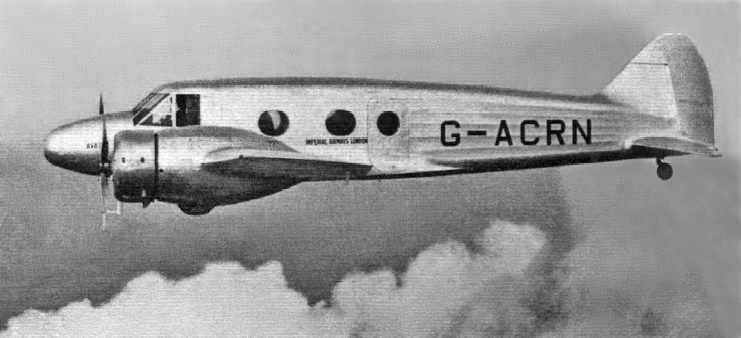
- Avro 652 "Avatar" of Imperial Airways, 1935

General information
- Type: Light airliner and mailplane
- Manufacturer: Avro
- Designer: Roy Chadwick
- Primary users: Imperial Airways Air Service Training Ltd; Fleet Air Arm
- Number built: 2

History
- Manufactured: 1935
- Introduction date: 11 March 1935 (Imperial Airways)
- First flight: 7 January 1935
- Retired: March 1942
- Developed into: Avro Anson

The Avro 652 was a 1930s British light airliner, built by A.V. Roe and Company. It was a twin-engine, low-wing monoplane with a retractable undercarriage, and a tailwheel. Although only two were produced, it formed the basis for the successful Avro Anson.

== Design and development ==
In 1933, Imperial Airways issued a specification to Avro, for a light airliner to transport four passengers for up to 420 mi (676 km) at a cruising speed of 130 mph (210 km/h). By August 1933, Roy Chadwick's team had produced a design study. This had to be revised when Imperial Airways changed the specification, to enable the machine to fly the Karachi-Bombay-Colombo night mail service. The amended design was accepted, and in April 1934 an order for two aircraft was issued. The first aircraft flew on 7 January 1935, and the type was certificated in March 1935.

== Operational history ==
On 11 March 1935, the two Avro 652s were delivered to Imperial Airways at Croydon Airport. They served with Imperial Airways, mostly operating the route from Croydon to Brindisi. In 1938, they were sold to Air Service Training Ltd, a civilian company operating under Air Ministry contracts. They served with No.3 E&RFTS (Elementary and Reserve Flying Training School) as navigational trainers, at Hamble airfield. In November 1939, both aircraft were transferred to No. 11 AONS (Air Observers' Navigation School), remaining at Hamble. In March 1941, they were impressed by the Air Ministry into RAF service with No. 1 School of Photography. In July 1941, both were transferred to the Fleet Air Arm, and served with 811 Squadron at RNAS Lee-on-Solent (HMS Daedalus), until struck off charge in March 1942.

== Aircraft ==
G-ACRM
Imperial Airways, named Avalon, later to Fleet Air Arm with serial DG655.
G-ACRN
Imperial Airways, named Avatar, then Ava, later to Fleet Air Arm with serial DG656.

== Operators ==
United Kingdom

- Air Service Training
- Imperial Airways
- Royal Air Force
- Fleet Air Arm

== Specifications (Avro 652) ==
Data from Flight 7 March 1935

General characteristics

- Crew: 2
- Capacity: 4 passengers
- Length: 42 ft 3 in (12.88 m)
- Wingspan: 56 ft 6 in (17.22 m)
- Height: 9 ft 6 in (2.90 m)
- Wing area: 410 sq ft (38 m^{2})
- Empty weight: 5,100 lb (2,313 kg)
- Gross weight: 7,500 lb (3,402 kg)
- Powerplant: 2 × Armstrong Siddeley Cheetah VI seven-cylinder air-cooled radial engine, 290 hp (220 kW) each

Performance

- Maximum speed: 195 mph (314 km/h, 169 kn) at 6,000 ft (1,800 m)
- Cruise speed: 165 mph (266 km/h, 143 kn) at 6,000 ft (1,800 m)
- Stall speed: 60 mph (97 km/h, 52 kn) (minimum flying speed)
- Range: 787 mi (1,267 km, 684 nmi)
- Service ceiling: 21,500 ft (6,600 m)
- Rate of climb: 950 ft/min (4.8 m/s)

== See also ==
Related development

- Avro Anson

Aircraft of comparable role, configuration, and era

- Airspeed Envoy
- Bristol 142
- Percival Q.6

Related lists

- List of aircraft of Imperial Airways

== Bibliography ==
- "For Imperial Airways Charters: Two Avro 652 Low-wing Monoplanes With Siddeley "Cheetah" Engines: Finely Finished Passenger Accommodation". Flight. Vol. XXVII, no. 1367. 7 March 1935. pp. 240–242.
- Jackson, A.J. (1974). British Civil Aircraft since 1919 Volume 1. Putnam. ISBN 0-370-10006-9.
- Jackson, A J (1990). Avro Aircraft since 1908 (2nd ed.). Putnam. ISBN 0-85177-834-8.
- Mondey, David (1994). The Hamlyn Concise Guide to British Aircraft of World War II. Chancellor Press. ISBN 1-85152-668-4.
- Sturtivant, Ray. 1988. The Anson File. Air-Britain ISBN 0-85130-156-8
