= Avro 529 =

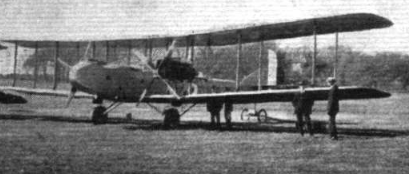

General information
- Type: Long-range bomber
- National origin: United Kingdom
- Manufacturer: A.V. Roe & Co.
- Number built: 2

History
- First flight: April 1917
- Developed from: Avro Pike

The Avro 529 was a twin-engined biplane long-range bomber of the First World War. Two prototypes were built but no production ensued.

== Development ==
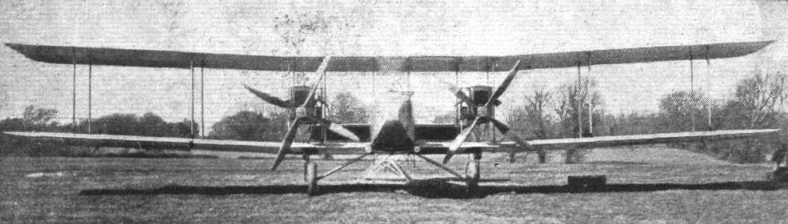
The Avro 529 with the mid-wing nacelles of its Rolls-Royce Falcon engines

The Avro 529 was Avro's second twin-engined aircraft and their second attempt at a heavy bomber. Their first in both categories was the Pike, developed in early 1916 to Royal Flying Corps (RFC) guidelines for a short-range bomber. The Pike arrived too late to secure orders from the RFC who would order the Handley-Page O/100 and for the Royal Naval Air Service (RNAS) who had ordered the Short Bomber. Nonetheless, after trials of the Pike, the Admiralty ordered two prototypes of an enlarged Pike for a long-range bomber role. This was the Type 529.

Like the Pike, it was a large twin-engined biplane of the then-standard wood and canvas construction. It had three-bay wings without sweepback, dihedral or stagger, partly to facilitate wing folding. The vertical tail was different from that of the Pike: it had a small, roughly triangular fin and a rudder with a round balance surface above the fin, a reminder of Avro's "comma" rudder form.

The fuselage was rectangular in cross-section and seated three in separate cockpits. The pilot sat just forward of the wing leading edge, there was a gunner's position (with emergency dual control) midway between the trailing edge and the tail and the front gunner/bomb-aimer's position was in the nose. Both gunners' positions were provided with a .303 in (7.7 mm) Lewis Gun mounted on a Scarff ring. The landing gear used two main wheels on split axles, plus a tail-skid.

The two prototypes differed from each other chiefly in their powerplants. The first, just known as the Avro 529, had a pair of uncowled Rolls-Royce Falcon water-cooled in-line engines mounted midway between the wings. Each produced 190 hp (140 kW) and drove four-bladed, opposite-handed wooden airscrews. It carried 140 gal (636 L) of fuel in a tank in the centre fuselage.

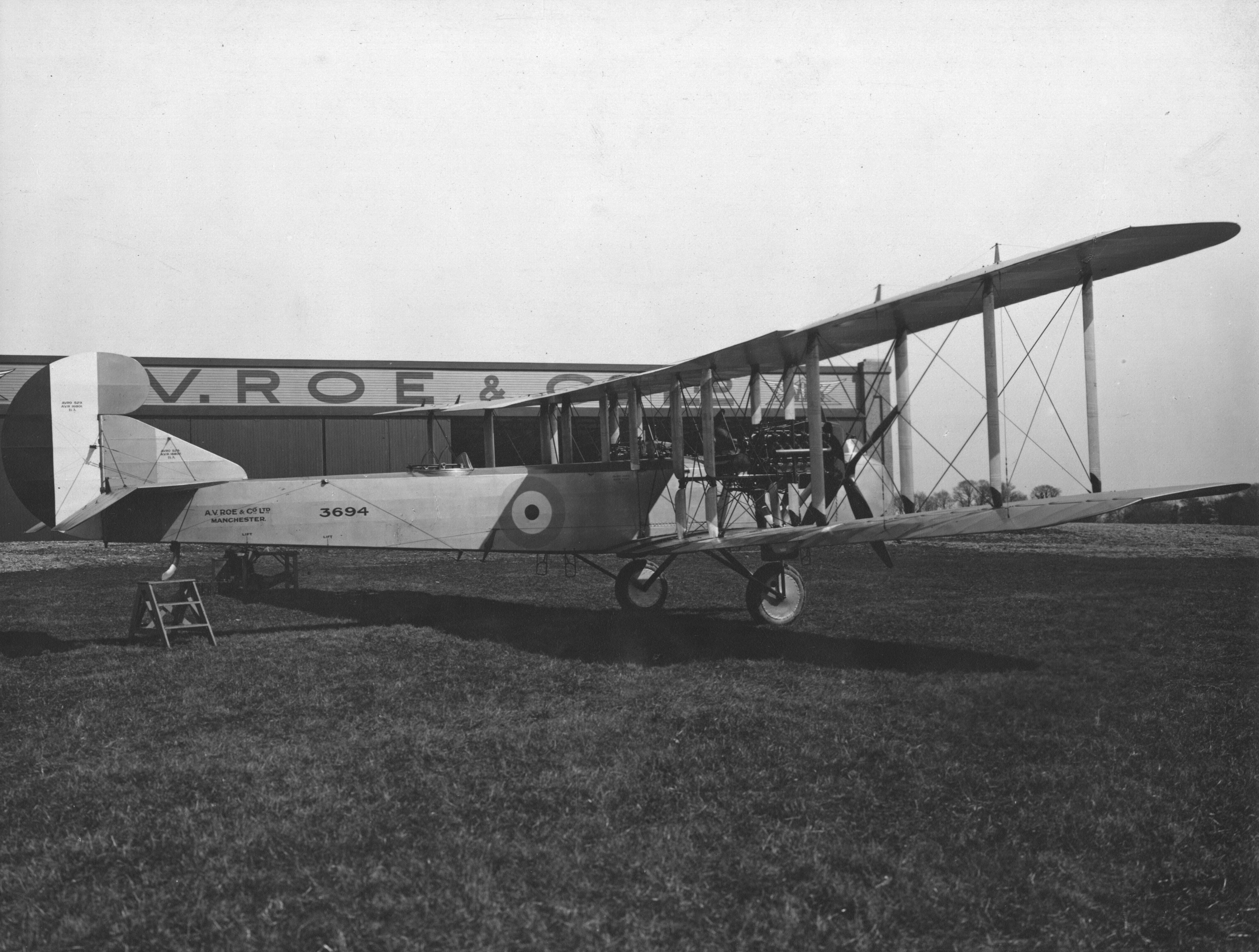
Avro 529

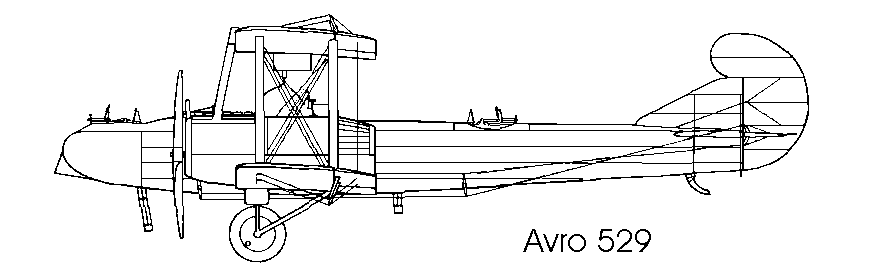
Avro 529A, showing low set nacelles of the BHP engines

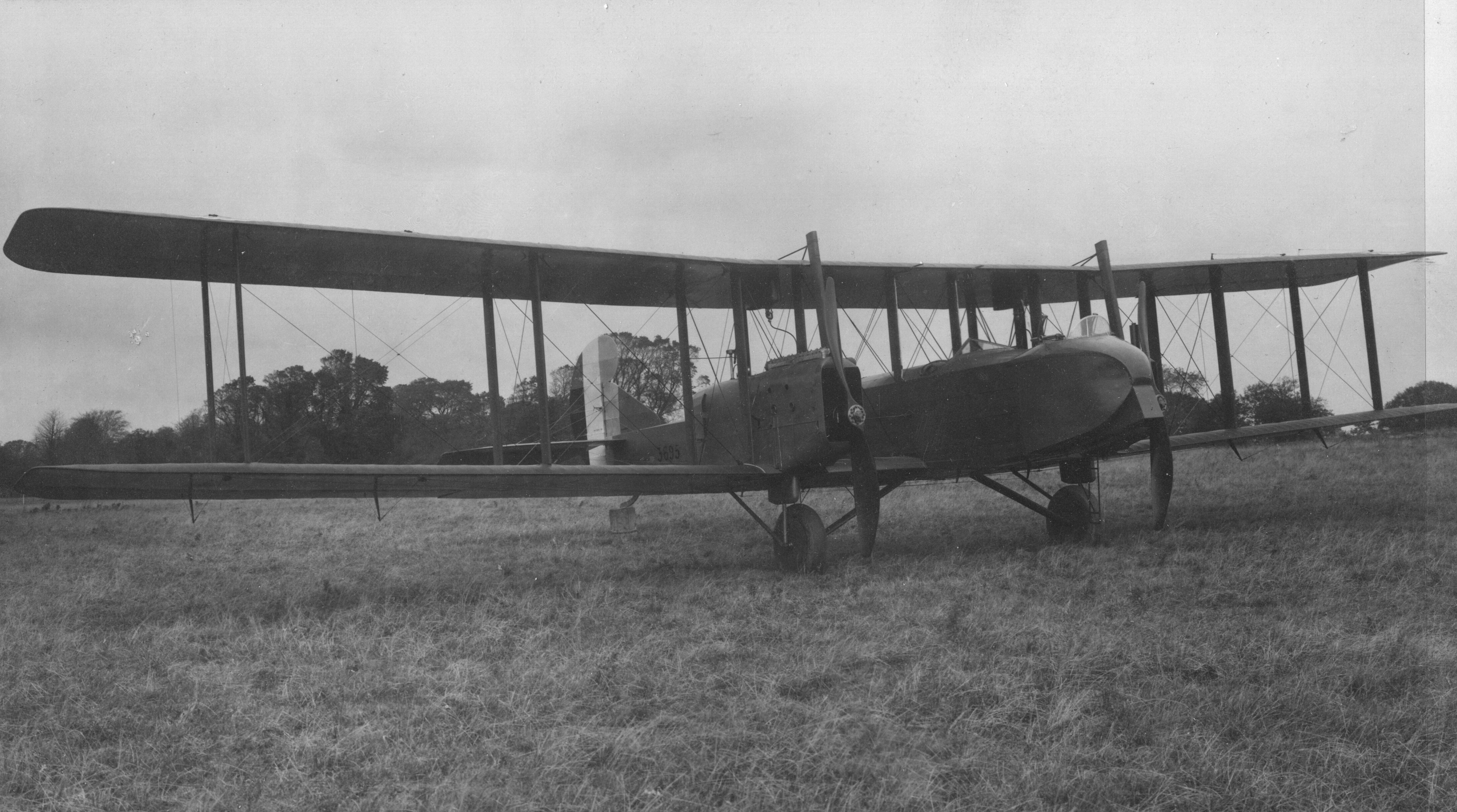
Avro 529A

The second machine, designated the Avro 529A, had a pair 230 hp (170 kW) BHP in-line water-cooled engines, cowled and mounted in nacelles on the lower wing. These drove wooden, two-bladed airscrews. In this aircraft fuel was held in a pair of 60 gal (273 L), one in each nacelle. Fuel was pumped from these to 10 gal (45 L) tanks above the engines by wind-driven pumps, and fed to the motors under gravity.

The type 529A had slightly different wings to the first prototype, 13 in (33 cm) greater in span, smaller in area and hence of higher aspect ratio. It was about 8% lighter.

Another difference between the two prototypes were the arrangements for the bomb-aimer. In the first machine, this was done from the seat of the front cockpit, but in the 529A there was provision for a prone bomb-aimer's position with a small window, noticeable in side view. From there, he communicated with the pilot by Gosport tube. The 529A could carry 20 50 lb (20 kg) bombs racked nose up inside the fuselage between the lower wing spars.

The Type 529 was, even with the B.H.P. engines rather low powered, but seems to have handled well apart from poor elevator control. There was no production order and the type was not developed further.

== Specifications (529A) ==
Data from Jackson 1965, pp. 93–4

General characteristics

- Crew: 3
- Length: 39 ft 8 in (12.09 m)
- Wingspan: 64 ft 1 in (19.53 m)
- Height: 13 ft 0 in (3.96 m)
- Wing area: 910 sq ft (84.54 m^{2})
- Empty weight: 4,361 lb (1,978 kg)
- Gross weight: 7,135 lb (3,236 kg)
- Powerplant: 2 × B.H.P. (Galloway built) , 230 hp (170 kW) each

Performance

- Maximum speed: 116 mph (187 km/h, 101 kn)
- Endurance: 5.25 hours
- Service ceiling: 17,500 ft (5,335 m)
- Rate of climb: 715 ft/min (3.6 m/s) to 5,000 ft (1,525 m)

Armament

- 20 × 50 lb (23 kg) bombs
- 1 × trainable .303 in (7.7 mm) Lewis Gun on Scarff ring in nose
- 1 × trainable .303 in (7.7 mm) Lewis gun on Scarff ring in dorsal position
