= Avro 627 Mailplane =

Type 627 Mailplane
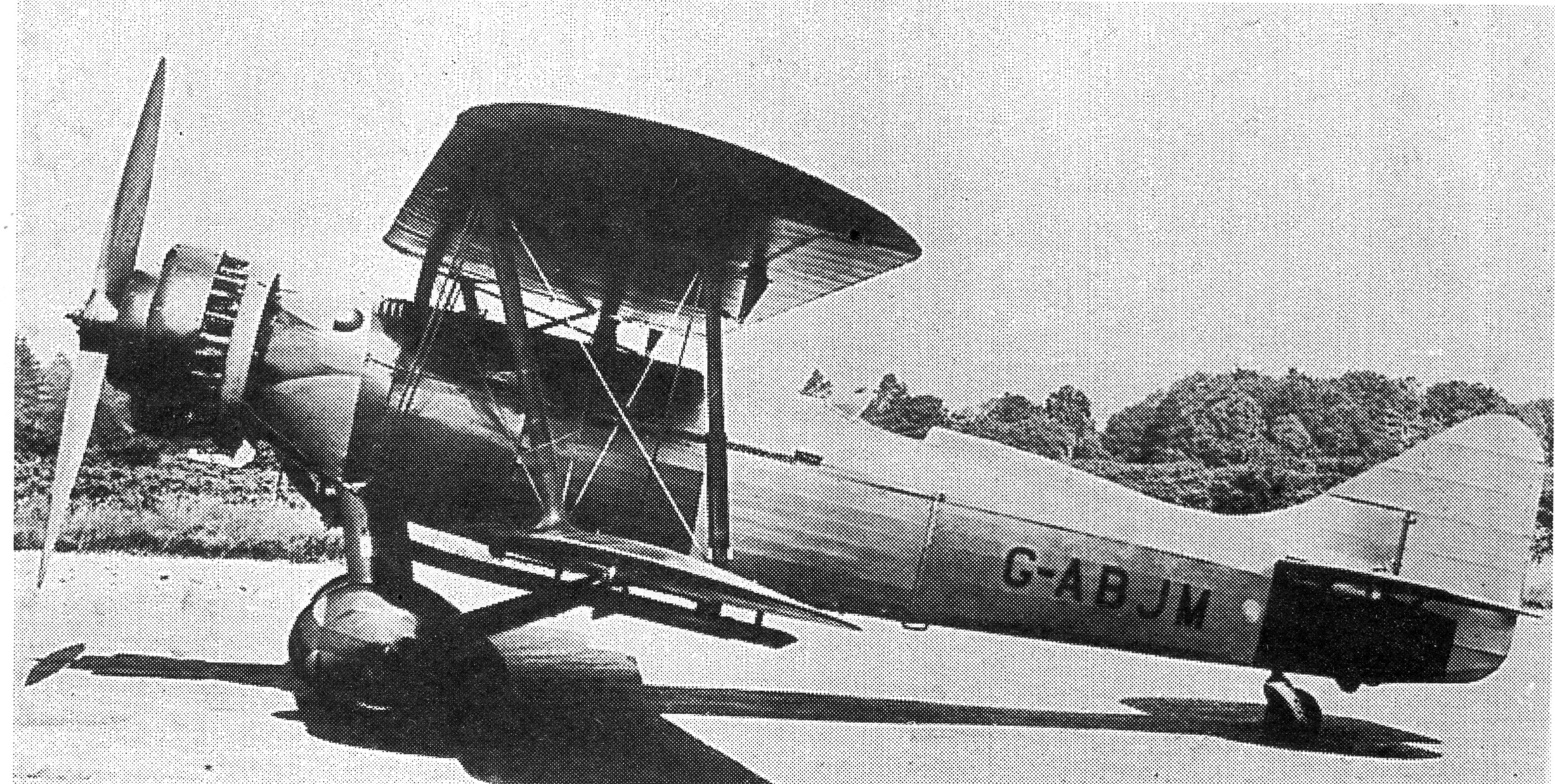

General information
- Type: Light transport
- National origin: United Kingdom
- Manufacturer: Avro
- Status: Prototype
- Number built: 1

History
- First flight: 1931
- Developed from: Avro Antelope

The Avro 627 Mailplane was a British biplane developed in 1931 by Avro from the Avro Antelope light bomber as a mail plane for use in Canada. Only one was built which ended up being used as a test bed.

== Development ==
The Avro 608 Hawk was a proposed two-seater fighter variant of the Antelope, which was planned to be powered by a Bristol Jupiter radial engine. Although construction of a prototype began, it was incomplete when it was redesigned with a 540 hp (400 kW) Armstrong Siddeley Panther engine as the Avro 622.

Following interest by Canadian Airways, who had a possible requirement for a mail plane, Roy Chadwick again redesigned the incomplete prototype to the Avro 627 Mailplane . This was a single-engine, single-bay biplane, powered by a 525 hp (391 kW) Panther engine and fitted for wheel or float operation. The sole prototype (G-ABJM) was certificated on 2 August 1931, and was shipped to Canada for operational trials. While these trials were successful, the Canadian government cut the subsidy for civil aviation and so Canadian Airways was unable to afford new aircraft, so the mailplane was returned to England.

The Mailplane was converted in 1933 to a high-speed test bed for the Armstrong Siddeley Tiger engine, the revised aircraft being known as the Avro 654.

== Operational history ==
On return from Canada, the Mailplane was entered in the 1932 King's Cup Race, where it recorded the fastest speed of 176 mph (283 km/h), although owing to the handicap system, it came 29th.

After conversion to the Avro 654, the aircraft operational life was short, it being dismantled at Woodford Aerodrome in 1934.

== Variants ==
Avro 608 Hawk
Proposed two-seat fighter, powered by 425 hp (317 kW) Bristol Jupiter engine. Prototype incomplete.
Avro 622
Redesigned Avro 608, powered by 540 hp (400 kW) Armstrong Siddeley Panther II engine. Incomplete prototype converted to Avro 627.
Avro 627 Mailplane
Single-seat mailplane, powered by 525 hp (391 kW) Armstrong Siddeley Panther IIA engine. One prototype built.
Avro 654
Conversion of Avro 627 as high-speed test bed.

== Specifications (Avro 627 Mailplane) ==
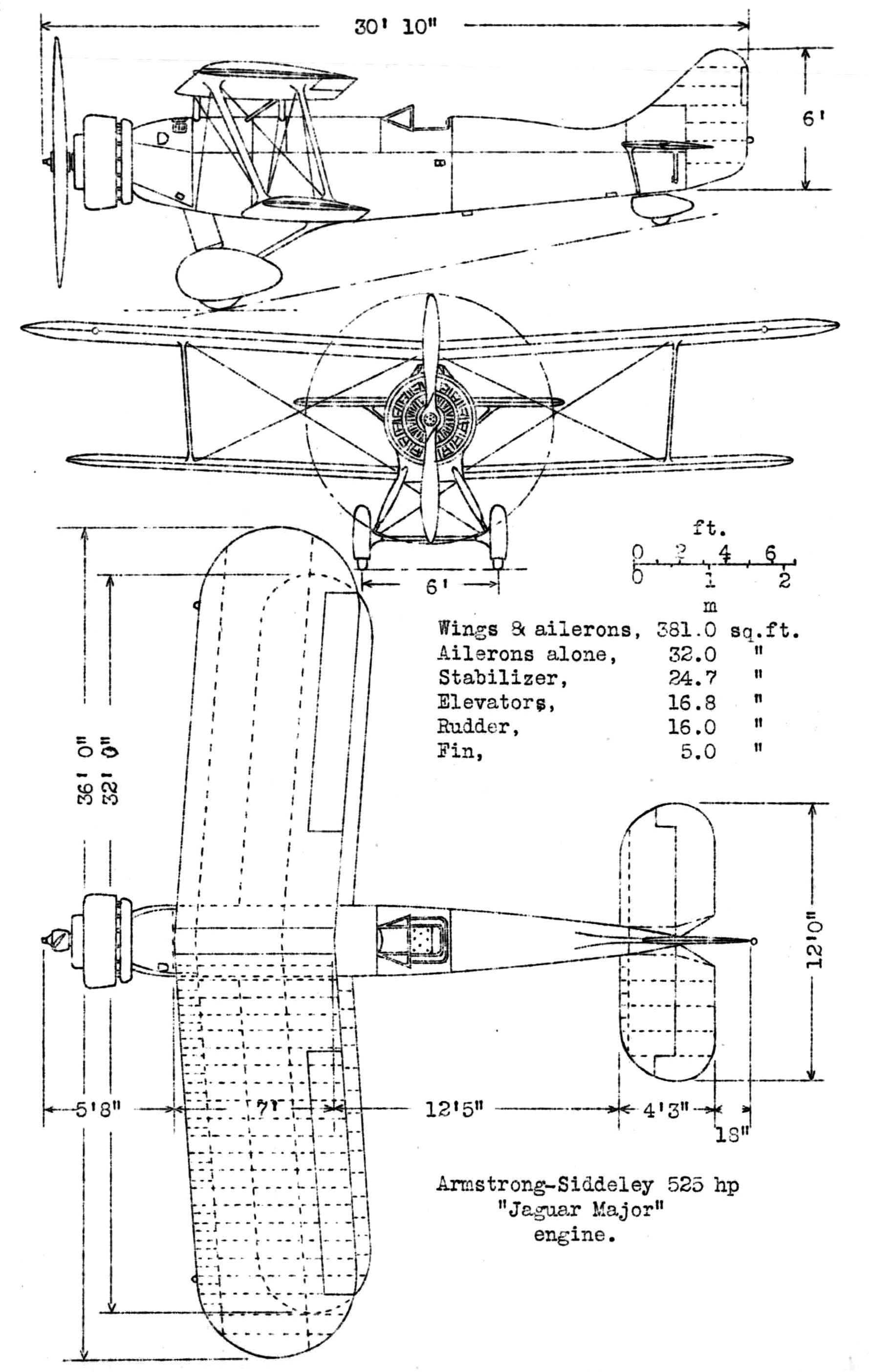
Avro 627 3-view drawing from NACA aircraft Circular No.150

Data from Avro Aircraft since 1908

General characteristics

- Crew: 1
- Capacity: 40 cu ft (1.1 m^{3}) mail compartment
- Length: 30 ft 10 in (9.40 m)
- Wingspan: 36 ft 0 in (10.97 m)
- Height: 10 ft 10 in (3.30 m)
- Wing area: 381 sq ft (35.4 m^{2})
- Empty weight: 3,077 lb (1,396 kg)
- Gross weight: 5,150 lb (2,336 kg)
- Powerplant: 1 × Armstrong Siddeley Panther IIA 14-cylinder air-cooled radial piston engine, 525 hp (391 kW)
- Propellers: 2-bladed fixed-pitch propeller

Performance

- Maximum speed: 170 mph (270 km/h, 150 kn)
- Cruise speed: 147 mph (237 km/h, 128 kn)
- Range: 560 mi (900 km, 490 nmi)
- Service ceiling: 19,000 ft (5,800 m)
- Rate of climb: 1,200 ft/min (6.1 m/s)
- Wing loading: 13.5 lb/sq ft (66 kg/m^{2})
- Power/mass: 0.102 hp/lb (0.168 kW/kg)

== See also ==
Related development

- Avro Antelope
