= Roy Chadwick =

English aircraft design engineer (1893–1947)

Roy Chadwick CBE FRSA FRAeS
- Born: 30 April 1893; Farnworth, Widnes, Lancashire, England
- Died: 23 August 1947 (aged 54); Woodford, Cheshire, England
- Education: UMIST
- Engineering career
- Institutions: Avro
- Projects: Avro Manchester; Avro Lancaster; Avro Vulcan
- Awards: CBE

Roy Chadwick, CBE, FRSA, FRAeS (30 April 1893 – 23 August 1947) was an English aircraft design engineer for the Avro Company.

Born at Marsh Hall Farm, Farnworth, Widnes, the son of the mechanical engineer Charles Chadwick, he was the chief designer for Avro and was responsible for practically all of their aeroplane designs. He is famous in particular for designing the Avro Lancaster bomber, its follow-up Avro Lincoln and preliminary designs of the Avro Vulcan V-bomber. He also converted the Lincoln into the Shackleton. His Avro Yorks carried one-third of the entire British tonnage during the Berlin Airlift.

== Early life ==
Chadwick attended St Clements Church School in Urmston, then studied at night school from 1907 to 1911 at the Manchester Municipal College of Technology whilst training as a draughtsman at the British Westinghouse Electrical Company in Trafford Park under George Edwin Bailey of Metropolitan-Vickers.

== Avro years ==
At the age of 18 in September 1911, he began work as Alliott Verdon-Roe's (later Sir Alliott) personal assistant and the firm's draughtsman at A.V. Roe and Company, Avro, based at Brownsfield Mill, Manchester. Under the direction of A.V. Roe, Chadwick drafted the Avro D, a two-seater tractor biplane, the Avro E, which was converted to a floatplane, and in 1912, the Avro F, the world's first monoplane and enclosed-cabin machine. He then worked on the draughtsmanship for the Avro 500, 501 and 503, which led to Avro's World War I light bomber and trainer, the Avro 504.

In 1915 at age 22, Chadwick designed the Avro Pike, a twin-engined pusher biplane bomber. That year, when starting to design entire aircraft, he was based at Hamble, near Southampton. In 1918 he was appointed Avro's Chief Designer when Avro had about 40 employees. He designed the Avro Baby and in 1920, the Avro Aldershot, the world's largest single-engined bomber and variants of the Aldershot, the Avro Ava and the Avro Andover.

In 1925 he designed an all-metal plane, the single-seater fighter Avro Avenger and in 1926, the Avro Avian in which Bert Hinkler flew the first solo flight from England to Australia in 1928. In 1928, he moved back to the Avro factory in Woodford, Greater Manchester, used by BAE Systems until its closure in 2012. That year, he designed an eight-passenger high wing plane, the Avro 10 and a four-passenger version, the Avro 4. In 1929, he designed the RAF trainer, the Avro Tutor, a smaller version, the Avro Cadet and an enclosed version, the Avro Commodore. This was followed by the Avro Anson, used in World War II for training crews and as transport aircraft.

In the late 1930s work began on a long-range bomber, the Avro Manchester, followed by the Avro Lancaster (Avro 683) of which 7,300 were built. In 1939, production of Avro aircraft was moved to a new factory at Greengate in Chadderton, owned by BAE Systems until its closure in 2012. In 1941, he designed a long-range transport, the Avro York and larger variants of the Lancaster, the Avro Lincoln and the Avro Lancastrian.

After the war, he designed Britain's first pressurised airliner, the Avro Tudor, based around the Lancaster-derivative Avro Lincoln, though few were built and also the Avro Shackleton in 1946. His final involvement with Avro was overseeing the initial designs of the Avro Vulcan (Avro 698) from 1946. Author Harald Penrose describes Chadwick in "British Aviation" as "Artistic with unbounded enthusiasm and unsparing energy, Roy Chadwick was a great designer of intuitive diagnostic ability rather than a scientist, yet like all great masters was in step with the tide of knowledge and contemporary outlook." Chadwick was appointed a Commander of the Order of the British Empire in the 1943 Birthday Honours for his contribution to the design of the Lancaster and in particular for the adaptations he made to it in preparation for the low-level attacks on the German dams, during the Dam Busters raid Operation Chastise. The same year he was granted the Honorary Freedom of the City of London.

== Personal life ==
Chadwick married Mary Gomersall, daughter of the English Sewing Cotton Company (ESCC) head cashier, in 1923 and had two daughters.

== Death ==
Chadwick died on 23 August 1947 in a crash during the takeoff of the prototype Avro Tudor 2 G-AGSU from Woodford Aerodrome, in the vicinity of Shirfold Farm. The accident was due to an error in an overnight servicing in which the aileron cables were inadvertently crossed. His bust is displayed at the RAF Club in London, among other notable designers, and at the Chadwick Centre at the International Bomber Command Centre in Lincoln.

== Legacy ==
The Chadwick Centre at the International Bomber Command Centre in Lincolnshire is named in honour of Chadwick. He is commemorated by a blue plaque on the surviving office building of the Avro factory at Greengate. and a blue plaque at 38 Chessel Avenue in Bitterne, Hampshire, where he lived from 1922 to 29 when the AVRO design team was based nearby at Hamble.

The A523 bypass around Poynton, which crosses the former Woodford Aerodrome runway, has been named Roy Chadwick Way in his honour. Another Roy Chadwick Way has been created in BAE Systems' new Enterprise Zone at the site of the old Samlesbury Aerodrome.

In Widnes, the town of his birth, there is a storyboard depicting the life and achievements of Chadwick. It sits on the edge of a footpath between Shackleton Avenue and Derby Road. Nearby, amongst numerous other streets with aviation-related names, is Chadwick Lane.

=== Chadwick’s private papers ===
Family correspondence with his daughter Rosemary Lapham, congratulations, personal documentation as well as photographs of family, acquaintances and aircraft, some conceptual engineering drawings and other mementos have been digitised and are available online.

== See also ==
- Stuart Davies, also assisted Chadwick in the conversion of the Manchester to the Avro Lancaster (an updated Avro Manchester)
- Claude Lipscomb (CPT Lipscombe), designer of the Short Stirling
- George Volkert, responsible for the Handley Page Halifax
