= 636 (disambiguation) =

636 is one of the Arabic numerals in the 600 (number) range. It may also refer to:

- the year 636
- the area code 636 in the United States
- a British fighter-trainer, the Avro 636, dating from the 1930s
- 636 Erika, a minor planet orbiting the Sun and discovered in 1907
- the minuscule 636 (in Gregory-Åland numbering) is a New Testament manuscript
- United Nations Security Council Resolution 636 from July 1989 regarding certain Palestinians deported from Israeli-occupied territories
- 636cc versions of the Kawasaki ZX-6R
