= Avro Burga =

Burga

General information
- Type: Experimental aircraft
- National origin: United Kingdom
- Manufacturer: Avro
- Designer: R.F.Burga
- Number built: 1

History
- First flight: 20 November 1912
- Retired: 1913

The Avro Burga was built by Avro for R.F. Burga to test his unique system of lateral control. It was a single-engined two-seat monoplane, fitted with differentially operated surfaces above and below the central fuselage.

== Development ==
Since the Wright brothers' crucial work on aircraft control, lateral control has almost always been provided by moving the surface of the wing, either by wing warping or with ailerons. Lieut. R.F. Burga of the Peruvian Navy made the radical suggestion that it might be better to effect lateral control with two rudder-like surfaces, mounted near the centre of gravity and at right angles to the wings. A roll would be initiated by turning these surfaces, one below and one above the fuselage, in opposite directions. Burga applied for a patent in 1910 and it was published on 2 November 1911. He approached A.V Roe & Co., who would build other people's designs for them, and in 1912 a single-engined shoulder-winged monoplane was produced with the novel control surfaces. It has been suggested that this aircraft may have been the Avro 502, about which all that is known is that it was a monoplane.

The Burga monoplane was built at Avro's Manchester factory at the same time as the prototype Avro Type E biplane, and it used the same tail unit and undercarriage. Control surfaces apart, it differed primarily in being a monoplane, but also in having a more slender fuselage, though still a two-seater, and in using a less powerful but lighter engine, a 50 hp (37 kW) Gnome rotary. The wings were braced from below to strong points on the undercarriage and from above to a pylon just ahead of the front cockpit. A vertical shaft attached to this pylon appears also to have carried the leading edges of the lateral control surfaces; the one below the fuselage was almost rectangular but the upper one was shaped to avoid the passenger's head.

== Operational history ==
Though Avro aircraft had always been built in Manchester, they had never flown from there but rather from the Avro School's base at Brooklands; in August 1912, however, the school had moved to Shoreham on the south coast, which is where the Burga machine was test flown. The first flight was carried out on 20 November 1912, piloted by H.R. Simms one of the School's pilots. The monoplane had been designed to take wings of different camber and incidence, and those chosen for the early testing were expected to give the highest speed. Simms reported that the aircraft was fast and had a good rate of climb, but no reports on handling with the new surfaces seem to have survived. After more flying, the aircraft was reported as back at the Avro factory for modification but was not seen again.

== Specifications ==
Data from Jackson 1965, p. 45

General characteristics

- Crew: one
- Capacity: one passenger
- Length: 29 ft 0 in (8.84 m)
- Powerplant: 1 × Gnome et Rhône 7-cylinder rotary , 50 hp (37 kW)
