= Avro 684 =

General information
- Type: High-altitude bomber
- National origin: England
- Designer: Avro

History
- Developed from: Avro Lancaster

The Avro 684 was a proposed British high altitude heavy bomber of the Second World War, based on Avro's successful Lancaster.

== Design ==
Due to the increasing vulnerability of contemporary heavy bombers, the need to fly at ever higher altitudes to avoid anti-aircraft fire and fighter interception became paramount. Avro developed the Lancaster to fulfil the requirement for such a high altitude bomber completing a brochure in August 1941, for the Avro 684 Stratosphere Bomber. Roy Chadwick decided to design a bomber that would dispense with defensive armament and rely on altitude and speed to evade enemy defences and was essentially a Lancaster with the nose section containing a pressure cabin (similar to the cabin from the Vickers Wellington B Mark X) and a large 'chin' mounted air intake and heat exchanger assembly. Pressure in the cabin was to be maintained by a Rotol blower at the 10,000 ft (3,000 m) equivalent while at 40,000 ft (12,000 m).

To achieve this performance, Chadwick used an engine arrangement called the 'Master-Slave' layout. The four wing-mounted Rolls-Royce Merlin XX engines driving four-bladed 13 ft (4 m) diameter Rotol propellers, were to be supercharged by a fuselage-mounted slave Rolls-Royce Merlin 45 engine driving a large supercharger supplying pressurised air via an intercooler. The output from the slave engine was to be controlled to supply air at 20,000 ft (6,096 m) equivalent pressure at altitudes between 20,000 ft (6,096 m) and 40,000 ft (12,000 m).

At an all-up weight of 60,000 lb the Avro 684 would be capable of reaching a service ceiling of 42,000 ft, on the mission return reaching 49,600 ft.

Due to the pressure of constant developments to the Lancaster and design work on the York transport derivative of the Lancaster, design of the 684 was suspended.

== Specifications (estimated) ==
Data from British Secret Projects. Fighters & Bombers 1935 - 1950

General characteristics

- Length: 72 ft (22 m)
- Wingspan: 102 ft (31 m)
- Wing area: 1,297 sq ft (120.5 m^{2})
- Max takeoff weight: 60,000 lb (27,216 kg)
- Fuel capacity: 2,130 imp gal (9,683 L)
- Powerplant: 4 × Rolls-Royce Merlin XX V-12 liquid-cooled supercharged piston engines, 1,480 hp (1,100 kW) each at 3,000 rpm at 6,000 ft (1,829 m) without boost
- Powerplant: 1 × Rolls-Royce Merlin 45 V-12 liquid-cooled supercharged piston engine, 1,515 hp (1,130 kW) at 3,000 rpm at 11,000 ft (3,353 m) driving supercharger.
- Propellers: 4-bladed Rotol, 13 ft (4.0 m) diameter fully feathering constant-speed propellers

Performance

- Maximum speed: 410 mph (660 km/h, 360 kn) at 42,500 ft (12,954 m)
- Cruise speed: 320 mph (510 km/h, 280 kn) at 42,000 ft (12,802 m)
- Stall speed: 300 mph (480 km/h, 260 kn)
- Range: 2,300 mi (3,700 km, 2,000 nmi)
- Service ceiling: 50,300 ft (15,300 m) absolute at 38,492 lb (17,460 kg)
- Rate of climb: 940 ft/min (4.8 m/s) at sea level, max weight
- Time to altitude: 57 minutes to 40,000 ft (12,192 m)

Armament

- Bombs: 12,000 lb (5,400 kg) of bombs
