= Great Ancoats Street =

Street in Manchester, England

Coordinates: 53°28′51″N 2°13′30″W

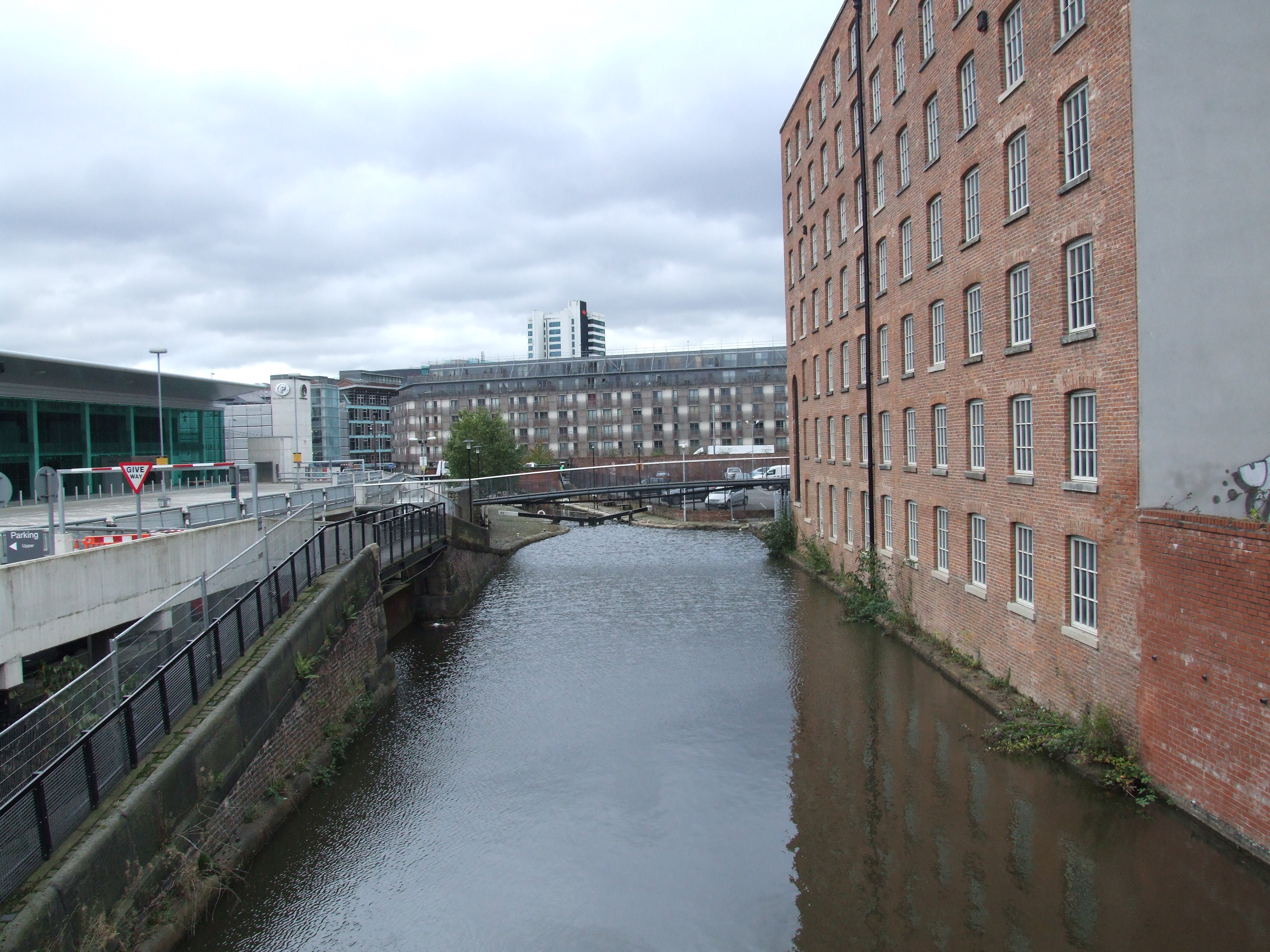
Brownsfield Mill, seen from Great Ancoats Street

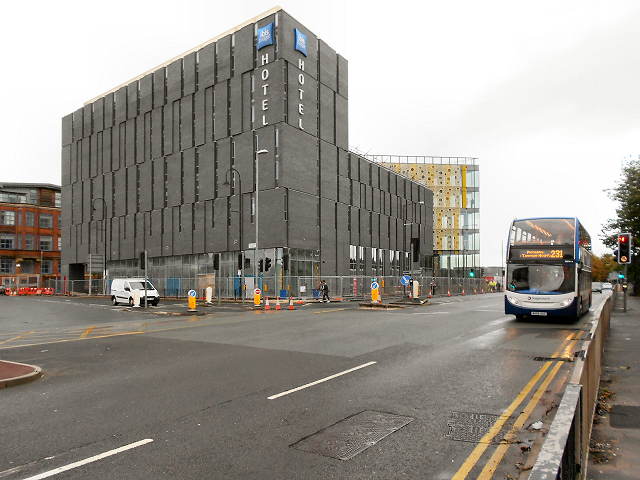
The Ibis hotel

Great Ancoats Street is a street in the inner suburb of Ancoats, Manchester, England. It forms one of the stretches of the city's inner ring road.

A number of cotton mills built in the early and mid-Victorian period are nearby, some of which have been converted into residential or office buildings, such as Albion Mill. The Daily Express Building is on Great Ancoats Street, as is the former Central Retail Park and various hotels.

Great Ancoats Street forms the western boundary of the regenerated New Islington area of Manchester on the side of the Rochdale Canal.

== Details ==
Much of Great Ancoats Street was originally named Ancoats Lane and was the location of Ancoats Hall. The street passed through a thriving manufacturing area during the 19th century. It was near the Ashton and Rochdale canals. A number of cotton mills built in the early and mid-Victorian period are nearby, some of which have been converted into residential or office buildings, such as Albion Mill. The Pin Mill Works at the junction with Fairfield Street was a late 18th-century pin works, that became a cotton mill run by J & J Thompson and works for dyeing and calico-printing. Brownsfield Mill, a Grade II* listed building, was built in 1825.

In 1939, the Grade II* listed Daily Express Building designed by engineer Sir Owen Williams was built on the street.

In the 1980s, a significant area by Great Ancoats Street was redeveloped as the Central Retail Park, which was described as a "row of big-box stores fronted by sterile parking space". Before its closure in 2019, it contained branches of Toys "R" Us, Mothercare and others. An Ibis hotel is at the corner of Pollard Street, south of the Ashton Canal and there are other hotels including a Travelodge and The City Warehouse Aparthotel near the junction with Oldham Road and where Great Ancoats Street becomes Swan Street.

The street has been reported as being gentrified. Great Ancoats Street forms the western boundary of the regenerated New Islington area of Manchester on the side of the Rochdale Canal.
