= Avro 636 =

Type 636

General information
- Type: Fighter Trainer
- National origin: United Kingdom
- Manufacturer: Avro
- Designer: Roy Chadwick
- Primary user: Irish Air Corps
- Number built: 4

History
- Manufactured: 1935
- Introduction date: 1935
- First flight: 1935

The Avro 636 was a single-engined biplane British fighter-trainer built by Avro in the mid-1930s. Four were built for the Irish Air Corps.

== Development ==
The Avro 636 was designed in November 1934 by Roy Chadwick, Avro's chief designer as a one or two-seat fighter-trainer, and was planned to reproduce the flying characteristics of single-seat fighters. It had a similar structure to the Tutor, with a welded steel tube fuselage, and fabric covered metal wings and tail.

The aircraft was designed to be operated as a single or two seater, with the provision for fitting two forward firing .303 in (7.7 mm) Vickers machine guns. When fitted with two seats and powered by a 420 hp (310 kW) Armstrong Siddeley Jaguar IV radial engine, it was known as the Avro 636, and was suitable for advanced training, while when powered by a Armstrong Siddeley Panther and with the rear cockpit faired over, it could be used as a dedicated fighter with the designation Avro 636A.

== Operational history ==
Four Avro 636s were ordered by the Irish Air Corps in December 1934. These aircraft were powered by old Armstrong Siddeley Jaguar IVC engines, which had originally been purchased by the Irish in 1930 for use in Vickers Vespa army co-operation aircraft. Although the Jaguar IVC powered aircraft was planned to be designated as the Avro 667, they were always referred to as Avro 636s.

The four aircraft were delivered in August 1935, where they were operated by the 1st Fighter Squadron based at Casement Aerodrome, Baldonnel, County Dublin. Two 636s were written off in landing accidents, but the remaining two continued in use in the early years of The Emergency (as the Second World War was known in the Irish Republic), being used to intercept aircraft that strayed into Irish airspace. The 636 was retired in 1941.

== Variants ==
Avro 636
Basic design, originally planned to be powered by 420 hp (313 kW) Armstrong Siddeley Jaguar IV engine.
Avro 636A
Version powered by 680 hp (510 kW) Armstrong Siddeley Panther XI engine.
Avro 667
Version powered by unsupercharged 460 hp (340 kW) Armstrong Siddeley Jaguar IVC. Four built for Irish Air Corps. Known as Avro 636 in service.

== Operators ==
Ireland

- Irish Air Corps

== Specifications (Avro 667) ==
Data from Avro Aircraft since 1908

General characteristics

- Crew: 2
- Length: 27 ft 6 in (8.38 m)
- Wingspan: 33 ft 0 in (10.06 m)
- Height: 11 ft 7 in (3.53 m)
- Wing area: 261 sq ft (24.2 m^{2})
- Empty weight: 2,766 lb (1,255 kg)
- Gross weight: 3,271 lb (1,484 kg)
- Powerplant: 1 × Armstrong Siddeley Jaguar IVC 14-cylinder air-cooled radial piston engine, 460 hp (340 kW)
- Propellers: 2-bladed fixed-pitch propeller

Performance

- Maximum speed: 175 mph (282 km/h, 152 kn)
- Service ceiling: 18,000 ft (5,500 m)
- Rate of climb: 1,200 ft/min (6.1 m/s)

Armament

- Guns: 2× Vickers Machine Guns
