= Avro Antelope =

Antelope
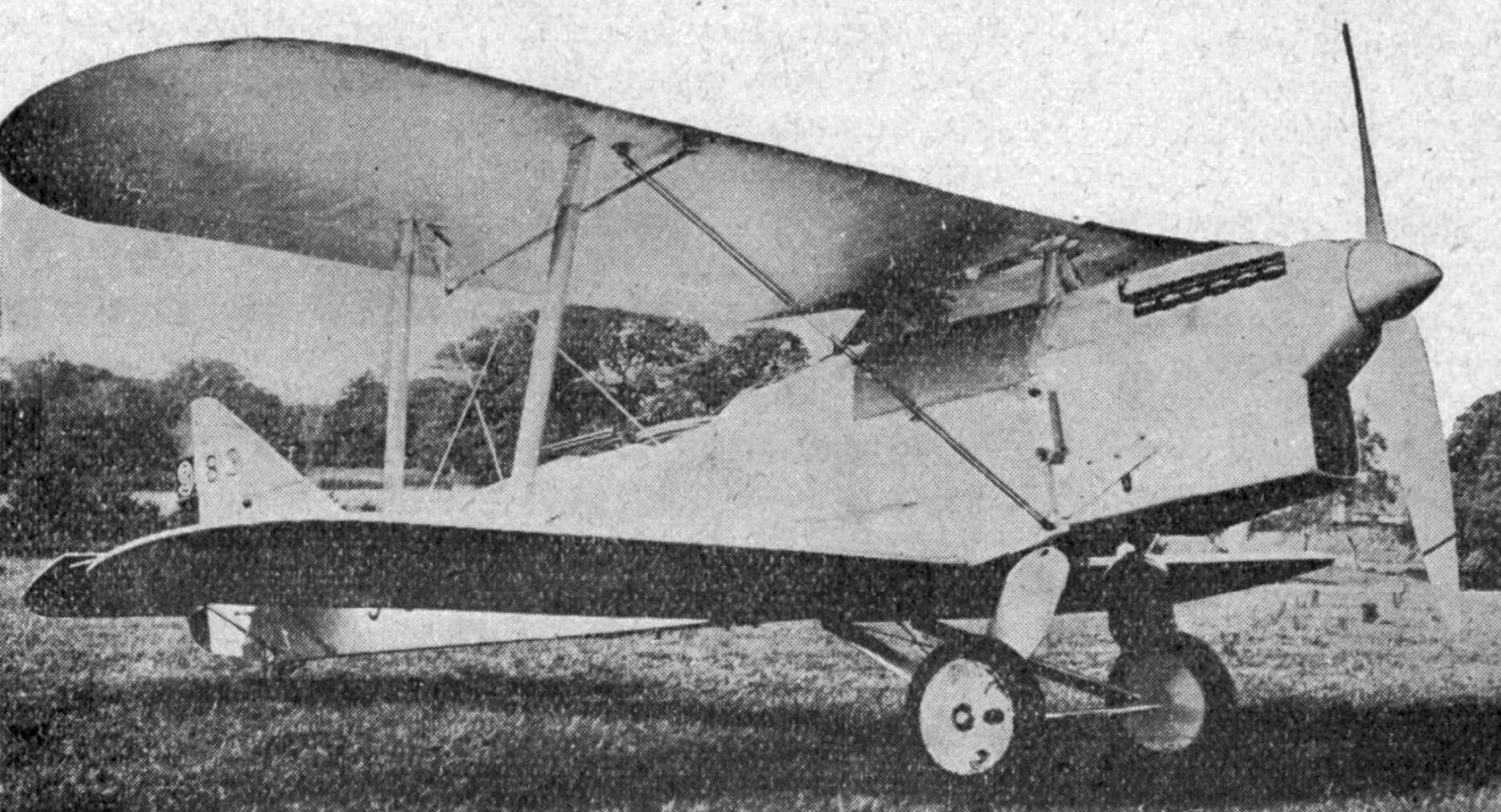

General information
- Type: Light Bomber
- Manufacturer: Avro
- Status: Prototype
- Number built: 1

History
- First flight: July 1928
- Retired: September 1933

The Avro 604 Antelope was a British light bomber which was designed and built in the late 1920s to meet a requirement for a light bomber to equip the Royal Air Force, competing against the Hawker Hart and the Fairey Fox II. It was unsuccessful, the Hart being preferred.

== Design and development ==
The Avro 604 Antelope was designed to meet the requirements of Air Ministry Specification 12/26, for a single-engine light, high-speed day bomber. One prototype was ordered by the Air Ministry, which first flew in July 1928, powered by a 480 hp (360 kW) Rolls-Royce F.XIB (later known as the Kestrel) engine.

The prototype Antelope, which was a single-bay biplane with all-metal construction, was evaluated at the Aeroplane and Armament Experimental Establishment (A & AEE) at Martlesham Heath against the Hawker Hart and Fairey Fox II. While it easily met the performance requirements of the specification, it showed poor low-speed handling and spinning characteristics, and was rejected in favour of the Hart owing to the ease of maintenance of the Hart.

== Operational history ==
After rejection for operational service, the prototype Antelope was fitted with dual controls and used by the Royal Aircraft Establishment as an engine and propeller test bed, remaining in use until September 1933.

== Operators ==
United Kingdom

- Royal Air Force
  - Royal Aircraft Establishment

== Specifications (Antelope) ==
Data from Avro Aircraft since 1908

General characteristics

- Crew: 2
- Length: 31 ft 2 in (9.50 m)
- Wingspan: 36 ft 0 in (10.97 m)
- Height: 10 ft 9 in (3.28 m)
- Wing area: 377 sq ft (35.0 m^{2})
- Empty weight: 2,859 lb (1,297 kg)
- Gross weight: 4,538 lb (2,058 kg)
- Powerplant: 1 × Rolls-Royce F.XI.B V-12 liquid-cooled piston engine, 480 hp (360 kW)
- Propellers: 2-bladed fixed-pitch propeller

Performance

- Maximum speed: 173 mph (278 km/h, 150 kn)
- Cruise speed: 145 mph (233 km/h, 126 kn)
- Range: 580 mi (930 km, 500 nmi)
- Service ceiling: 22,000 ft (6,700 m)
- Rate of climb: 1,470 ft/min (7.5 m/s)
- Wing loading: 12 lb/sq ft (59 kg/m^{2})
- Power/mass: 0.106 hp/lb (0.174 kW/kg)

Armament

- Guns:

- 1 × synchronised, forward-firing .303 in (7.7 mm) Vickers machine gun
- 1 × flexible .303 in (7.7 mm) Lewis Gun in rear cockpit

- Bombs:

- Up to two 250 lb (113 kg) bombs

== See also ==
Related development

- Avro 627 Mailplane

Aircraft of comparable role, configuration, and era

- Hawker Hart
- Fairey Fox
