= Harper Runabout =

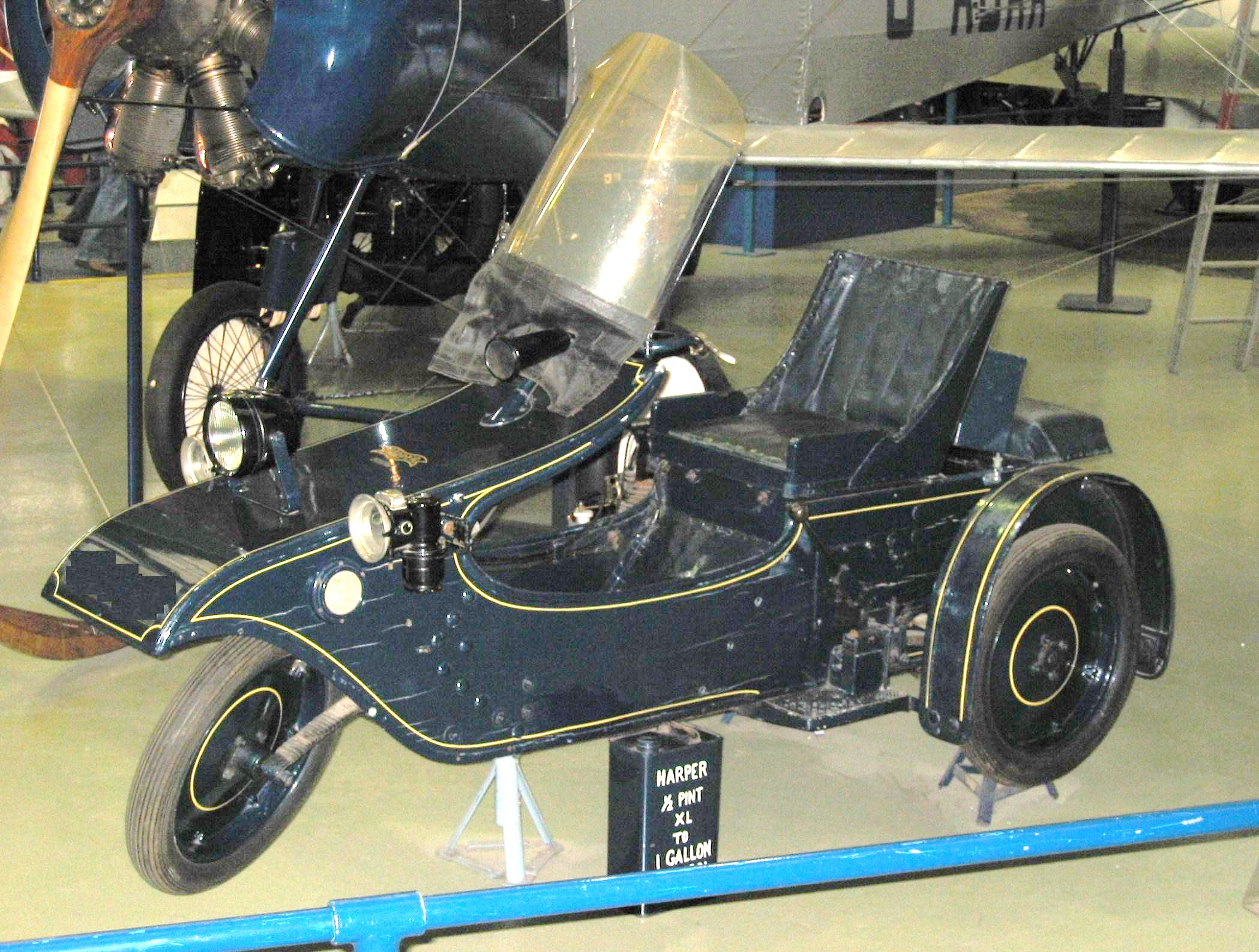
- Harper Runabout c. 1921

Overview
- Production: 1921–26
- Designer: Robert Harper

Body and chassis
- Layout: One front, two rear wheels Rear-wheel drive

Powertrain
- Engine: Single-cylinder, two-stroke 269 cc

The Harper Runabout is a three-wheeled motor vehicle designed by Robert Harper. It was manufactured in Manchester, England, by A.V. Roe & Co. from 1921 until 1926, by which time about 500 Harpers had been produced.
