= Avro 536 =

Military biplane

536 and 546

General information
- Type: Utility aircraft
- Manufacturer: Avro
- Primary users: Surrey Flying Services
- Number built: 26

History
- First flight: May 1919
- Retired: 1930

The Avro 536 and its follow-on design, the 546 were developments of the 504 military biplane, marketed for civil use in the years following World War I. Principally intended for joyriding, the aircraft had greater wing area and a more powerful engine to lift four passengers, seated in two rows of side-by-side seats behind the pilot.

In service at Blackpool, Avro 536s flown by three pilots were able to fly about 500 passengers on their first day of operation. At least one 536 was still providing joyrides on Jersey as late as 1927.

A single variant was produced as the Avro 546, featuring a fully enclosed cabin for the passengers.

== Specifications (536) ==
Data from Biplanes, triplanes, and seaplanes

General characteristics

- Crew: 1
- Capacity: 4 passengers
- Length: 29 ft 5 in (8.97 m)
- Wingspan: 36 ft 9 in (11.20 m)
- Height: 10 ft 5 in (3.18 m)
- Wing area: 335 sq ft (31.1 m^{2})
- Empty weight: 1,431 lb (649 kg)
- Gross weight: 1,010 lb (458 kg)
- Powerplant: 1 × Bentley BR.1 9-cylinder air-cooled rotary piston engine, 150 hp (110 kW)
- Propellers: 2-bladed fixed-pitch propeller

Performance

- Maximum speed: 145 mph (233 km/h, 126 kn)
- Range: 310 mi (500 km, 270 nmi)
- Service ceiling: 12,000 ft (3,700 m)
- Rate of climb: 550 ft/min (2.8 m/s)
