= Avro 511 =

General information
- Type: Scout
- National origin: United Kingdom
- Manufacturer: A.V. Roe & Co.
- Designer: H.E. Broadsmith
- Number built: 1

History
- First flight: 1913?

The Avro 511 was designed as a fast scouting aircraft just before the First World War. Modified, it became the Avro 514. Though it had innovative features, development did not continue after the start of hostilities.

== Design and development ==
The Avro 511 was designed as a fast scout for military use at a time (1913) when the role of aircraft in war was first emerging. It was a single-seat wood-and-canvas biplane. The fuselage was of square cross-section and carried Avro's characteristic "comma" rudder, with no fin. The wings were heavily staggered and had pronounced sweepback, both features intended to improve stability. They were not constructed with the usual span-length spars, but used a cellular approach. The interplane struts were not the usual single-piece shaped rods, but built up multi-piece, wide chord structures covered in canvas. There were conventional midsection "N" type struts between the fuselage and the upper wing. Ailerons were carried on both upper and lower wings. Most unusually for its time, the inboard lower wing featured landing flaps, so the 511 landed at a sedate 35 mph (56 km/h).

The single rotary Gnome Monosoupape was neatly cowled, though this was later modified to improve cooling. Mainwheels were mounted on a single axle plus centre-skid undercarriage and there was a tailskid.

Later in 1914 the 511 was modified with a new pair of wings with no sweepback and a V-form (cranked axle), skidless main undercarriage, becoming the Avro 514.

== Operational history ==
The Avro 511 was on static display at the Olympia Aero Show in London in March 1914 and was entered for the Aerial Derby Race around London in May. The race was postponed by bad weather. Though not as fast as had been estimated (95-100 mph/150–160 km/h), it was entered for the postponed race in June after modification into the Avro 514, but a mechanical failure while taxiing prevented participation.

Repaired, the 514 flew successfully in July 1914, but no further development was undertaken.

== Specifications ==
Data from Jackson 1965, p. 72

General characteristics

- Crew: one
- Length: 22 ft 4 in (6.80 m)
- Wingspan: 26 ft 0 in (7.92 m)
- Height: 9 ft 4 in (2.84 m)
- Wing area: 255 sq ft (23.7 m^{2})
- Empty weight: 675 lb (306 kg)
- Gross weight: 1,165 lb (530 kg)
- Powerplant: 1 × Gnome Monosoupape , 80 hp (60 kW)

Performance

- Maximum speed: 90 mph (145 km/h, 78 kn)
