= Avro Avenger =

British prototype fighter from the 1920s

566 Avenger
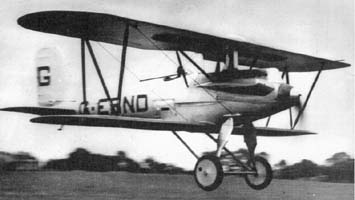
- Avro Type 566

General information
- Type: Fighter
- Manufacturer: Avro
- Designer: Roy Chadwick
- Status: Cancelled
- Primary user: RAF (intended)
- Number built: 1

History
- First flight: 26 June 1926
- Retired: 1931

The Avro 566 Avenger was a prototype British fighter of the 1920s, designed and built by Avro. It was a single-seat, single-engine biplane of wood and fabric construction. Although it was a streamlined and advanced design, it never entered production.

== Development ==
The Avenger was designed as a private venture and Roy Chadwick penned a machine of great aerodynamic cleanliness for its time. As originally built, it was powered by a 525 hp (391 kW) Napier Lion VIII and it first flew on 26 June 1926, but no order was forthcoming; this was partly because by the time it was evaluated, the Air Ministry did not favour the Lion as a fighter engine.

In May 1928, the machine was modified as a racer, with equi-span wings of 28 ft (8.53 m) and revised struts and ailerons; it was fitted with a 553 hp (412 kW) Lion. The machine was subsequently redesignated Avro 567 Avenger II.

The Avenger ended its days as an instructional airframe.

== Specifications (Avenger) ==
Data from The Complete Book of Fighters

General characteristics

- Crew: 1
- Length: 25 ft 6 in (7.77 m)
- Wingspan: 32 ft 0 in (9.75 m)
- Height: 10 ft 3 in (3.12 m)
- Wing area: 244 sq ft (22.7 m^{2})
- Empty weight: 2,368 lb (1,074 kg)
- Gross weight: 3,220 lb (1,461 kg)
- Powerplant: 1 × Napier Lion VIII or Lion IX W-12 liquid-cooled piston engine, 525 hp (391 kW) (Lion VIII)

553 hp (412 kW) (Lion IX)

- Propellers: 2-bladed fixed-pitch propeller

Performance

- Maximum speed: 180 mph (290 km/h, 160 kn)
- Cruise speed: 130 mph (210 km/h, 110 kn)
- Service ceiling: 22,000 ft (6,700 m)
- Rate of climb: 2,100 ft/min (11 m/s)

Armament

- Guns: provision for two machine-guns
