= Avro 501 =

British seaplane first flown in 1913

501
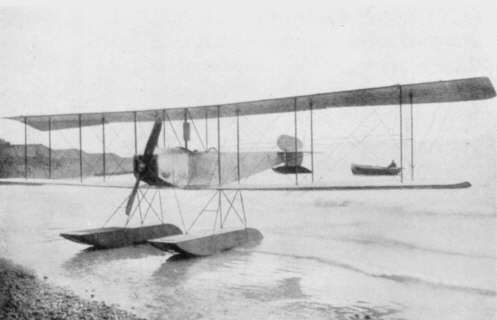

General information
- Type: Military utility seaplane
- National origin: United Kingdom
- Manufacturer: Avro
- Number built: 1 – 501; 4 – 503

History
- First flight: January 1913

The Avro Type H, Type 501, and Type 503 were a family of early British military seaplanes. They were a development of the Avro 500 design and were originally conceived as amphibious. The prototype was fitted with a single large main float (equipped with wheels) under the fuselage, and two outrigger floats under the wings.

== Design and development ==
Tests were conducted on Windermere in January 1913. It was later converted to a twin-float configuration and bought by the British Admiralty. However, it proved too heavy and was converted again – this time to a landplane.

An improved version, designated the 503, was demonstrated to the Inspector of Naval Aircraft, who placed an order for three machines. The prototype itself was demonstrated for the Imperial German Navy in its seaplane trials in June 1913 and was purchased by the government of the German Empire for evaluation purposes. This machine subsequently became the first aircraft to fly across the North Sea, from Wilhelmshaven to Heligoland, in September 1913. Gotha purchased a licence from Avro and produced the type as the WD.1 (Wasser Doppeldecker – "Water Biplane").

== Operators ==
Avro 501 No. 16, converted to landplane and delivered to the Royal Naval Air Service in January 1913. Used for training at Royal Naval Air Station Eastchurch.

German Empire

- Kaiserliche Marine – one aircraft.

United Kingdom

- Royal Naval Air Service

Turkey

- Ottoman Air Force

== Specifications (501 seaplane) ==
Data from Avro Aircraft since 1908

General characteristics

- Crew: 2
- Length: 33 ft 0 in (10.06 m)
- Wingspan: 47 ft 6 in (14.48 m)
- Height: 12 ft 6 in (3.81 m)
- Wing area: 478 sq ft (44.4 m^{2})
- Empty weight: 1,740 lb (789 kg)
- Gross weight: 2,700 lb (1,225 kg)
- Powerplant: 1 × Gnome Omega Omega 14-cyl two row air-cooled rotary piston engine , 100 hp (75 kW)

Performance

- Maximum speed: 55 mph (89 km/h, 48 kn)

== See also ==
Related lists

- List of aircraft of the Royal Naval Air Service
- List of flying boats and floatplanes
