= Avro 508 =

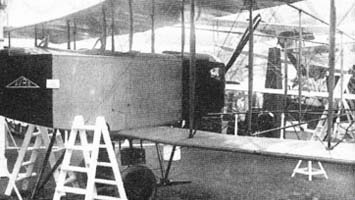

General information
- Type: Reconnaissance
- National origin: United Kingdom
- Manufacturer: A.V. Roe & Co. Ltd.
- Number built: 1

History
- First flight: April 1915

The Avro 508 was a prototype British reconnaissance aircraft of the 1910s.

== Development ==
The Avro 508 was built at Avro's Manchester works in December 1913 and assembled at Brooklands in January 1914. First exhibited in Manchester in January 1914, the 508 was a wooden fabric-covered pusher biplane of unusual shape, resembling a back-to-front Avro 504. Its top and bottom three-bay wings were equal in length, made of fabric-covered wood.

== Operational history ==
It was completed by March 1914, and shown at the Olympia Aero Show in London, however its first flight was at the start of official testing in April 1915 at Brooklands. The Royal Flying Corps showed no interest in the sole prototype and therefore the aircraft remained a training aircraft and engine tester at Hendon Aerodrome until it was dismantled in April 1916.

== Specifications ==
Data from Avro Aircraft since 1908

General characteristics

- Crew: two
- Length: 26 ft 9 in (8.15 m)
- Wingspan: 44 ft 0 in (13.41 m)
- Height: 10 ft 0 in (3.05 m)
- Wing area: 468 sq ft (43.5 m^{2})
- Empty weight: 1,000 lb (454 kg)
- Gross weight: 1,680 lb (762 kg)
- Powerplant: 1 × Gnome Monosoupape 7 Type A , 80 hp (60 kW)

Performance

- Maximum speed: 65 mph (105 km/h, 56 kn)
- Endurance: 4 1/2 hr
