= Avro Andover =

Andover
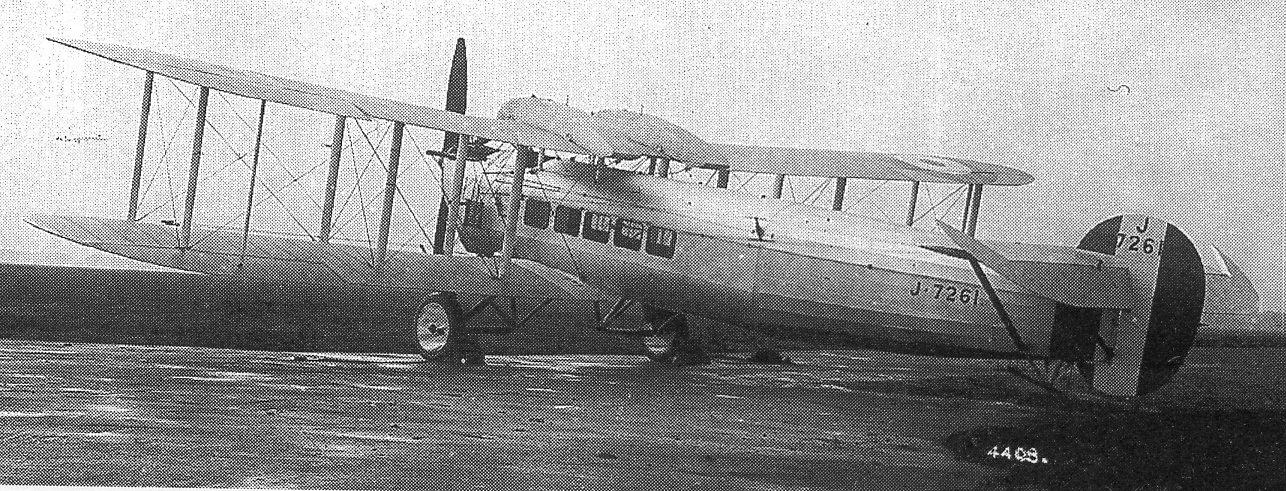
- First prototype Andover

General information
- Type: Passenger/air ambulance
- Manufacturer: Avro
- Primary users: Royal Air Force Imperial Airways
- Number built: 4

History
- First flight: 28 June 1924 (Type 561) March 1925 (Type 563)
- Developed from: Avro Aldershot

The Avro Andover was a 1920s British military transport aircraft built by Avro for the Royal Air Force. Four aircraft were built, in two versions. Three aircraft, the Type 561, were used as flying ambulances. The sole example of the Type 563 was used as a 12-seater transport.

== Design ==
At the beginning of the 1920s the Royal Air Force required a successor for the outdated Airco DH.10 Amiens on the Cairo to Baghdad "Desert Air Route". In response Avro designed and constructed the Avro Andover, a single-engined biplane designed to serve as a passenger plane and also as an air ambulance.

The fuselage was a steel tube frame covered with canvas and plywood. While the fuselage was a completely new design, the wings, undercarriage and the tail unit were taken from the Avro Aldershot bomber. The pilot and navigator sat in an open cockpit directly under the leading edge of the upper wing; a passageway led from the cockpit to the passenger cabin. The aircraft held twelve passengers (six on each side of the centre aisle) or six stretchers.

The most obvious characteristics of the Andover were the two large fuel tanks on the upper wings and the dual exhaust pipes of the Rolls-Royce Condor III engine.

== Operations ==
The first flight of the Andover was on 28 June 1924. Because the "Desert Air Route" was transferred to Imperial Airways, no order was placed by the RAF, so Avro manufactured only three Type 561, which were transferred to RAF Halton, location of Princess Mary's RAF Hospital. In spite of the lack of commercial success, a single Type 563 variant was developed by Avro, which had an additional washroom and a baggage compartment.

After test flights in March 1925 in Hamble and Gosport, this passenger aircraft was lent to Imperial Airways and made cross-channel trial flights in the summer of 1925. This was the first Avro aircraft to be used in airline service. Imperial Airways returned the aircraft to the RAF in January 1927.

== Operators ==
United Kingdom

- Royal Air Force
  - No. 99 Squadron RAF
- Imperial Airways

== Specifications (Type 561) ==
Data from Avro Aircraft since 1908

General characteristics

- Crew: 2
- Capacity: 12 passengers or 6 stretchers
- Length: 51 ft 3 in (15.62 m)
- Wingspan: 68 ft (21 m)
- Height: 15 ft 3 in (4.65 m)
- Wing area: 1,062 sq ft (98.7 m^{2})
- Empty weight: 6,980 lb (3,166 kg)
- Gross weight: 11,500 lb (5,216 kg)
- Powerplant: 1 × Rolls-Royce Condor III V-12 water-cooled piston engine, 695 hp (518 kW)
- Propellers: 2-bladed fixed-pitch propeller

Performance

- Maximum speed: 110 mph (180 km/h, 96 kn)
- Range: 460 mi (740 km, 400 nmi)
- Service ceiling: 13,500 ft (4,100 m)
