= Avro 523 Pike =

523 Pike
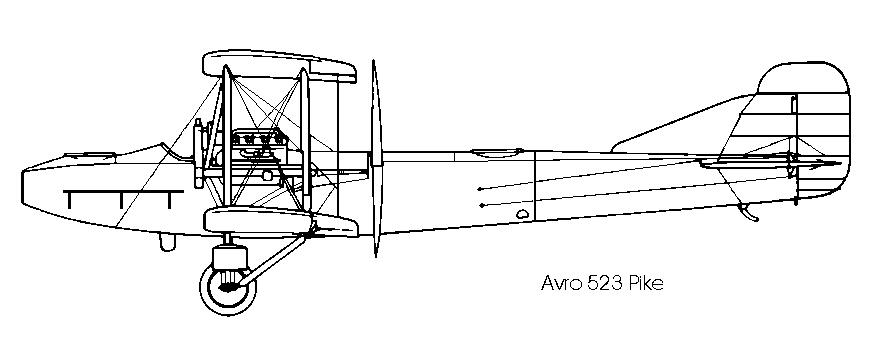

General information
- Type: Multi-role military aircraft
- Manufacturer: Avro
- Designer: Roy Chadwick
- Primary user: Avro
- Number built: 2

History
- First flight: May 1916

The Avro 523 Pike (the first Avro aircraft to receive a name) was a British multi-role combat aircraft of the First World War that did not progress past the prototype stage. It was intended to provide the Royal Naval Air Service with an anti-Zeppelin fighter that was also capable of long-range reconnaissance and bombing.

== Design and development ==
The Avro Pike was a large, three-bay biplane of conventional layout driven by two pusher propellers. Three open cockpits were provided, the centre one for the pilot, with gunners fore and aft of him. The Admiralty evaluated the type, but rejected it. Avro then built a second prototype, substituting the original's Sunbeam engines for Green E.6 engines instead and designated it the 523A.

== Operational history ==
The Admiralty evaluated this in November 1916, but found that the type was by then obsolete and did not place an order. The two prototypes flew as testbeds with Avro for the remainder of the war.

== Specifications (523) ==
Data from Avro Aircraft since 1908

General characteristics

- Crew: three, pilot and two gunners
- Length: 39 ft 1 in (11.91 m)
- Wingspan: 60 ft 0 in (18.29 m)
- Height: 11 ft 8 in (3.56 m)
- Wing area: 815 sq ft (75.71 m^{2})
- Empty weight: 4,000 lb (1,814 kg)
- Gross weight: 6,064 lb (2,751 kg)
- Powerplant: 2 × Sunbeam Nubian , 162 hp (121 kW) each

Performance

- Maximum speed: 97 mph (156 km/h, 84 kn)
- Endurance: 7 hours
- Rate of climb: 526 ft/min (2.67 m/s) (Note: Climb to 5,000 ft (1,524 m) in 9 min 30 sec.)

Armament

- 1 × flexible .303 in (7.7 mm) Lewis Gun in nose
- 1 × flexible .303 in (7.7 mm) Lewis gun in rear fuselage
- 2 × 112 lb (51 kg) bombs carried in internal bay
