= List of Avro Lancaster operators =

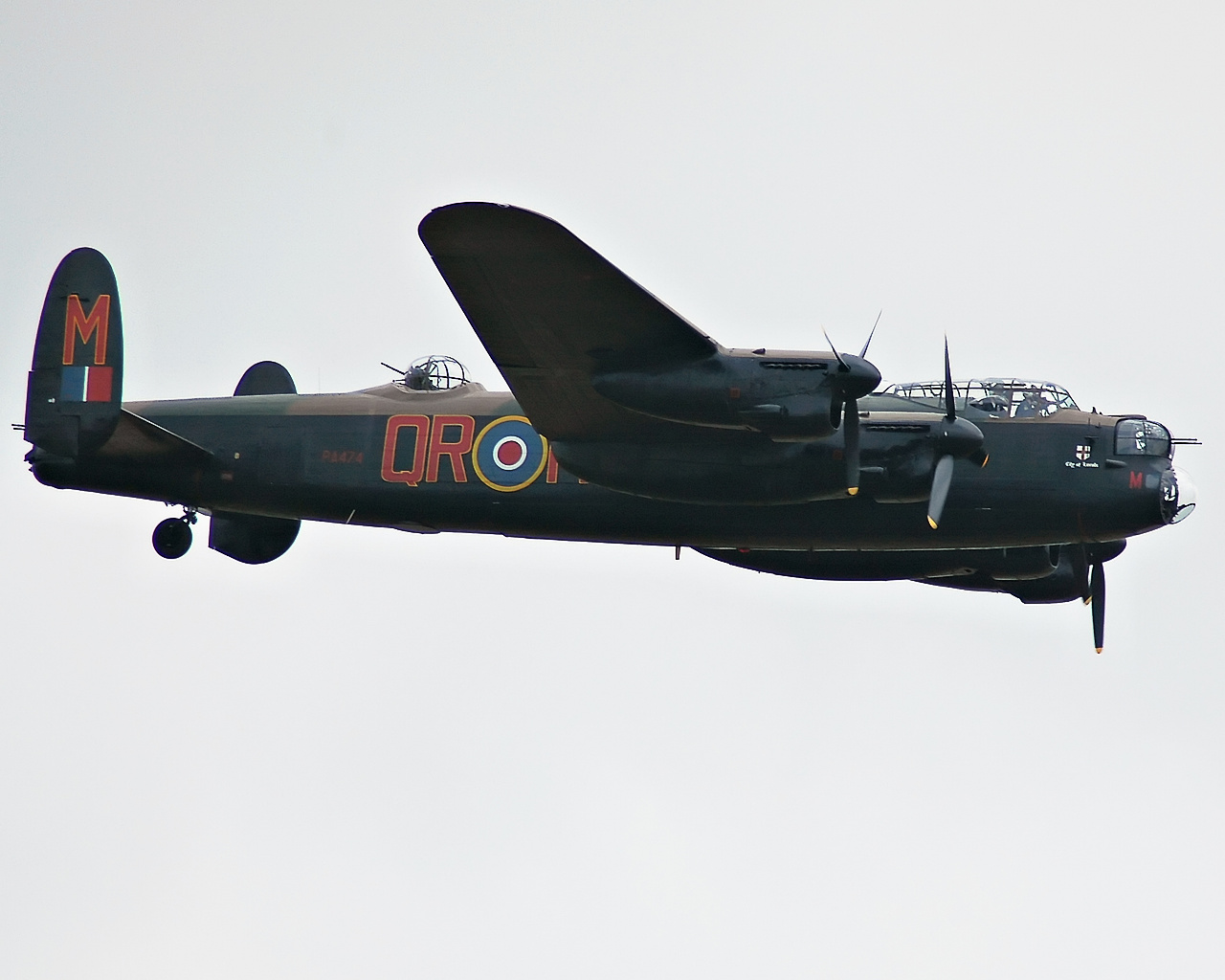

The following are operators of the Avro Lancaster:

== Military operators ==
=== Argentina ===
Argentine Air Force

From May 1948 to August 1949 the Argentine Air Force received 15 Lancasters (registered B-031 to B-045) previously operated by RAF.

=== Australia ===
Royal Australian Air Force

- No. 460 Squadron RAAF
- No. 463 Squadron RAAF
- No. 467 Squadron RAAF

=== Canada ===
Royal Canadian Air Force

- No. 6 Group RCAF (Wartime to 1945)
  - 405 Squadron
  - 408 Squadron
  - 419 Squadron
  - 420 Squadron
  - 424 Squadron
  - 425 Squadron
  - 426 Squadron
  - 427 Squadron
  - 428 Squadron
  - 429 Squadron
  - 431 Squadron
  - 432 Squadron
  - 433 Squadron
  - 434 Squadron
- 10 Group/Maritime Air Command(Post 1947)
  - 103 Rescue Unit
  - 2 Maritime (M) Operational Training Unit
  - 404 Maritime Reconnaissance/Patrol Squadron
  - 405 Maritime Reconnaissance/Patrol Squadron
  - 407 Maritime Reconnaissance/Patrol Squadron
- CFB Rockcliffe(Postwar)
  - 408 Aerial Photography/Arctic Reconnaissance Squadron
  - 413 Aerial Photography Squadron

=== Egypt ===
Royal Egyptian Air Force

=== France ===
Aeronavale – 54 transferred from the Royal Australian Air Force beginning in 1952

- Escadrille 5S
- Escadrille 9S
- Escadrille 10S
- Escadrille 55S
- Escadrille 56S

=== Poland ===
Polish Air Forces on exile in Great Britain

- No. 300 Polish Bomber Squadron "Ziemi Mazowieckiej"

=== Soviet Union ===
Soviet Naval Aviation

Soviets were able to repair two of six Avro Lancasters which made forced landings near Yagodnik airfield, near Arkhangelsk during attacks on the German battleship Tirpitz. Both ex-617 Squadron Avro Lancasters were operated briefly as transports and long range reconnaissance aircraft before being retired due to lack of spare parts.

=== Sweden ===
Swedish Air Force

- Försökscentralen (Swedish Test Establishment) at Malmen near Linköping received one Lancaster I (ex-RAF RA805) designated Tp 80 and the SwAF/n 80001. Aircraft was modified by Avro company for jet engine testbed duties and delivered from UK in May 1951. The only Swedish Lancaster crashed in 1956.

=== United Kingdom ===
Royal Air Force

- No. 7 Squadron RAF
- No. 9 Squadron RAF
- No. 12 Squadron RAF
- No. 15 Squadron RAF
- No. 18 Squadron RAF
- No. 20 Squadron RAF
- No. 35 Squadron RAF
- No. 37 Squadron RAF
- No. 38 Squadron RAF
- No. 40 Squadron RAF
- No. 44 Squadron RAF
- No. 49 Squadron RAF
- No. 50 Squadron RAF
- No. 57 Squadron RAF
- No. 61 Squadron RAF
- No. 70 Squadron RAF
- No. 75 Squadron RAF
- No. 82 Squadron RAF
- No. 83 Squadron RAF
- No. 90 Squadron RAF
- No. 97 Squadron RAF
- No. 100 Squadron RAF
- No. 101 Squadron RAF
- No. 103 Squadron RAF
- No. 104 Squadron RAF
- No. 106 Squadron RAF
- No. 109 Squadron RAF
- No. 115 Squadron RAF
- No. 120 Squadron RAF
- No. 138 Squadron RAF
- No. 148 Squadron RAF
- No. 149 Squadron RAF
- No. 150 Squadron RAF
- No. 153 Squadron RAF
- No. 156 Squadron RAF
- No. 160 Squadron RAF
- No. 166 Squadron RAF
- No. 170 Squadron RAF
- No. 178 Squadron RAF
- No. 179 Squadron RAF
- No. 186 Squadron RAF
- No. 189 Squadron RAF
- No. 195 Squadron RAF
- No. 203 Squadron RAF
- No. 207 Squadron RAF
- No. 210 Squadron RAF
- No. 214 Squadron RAF
- No. 218 Squadron RAF
- No. 224 Squadron RAF
- No. 227 Squadron RAF
- No. 231 Squadron RAF
- No. 279 Squadron RAF
- No. 514 Squadron RAF
- No. 541 Squadron RAF
- No. 550 Squadron RAF
- No. 576 Squadron RAF
- No. 582 Squadron RAF
- No. 617 Squadron RAF
- No. 619 Squadron RAF
- No. 621 Squadron RAF
- No. 622 Squadron RAF
- No. 625 Squadron RAF
- No. 626 Squadron RAF
- No. 630 Squadron RAF
- No. 635 Squadron RAF
- No. 683 Squadron RAF
- No. 1651 Heavy Conversion Unit RAF
- No. 1653 Heavy Conversion Unit RAF
- No. 1654 Heavy Conversion Unit RAF
- No. 1656 Heavy Conversion Unit RAF
- No. 1657 Heavy Conversion Unit RAF
- No. 1659 Heavy Conversion Unit RAF
- No. 1660 Heavy Conversion Unit RAF
- No. 1661 Heavy Conversion Unit RAF
- No. 1662 Heavy Conversion Unit RAF
- No. 1664 Heavy Conversion Unit RAF
- No. 1665 Heavy Conversion Unit RAF
- No. 1666 Heavy Conversion Unit RAF
- No. 1667 Heavy Conversion Unit RAF
- No. 1668 Heavy Conversion Unit RAF
- No. 1678 Heavy Conversion Unit RAF
- No. 1 Lancaster Finishing School RAF
- No. 3 Lancaster Finishing School RAF
- No. 5 Lancaster Finishing School RAF
- No. 6 Lancaster Finishing School RAF
- No. 6 Operational Training Unit RAF
- No. 230 Operational Conversion Unit RAF
- No. 236 Operational Conversion Unit RAF

Fleet Air Arm

- 780 Naval Air Squadron

== Civil operators ==
=== Argentina ===
- Flota Aérea Mercante Argentina

=== Canada ===
- Spartan Air Services
- Trans-Canada Air Lines
- World Wide Airways

=== United Kingdom ===
- British European Airways
- British Overseas Airways Corporation (BOAC)
- British South American Airways
- Flight Refuelling Limited
- Skyways Limited

== See also ==
- Avro Lancaster
