= Avro 641 Commodore =

Commodore
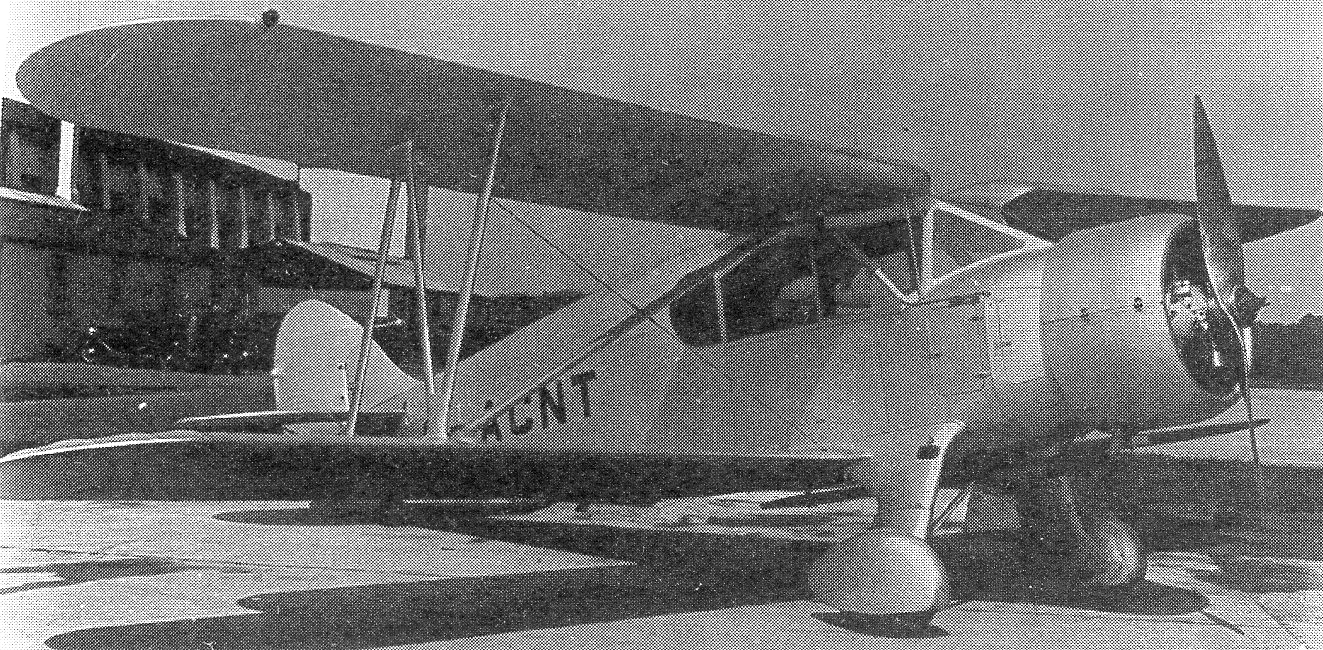

General information
- Type: Tourer
- National origin: United Kingdom
- Manufacturer: Avro
- Number built: 6

History
- Introduction date: 24 May 1934
- First flight: 1934
- Retired: 1942

The Avro 641 Commodore was a British single-engine five-seat cabin biplane built by Avro in the mid-1930s for private use. A total of only six were built, including the prototype.

== Design and development ==
After building the three seat Avro 639 Cabin Cadet, Avro then designed a larger, five seat cabin biplane, the Avro 641 Commodore. The Commodore had a similar steel tube structure to the Tutor, with heavily staggered single bay wings and a spatted undercarriage. The first Commodore was delivered to its owner on 24 May 1934.

== Operational history ==
Only six Commodores were built, with one being sold to the Maharajah of Vizianagram. This was found to be unsuitable for Indian conditions and was returned to Britain and scrapped. Two were sold to private owners in Egypt and were later taken over by the Egyptian Army Air Force.

The two Commodores that remained in service in England on the outbreak of World War II were impressed into service with the Royal Air Force and the Air Transport Auxiliary. One crashed fatally in 1941, with the last being struck off charge in 1942.

== Operators ==
Egypt

- Egyptian Army Air Force

United Kingdom

- Air Transport Auxiliary
- Royal Air Force

== Specifications (Commodore) ==
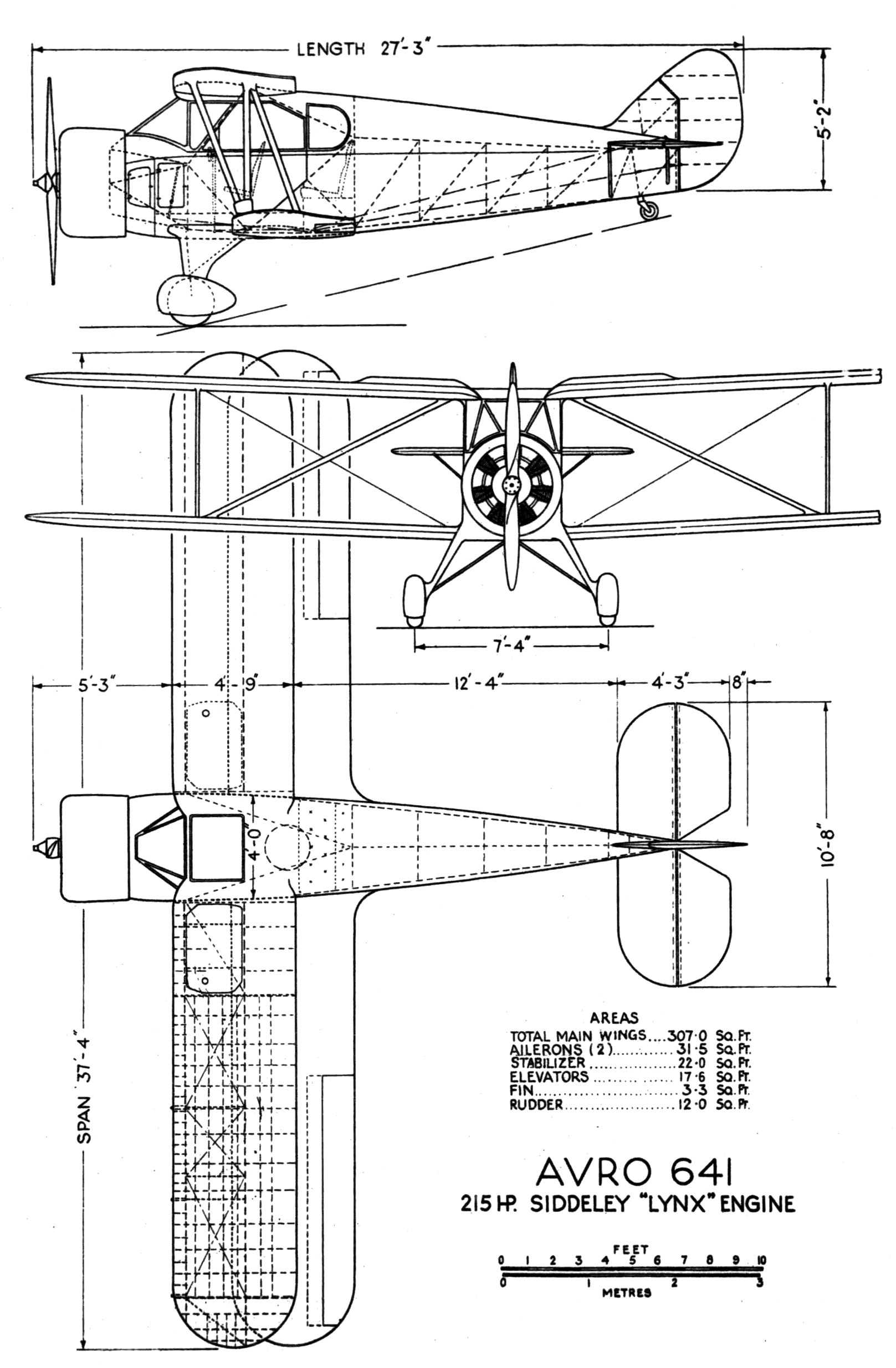
Avro 641 Commodore 3-view drawing from NACA-AC-193

Data from Avro Aircraft since 1908

General characteristics

- Crew: 1
- Capacity: 4 pax
- Length: 27 ft 3 in (8.31 m)
- Wingspan: 37 ft 4 in (11.38 m)
- Height: 10 ft 0 in (3.05 m)
- Wing area: 307 sq ft (28.5 m^{2})
- Empty weight: 2,237 lb (1,015 kg)
- Gross weight: 3,500 lb (1,588 kg)
- Fuel capacity: 50 imp gal (60 US gal; 227 L)
- Powerplant: 1 × Armstrong Siddeley Lynx IVC 7-cylinder air-cooled radial piston engine, 215 hp (160 kW)
- Propellers: 2-bladed Fairey-Reed fixed-pitch metal propeller

Performance

- Maximum speed: 130 mph (210 km/h, 110 kn)
- Cruise speed: 110 mph (180 km/h, 96 kn)
- Range: 500 mi (800 km, 430 nmi)
- Service ceiling: 11,500 ft (3,500 m)
- Rate of climb: 700 ft/min (3.6 m/s)
- Wing loading: 11.4 lb/sq ft (56 kg/m^{2})
- Power/mass: 0.061 hp/lb (0.100 kW/kg)

== See also ==
Related lists

- List of aircraft of the Royal Air Force
