= Avro 521 =

British two-seat fighter plane

General information
- Type: Fighter
- Manufacturer: Avro
- Number built: 1

History
- First flight: late 1915

The Avro 521 was a British two-seat fighter first flown in late 1915, based on the 504. Only a prototype of the Avro 521 was built. It was powered by a 110 hp (80 kW) Clerget engine, with provision for a .303 in (7.7 mm) Lewis Gun in the rear cockpit.

== Operational history ==
The prototype underwent trials with the RFC in early 1916, and 25 aircraft were subsequently ordered. However, this contract was cancelled, and there is no evidence of any other Avro 521 being built. The prototype crashed at Central Flying School Upavon on 21 September 1916, killing pilot Lieutenant W.H.S. Garnett.

== Specifications ==
Data from Avro Aircraft since 1908

General characteristics

- Crew: 2
- Length: 28 ft 2 in (8.59 m)
- Wingspan: 30 ft 0 in (9.14 m)
- Height: 9 ft 10 in (3.00 m)
- Wing area: 266 sq ft (24.7 m^{2})
- Empty weight: 1,150 lb (522 kg)
- Gross weight: 1,995 lb (905 kg)
- Powerplant: 1 × Clerget 9Z 9-cylinder air-cooled rotary piston engine, 110 hp (82 kW)
- Propellers: 2-bladed fixed-pitch propeller

Performance

- Maximum speed: 94.6 mph (152.2 km/h, 82.2 kn)
- Endurance: 4 hours 30 minutes
- Time to altitude: 14 min to 6,000 ft (1,800 m)

Armament

- Guns: 1 × rear mounted .303 in (7.7 mm) Lewis Gun
