= Brownsfield Mill =

Listed former cotton mill in Manchester, England

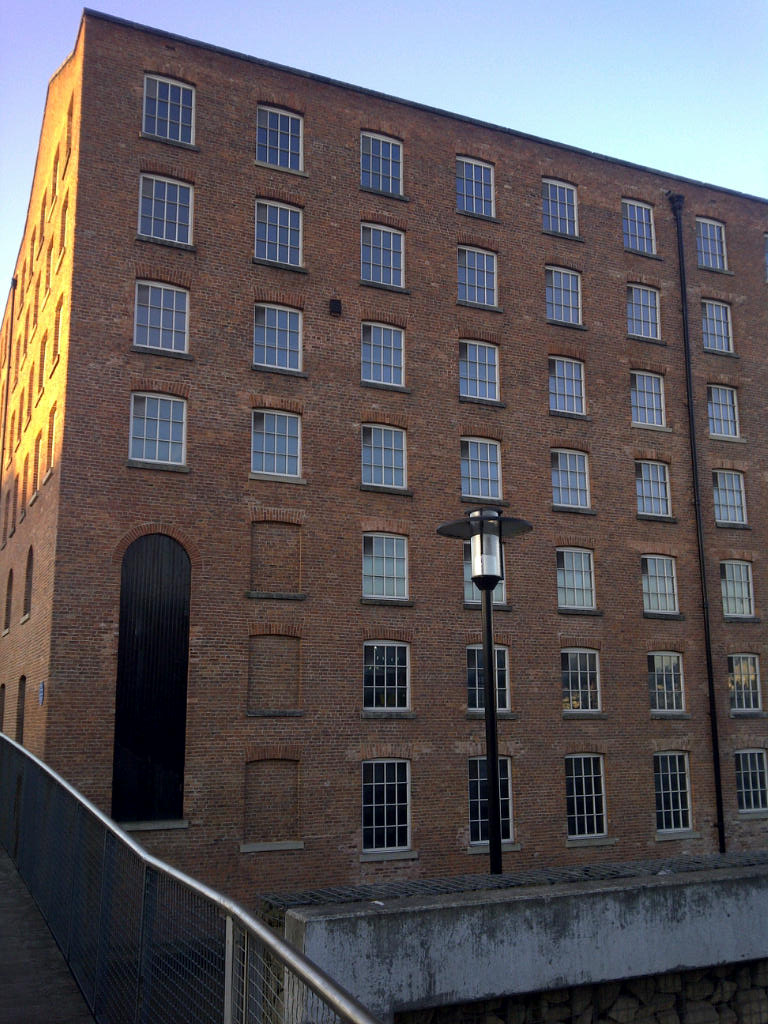
- The mill in 2012

Cotton
- Alternative names: Gerrard's Mill, Avro
- Location: Binns Place, Ancoats, Manchester, England
- Coordinates: 53°28′56″N 2°13′44″W

Construction
- Built: c. 1825
- Completed: 1831
- Floor count: 7

Equipment

Listed Building – Grade II*
- Official name: Brownsfield Mill
- Designated: 11 November 1988
- Reference no.: 1207994

Brownsfield Mill is a Grade II* listed former room and cotton-spinning power mill on Binns Place in Ancoats, an area of Manchester, England. Built around 1825 and later extended to form an L‑shaped plan, it retains what is considered the oldest surviving mill chimney in the city. After its early decades as a cotton‑spinning mill under a succession of occupiers, the building housed the A. V. Roe and Company aviation works in the 1910s. Following further periods of varied industrial use, it was restored in the 21st century, with redevelopment completed as the Avro residential scheme.

== History ==
The mill was constructed around 1825, according to its official listing, and was extended shortly afterwards to produce an L‑shaped plan. (Note: The architectural historian Clare Hartwell states it was built in 1825.) Construction was completed in 1831, and the mill was first occupied by Nehemiah Gerrard and his son, makers of sewing cotton, and it was originally known as Gerrard's Mill.

Between 1837 and 1850 the mill was occupied by Binns & Co, who carried out bleaching, dyeing and cotton spinning. Local tax records list the firm as both owner and occupier, and there is no evidence of any activity at the mill other than cotton spinning during this period.

From 1858 to 1870 the mill continued to operate as a cotton factory under Fairweather & Williams. Between 1870 and 1910, records show a mix of short‑term tenants, reflecting the impact of the Cotton Famine, which forced many firms to close and led the owners to let out individual floors to various new occupants, including clothing manufacturers rather than cotton spinners.

On 1 January 1910, the aviation company Avro was founded in the basement of Brownsfield Mill, where limited space meant early aircraft had to be built, taken apart and carried out in pieces for transport to Brooklands. Despite the cramped conditions, the mill saw the creation of notable early designs, and Avro also supplied parts to other flyers, becoming known as "The Aviator's Storehouse". After becoming a limited company in 1913 and receiving orders for the Avro 500, the firm left Brownsfield Mill for larger premises on Clifton Street.

On 11 November 1988, Brownsfield Mill was designated a Grade II* listed building.

In 2008 Town Centre Securities carried out grant‑funded repair work at the mill, including brick repointing, roof and window repairs, and asbestos removal, preparing the building for redevelopment. In 2017 the property development business Urban Splash took the scheme forward as "Avro", with plans to restore the former A. V. Roe and Company premises and create 31 loft apartments and a three‑storey townhouse formed from the old engine room. In 2023 the restoration won the RIBA North West Award and the RIBA North West Conservation Award.

== Architecture ==
The mill, constructed of brick with most sides rendered and topped with slate roofs, has a seven‑storey main block from about 1825 set alongside the Rochdale Canal. It has small arched windows, an engine house marked by arched openings at the south‑west end, and a narrow privy tower on the north side with taking‑in doors on the lower floors. A slightly later six‑storey wing, set at right angles and likely used for storage, includes a tall loading bay and a stair and privy tower containing the chimney, now considered the oldest surviving mill chimney in Manchester. The boilers were probably housed in a separate fire‑resistant room below yard level, and inside the building cast‑iron columns support heavy timber beams and floorboards. The architectural historian Clare Hartwell describes it as "unusually complete and well preserved".

== See also ==
- Grade II* listed buildings in Greater Manchester
- Listed buildings in Manchester-M1

== Bibliography ==
- Hartwell, Clare (2002). Pevsner Architectural Guides: Manchester. Yale University Press.
