= Avro 500 =

Early British military aircraft

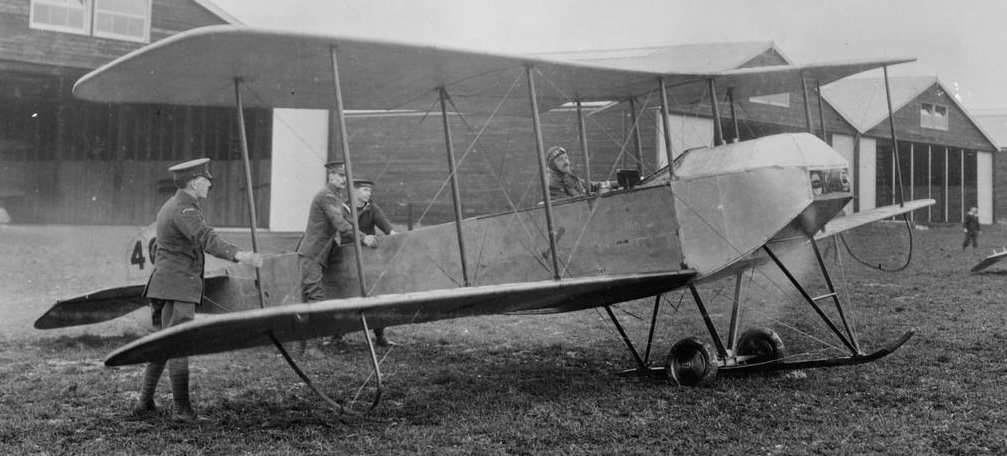
- Avro 500

General information
- Type: Military utility aircraft
- Manufacturer: Avro
- Designer: A.V. Roe
- Primary user: United Kingdom
- Number built: 18

History
- Introduction date: 1912
- First flight: 3 March 1912

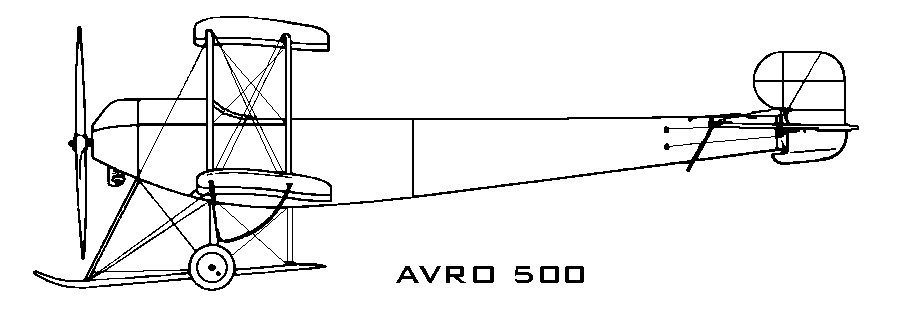

The Avro Type E, Type 500, and Type 502 made up a family of early British military aircraft, regarded by Alliott Verdon Roe as his firm's first truly successful design. It was a forerunner of the Avro 504, one of the outstanding aircraft of the First World War.

== Development ==
The Type E biplane was designed in parallel with the slightly earlier Avro Duigan, differing principally in being slightly larger and having a more powerful (60 horsepower (45 kW)) water-cooled E.N.V. engine. Both were two-bay tractor biplanes with unstaggered parallel-chord wings with rounded tips, a deep rectangular section fuselage bearing rectangular steel-framed stabilisers, elevators and rudder with no fixed fin, and an undercarriage with a pair of wheels on a transverse leaf-spring and a long central skid projecting forward of the propeller. This aircraft layout dominated aircraft design for twenty years: the Avro 500 and the contemporary B.E.1 are among the first truly practical examples built.

=== Avro Duigan ===
Duigan
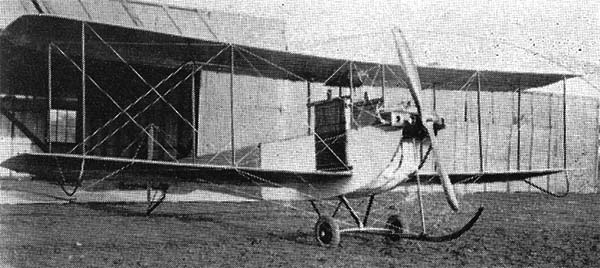

General information
- Type: 2 seat biplane
- National origin: UK
- Manufacturer: A.V Roe & Co
- Designer: A.V. Roe
- Number built: 1

History
- First flight: March 1912
- Variant: Avro 500

The Avro Duigan was a single-seat tractor biplane built by A.V. Roe for the pioneer Australian aviator John Robertson Duigan in 1911. Roe's first biplane design, the Avro Type D had first flown in April 1911. The Avro Duigan was a major refinement of this fundamentally successful aircraft. It had a square rather than triangular cross section fuselage, simplifying construction and allowing the crew seats to be lower down, giving more protection. The wings were supported using an aerodynamically cleaner ordinary two-bay layout, replacing the two and a half bay arrangement of its predecessor, which had a third pair of interplane struts close to the fuselage. The undercarriage was simpler, a V-strut below the wing leading edge bearing a leaf-spring axle whose wheels had the refinement of covered spokes, and under this a single long skid supported by a second V-strut below the trailing edge and a single strut from the extreme nose of the aircraft. The tailplane was steel framed, with a rectangular fixed stabiliser and elevator and rudder. Other details were as previous aircraft. The fuselage was constructed of wire-braced ash metal covered forward of the cockpits. The observer sat in front with the pilot sitting behind the cut away trailing edge, an arrangement which positioned the front cockpit close to the centre of gravity of the aircraft and allowed it to be flown without a passenger with no change its balance. The wire-braced high aspect ratio two-bay wings had ash spars and poplar ribs with the curved ends formed from cane. Lateral control was by wing warping. A sprung tailskid was mounted below the rudder and small hoops were fitted below the outer interplane struts to protect the wingtips. The aircraft had dual controls and was fitted with small "Cellon" window to improve downward vision.

The aircraft was initially powered by a 40 hp (30 kW) two-cylinder horizontally opposed Alvaston but soon replaced by a 35 hp (26 kW) E.N.V. V-8 motor. Both were water-cooled engines, with pairs of large coiled tube radiators positioned parallel to the fuselage on either side of the front cockpit.

Trials with the Alvaston engine at Huntingdon race course were not successful, the aircraft barely lifting off. On his return to Brooklands, the E.N.V. motor was fitted and on 10 March 1912 Duigan, flying solo managed some long, straight flights in his too-evidently underpowered machine. Some intensive engine tuning, together with a new propeller resulted in more success that April, with solo circuits, figures of eight, and an hour-long series of circuits at about 500 ft (150 m). Nonetheless, Duigan won his Aviator's Certificate and returned to Australia. His aircraft, without its engine, was sold to the Lakes Aircraft Co. who rebuilt it as the Lakes Sea Bird floatplane in October 1912, powered by a 50 h (37 kW ) Gnome engine. In this form, it performed well. The slightly larger Avro 500, powered by a 60 hp (45 kW) E.N.V. was the first Avro aircraft type to be built in any quantity.

== Specifications (Type E) ==
Data from Avro Aircraft since 1908

General characteristics

- Crew: 1
- Capacity: 1
- Length: 30 ft 6 in (9.30 m)
- Wingspan: 36 ft 0 in (10.97 m)
- Wing area: 330 sq ft (31 m^{2})
- Empty weight: 1,100 lb (499 kg)
- Gross weight: 1,650 lb (748 kg)
- Powerplant: 1 × E.N.V. Type D 4-cylinder water-cooled in-line piston engine
- Propellers: 2-bladed Avro fixed-pitch propeller

Performance

- Maximum speed: 50 mph (80 km/h, 43 kn)
- Endurance: 6 hours
- Rate of climb: 170 ft/min (0.86 m/s)

== Avro 500 ==
The aircraft was first flown on 3 March 1912 by Wilfred Parke, and while top speed and rate of climb did not meet expectations, the aircraft excelled in every other way. However, its performance was not up to Roe's expectations, and a second example was built, modified to take the much lighter 50 hp (37 kW) Gnome air-cooled rotary engine. This first flew on 8 May 1912, and a height of 2,000 ft (610 m) was reached in five minutes. The next day the aircraft was flown from Brooklands to Laffan's Plain, covering the 17 miles (28 km) in 20 minutes. The same day it demonstrated its ability to meet the requirements laid down by the War Office in the requirements for a "Military Aircraft" that had been published in connection with the forthcoming Military Aeroplane Competition, and the authorities were impressed enough to buy the aircraft and placed an order for two more examples of the aircraft, which Roe now renamed the Avro 500.

== Service ==
The type proved an immediate success in service, and orders for another four machines plus five single-seat derivatives (designated the Type 502 by Avro) soon followed. Other examples produced included six for the British Admiralty's Air Department, one presented to the government of Portugal (paid for by public subscription), one kept by Avro as a company demonstrator, and one bought by a private individual, J. Laurence Hall, which was commandeered by the War Office at the outbreak of World War I). The first prototype was destroyed in a crash on 29 June 1913 that killed its student pilot. Avro 500s were flown by the British armed forces during the first years of the war, mostly as trainers. In service, most were fitted with ailerons and a revised rudder.

== Operators ==
Portugal

- Portuguese Air Force

United Kingdom

- Royal Flying Corps
  - No. 3 Squadron RFC
  - No. 4 Squadron RFC
  - No. 5 Squadron RFC
- Royal Naval Air Service

== Specifications (Avro 500) ==
Data from Avro Aircraft since 1909

General characteristics

- Crew: one pilot
- Capacity: one seat for observer, instructor, or passenger
- Length: 29 ft 0 in (8.84 m)
- Wingspan: 36 ft 0 in (10.97 m)
- Height: 9 ft 9 in (2.97 m)
- Wing area: 330 sq ft (30.7 m^{2})
- Empty weight: 900 lb (409 kg)
- Gross weight: 1,300 lb (590 kg)
- Powerplant: 1 × Gnome rotary , 50 hp (37 kW)

Performance

- Maximum speed: 61 mph (98 km/h, 53 kn)
- Rate of climb: 440 ft/min (2.2 m/s)

== Bibliography ==
- Jackson, A. J. Avro Aircraft since 1908. London:Putnam, 1990. ISBN 0-85177-834-8.
- Lewis. P. British Aircraft 1809-1914. London: Putnam, 1962.
- Lopes, Mario C. (November 1999). "Les avions Avro au Portugal: des inconnu aux plus célèbres" [Portuguese Avro Aircraft: From the Unknown to the Most Famous]. Avions: Toute l'Aéronautique et Son Histoire (in French) (80): 36–41. ISSN 1243-8650.
- World Aircraft Information Files, File 889 Sheet 92. London: BrightStar
