= AD Flying Boat =

British Admiralty Air Department patrol aircraft

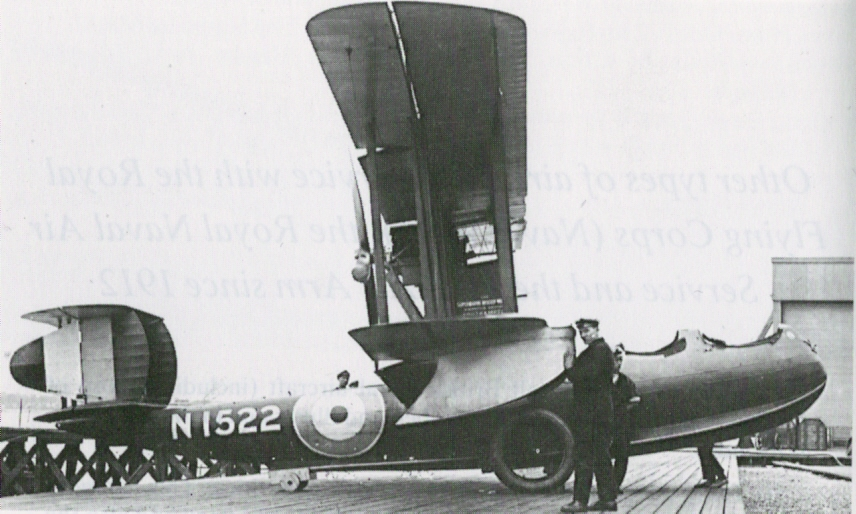
- An Air Department Flying Boat used by the Royal Naval Air Service (RNAS)

General information
- Type: Patrol Flying boat/Civil Transport
- Manufacturer: Pemberton-Billing Ltd. (later Supermarine Aviation Works)
- Designer: Linton Hope
- Primary user: Royal Navy
- Number built: 27

History
- First flight: 1916
- Developed into: Supermarine Baby

The AD Flying Boat was designed by the British Admiralty's Air Department to serve as a patrol aircraft that could operate in conjunction with Royal Navy warships. Intended for use during the First World War, production of the aircraft was terminated as the end of the war came into sight, and the type saw little operational use. A number were repurchased after the end of the war by Supermarine Aviation and rebuilt as civil transports, becoming known as the Supermarine Channel.

== Design and development ==
Designed in 1915 by the British yacht designer Linton Hope, the aircraft was of conventional biplane flying-boat configuration, and also featured a biplane tail with twin fins and rudders. The pilot and observer sat in tandem in the nose, with the engine and pusher propeller mounted behind them, between the wings. The wings could be folded forwards to facilitate shipboard stowage.

Two prototypes were constructed in 1916 by Pemberton-Billing Ltd (later to become Supermarine Aviation Works). The first prototype was intended to be powered by a 150 hp (112 kW) Sunbeam Nubian engine, but as this was not ready to use, a 200 horsepower (150 kW) Hispano-Suiza 8 was substituted. The aircraft performed poorly both on the water and in the air, demonstrating severe fore and aft vibration during take-off, while subject to excessive yaw during flight. After these problems were solved by producing revised versions of the hull, and the fin and rudder, the AD Flying Boat was able to be ordered into production. A total of 80 aircraft were ordered, and 27 machines were built. Examples were tested with Sunbeam Arab and Wolseley Python engines.

== Supermarine Channel ==
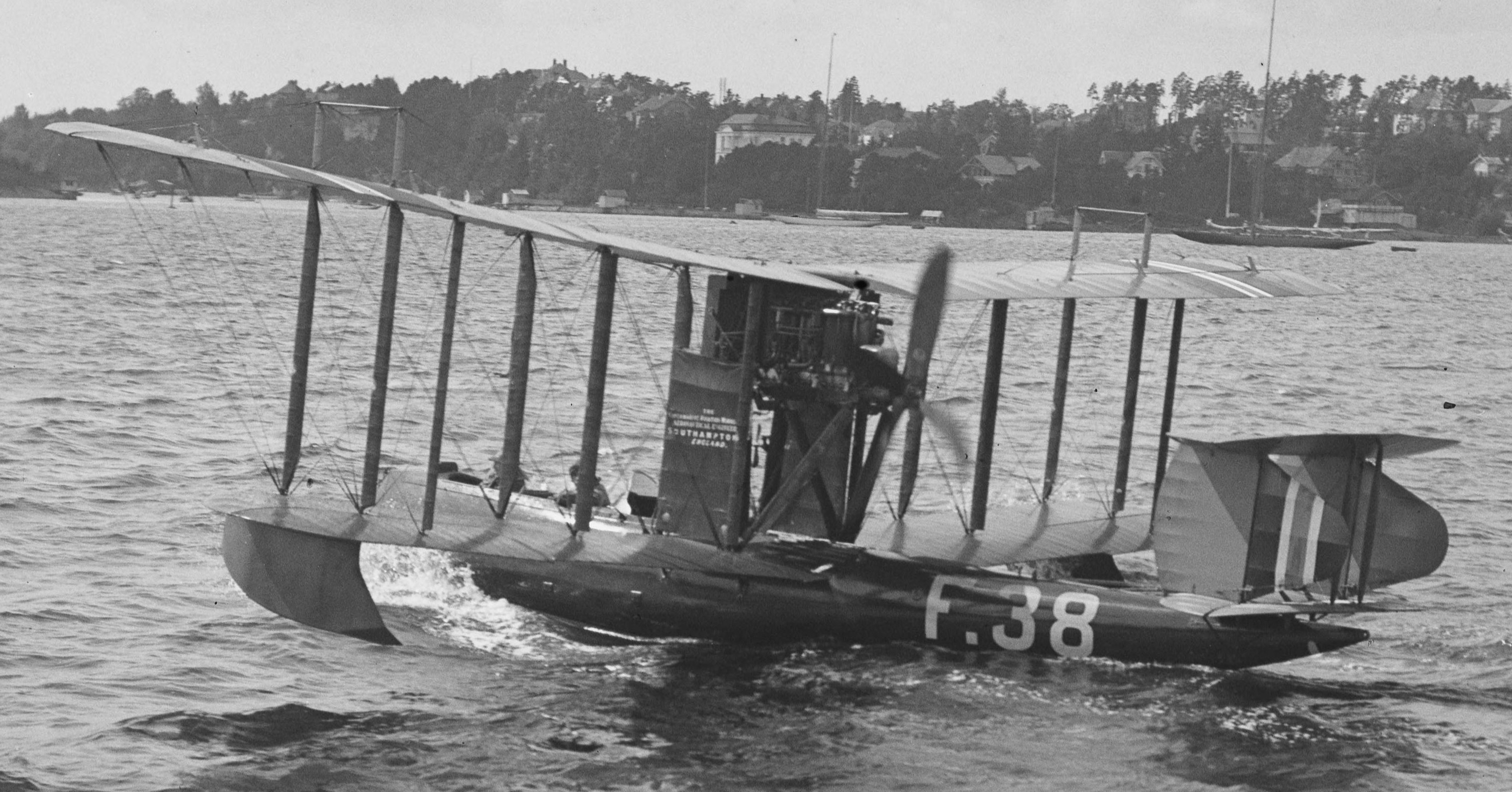
A Supermarine Channel with the Norwegian airline Det Norske Luftfartsrederi in 1920.

Following the Armistice, Supermarine purchased 19 of these AD Flying Boats to modify them for the civil market as the Supermarine Channel. The Channel I was powered with a 160 horsepower (120 kW) Beardmore 160 hp engines, and the Channel II was fitted with a 240 horsepower (180 kW) Armstrong Siddeley Puma engine. The reconfigured flying-boats provided accommodation for a pilot and three passengers in three open cockpits.

== Operators ==
=== Military operators ===
Chile

- Chilean Air Force - One aircraft.
- Chilean Navy acquired one Channel with modified hull (similar to the Supermarine Seal II) in 1922.

Japan

- Imperial Japanese Navy purchased three Channels.

Norway

- Royal Norwegian Navy Air Service purchased four Beardmore engined Channels in 1920, acquiring a further ex-civil aircraft. One remained in service until 1928.

Sweden

- Royal Swedish Navy purchased a single Channel in 1921, it being destroyed during testing.

United Kingdom

- Royal Navy
  - Royal Naval Air Service operated AD Flying Boat.

=== Civil operators ===
Norway

- Det Norske Luftfartsrederi, Channel Mk I

== Specifications (AD Flying Boat) ==
Data from British Aeroplanes 1914-18

General characteristics

- Crew: two, pilot and observer
- Length: 30 ft 7 in (9.32 m)
- Upper wingspan: 50 ft 4 in (15.34 m)
- Lower wingspan: 37 ft 7 1/4 in (11.462 m)
- Height: 13 ft 1 in (3.99 m)
- Wing area: 479 sq ft (44.5 m^{2})
- Empty weight: 2,508 lb (1,138 kg)
- Gross weight: 3,567 lb (1,618 kg)
- Powerplant: 1 × Hispano-Suiza 8 water-cooled V8 engine, 200 hp (150 kW)

Performance

- Maximum speed: 100 mph (160 km/h, 87 kn) at 2,000 ft (610 m)
- Endurance: 4 1/2 hr
- Service ceiling: 11,000 ft (3,400 m)
- Time to altitude: 30 min to 10,000 ft (3,050 m)

Armament

- Guns: 1 × .303 in (7.7 mm) Lewis gun on flexible mount for observer
- Bombs: small bomb load

== See also ==
- Sempill Mission

Related lists

- List of aircraft of the Royal Naval Air Service

== Sources ==
- Andrews, Charles Ferdinand; Morgan, Eric B. (1981). Supermarine Aircraft since 1914. London: Putnam. ISBN 978-03701-0-018-0.
- Bruce, J. M. (1957). British Aeroplanes 1914–18. London: Putnam. ISBN 978-03700-0-038-1.
- London, Peter (2003). British Flying Boats. Stroud, UK: Sutton Publishing. ISBN 978-0-7509-2695-9.
- Nerdrum, Johan (1986). Fugl Fønix: En beretning om Det Norske Luftfartselskap (in Norwegian). Oslo: Gyldendal Norsk Forlag. ISBN 82-05-16663-3.
