= Wettre =

Wettre is a surname. Notable people with the surname include:

- Petter Wettre (born 1967), Norwegian musician and composer
- Ragnar Wettre (1864–1940), Norwegian businessman
- Trygve Wettre (1874–1936), Norwegian businessman, brother of Ragnar
