= Vickers Viking =

1919 flying boat family

Viking/Vulture/Vanellus
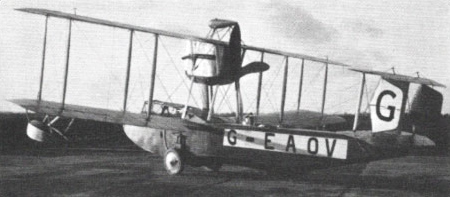
- Vickers Viking prototype in 1919

General information
- Type: Biplane amphibian
- Manufacturer: Vickers / Canadian Vickers
- Status: retired
- Primary user: Royal Canadian Air Force
- Number built: 31 (Viking); 2 (Vulture); 1 (Vanellus)

History
- Manufactured: 1919–1924
- First flight: 1919

The Vickers Viking was a British single-engine pusher amphibious biplane designed shortly after World War I. The final versions were renamed the Vulture and Vanellus.

== Design and development ==
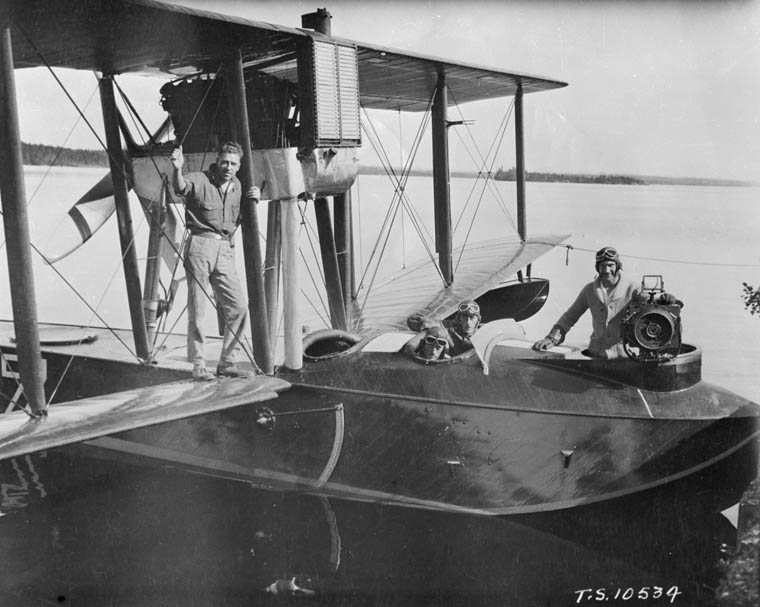
Vickers Viking IV model 85 of the Royal Canadian Air Force in 1926

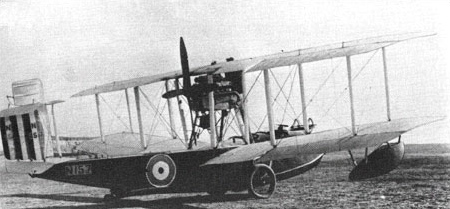
Royal Air Force Vickers Viking V

Research on Vickers' first amphibious aircraft began in December 1918 with tests of alternative hull designs occurring in an experimental tank at St Albans in Hertfordshire. A prototype, registered G-EAOV, was a five-seat cabin biplane with a pusher propeller driven by a 275 hp (205 kW) Rolls-Royce Falcon III water-cooled V 12 engine.

The next example, G-EASC, known as the Viking II, had a greater wing span, significant detail improvements, particularly to the hull, undercarriage and rudders, and a 360 hp (270 kW) Rolls-Royce Eagle VIII motor that was no longer faired into the top wing, while additional struts braced the centre section.

The Viking III had a 450 hp (340 kW) Napier Lion IB, broader chord wings, and an additional square fin above the horizontal tail. The Viking III, as N147 carried out carrier compatibility trials on HMS Argus with the Royal Navy.

The Viking IV was the main production variant, and incorporated further refinements and had a wider cockpit above a hull that was about 1 foot wider, while the step was moved one foot aft in an attempt to fix porpoising problems. Most Mark IV Vikings had a Napier Lion engine, although the Rolls Royce Eagle (VIII & IX) were also used. There were significant differences between examples, including cockpit enclosures, different wing spans of either 46 ft (14 m) or 50 ft (15 m)), with the short wings inherited from the Mk.III being used on the models 54, 58, 60 and 67, different airfoil sections (RAF 15 and T64), with the T64 sections being used on the models 58, 60 and 67, and additional overwing fuel tanks that were used only on the model 64 for the USSR and 73 for Argentine airline use, while the models 54, 60, 64 and 73 omitted the seating position in the nose.

The next version was the Viking V, of which two were built for the RAF for service and trials in Iraq These, like the Japanese examples were fitted with a scarf ring in the nose.

A further development with a redesigned thicker and broader chord single-bay wing using the 450 hp (340 kW) Napier Lion would have been the Viking VI (Vickers designation Type 78) but was renamed the Vulture I. A second with a 360 hp (270 kW) Rolls-Royce Eagle IX was designated the Type 95 Vulture II. One of each model was built, however the Mk.II was later modified into a Mk.I.

The Viking VII (Vickers Type 83) was the final development of the Viking, with a new, more conventional tail, a new much wider hull with a pronounced chine to finally fix the porpoising problem, and after initial testing, it was given sweepback to the Vulture type broad chord single-bay wings to offset the weight of a gunner behind the engine. It was offered as a three-seat fleet spotter to Air Ministry specification 46/22 and given the service name Vanellus when evaluated by the RAF against the preferred Supermarine Seagull.

== Variants ==
31 Vikings were built, 25 by Vickers and 6 by Canadian Vickers, plus two Vultures and one Vanellus.

Viking I
one built, the series prototype, registered G-EAOV with an enclosed cockpit.
Viking II
one built, registered G-EASC.
Viking III
one built, registered G-EAUK and serialled N147 for Royal Navy carrier trials.
Viking IV
The first Vickers aircraft with a model number was the prototype Viking IV.

Model 54: Prototype IV, with an enclosed cockpit, sold to the French Navy, but registered as F-ADBL.
Model 55: Ten sold to Netherlands, including 2 replacement airframes.
Model 58: One sold to the UN Navy and two sold to Japan.
Model 60: Two built for long range flights including G-EBED and G-EBBZ
Model 64: Single aircraft sold to the USSR.
Model 67: One, G-EBED, modified for Sales demonstration flights in Spain.
Model 69: One sold to Laurentide Air Service in Canada and registered as G-CAEB.
Model 73: Two, one with an open cockpit and one with a closed cockpit sold for commercial use in Argentina. Both later sold to Argentine Navy
Model 84: Four sold to Argentine Navy.
Model 85: Two sold to the RCAF, followed by 6 built in Canada by Canadian Vickers.

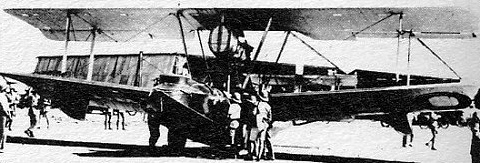
Vickers Vulture

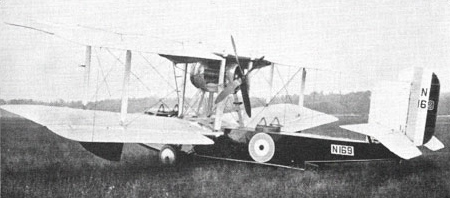
Vickers Vanellus

Viking V Model 59
Two built for Royal Air Force for use in Iraq as N156 and N157.

Viking VI (renamed Vulture)

Model 78: Vulture I, one built.
Model 88: Vulture II, one built.

Viking VII (renamed Vanellus)

Model 83: Vanellus I, one built.

== Operational history ==
Sir John Alcock died taking the prototype G-EAOV to the Paris exhibition on 18 December 1919, whilst trying to land at Côte d'Evrard, near Rouen, Normandy in fog.

The Viking III G-EAUK, piloted by Captain Stan Cockerell, won first prize in the amphibian class in Air Ministry competitions held in September and October, 1920.

The Japanese Vikings carried out carrier trials on the Japanese aircraft carrier Hōshō.

Ross Smith and J.M. Bennett (partners in the 1919 England to Australia flight) died on 13 April 1922 just outside the Brooklands racetrack near Weybridge in Surrey while flying Viking IV G-EBBZ after spinning into the ground.

A Viking IV, G-CAEB, was operated in Canada, after being delivered from Vickers to Laurentide Air Service. It was used for to deliver treaty payments to Indigenous tribes, for aerial mapping and later for prospecting minerals from Lac la Biche, and for fire spotting, and flew as far afield as Attawapiskat on James Bay in Ontario, to BC and from the Yukon to the Great Slave Lake. Some of its crew nicknamed it the "Bouncing Bronco", due to the Viking's known issue with porpoising (fore and aft pitching) on landing or takeoff.

In February 1923, the Canadian government made its first order for an airplane - 8 flying boats, to be built in Canada for photographic surveys to replace badly worn out Curtiss HS-2Ls that had been bought second hand, having originally been war surplus US Navy patrol seaplanes. These Vikings were delivered late in 1924, shortly after the formation of the Royal Canadian Air Force, who operated them. Canadian Vickers Limited, a subsidiary in Montreal with no prior aircraft experience, assembled two Viking IV amphibians sent as pattern aircraft (G-CYES and G-CYET) from the parent company in the UK, followed by six built in Montreal (G-CYEU, G-CYEV, G-CYEW, G-CYEX, G-CYEY and G-CYEZ).

While G-CAEB was being used to make hand-drawn maps by eye, these RCAF Vikings carried out photo survey flights, producing long strips of negatives that were used to produce much more accurate maps, including of the Reindeer Lake and Churchill River area of Northern Manitoba, which had not previously been mapped. In addition, they worked alongside the Ontario Provincial Air Service, carrying out forestry patrols, primarily in federally regulated regions of the country.

Both Vultures, G-EBHO and G-EBGO were used for an unsuccessful around the world attempt in 1924 after the Eagle engine of the Vulture II was replaced with a Lion. G-EBHO, set off from Calshot Seaplane Base on 25 March 1924, the other was shipped as a spare to Tokyo. After mechanical difficulties during earlier stages, G-EBHO crashed at Akyab where it was replaced by G-EBGO on 25 June. Encountering heavy fog on the Siberian side of the Bering Sea G-EBGO then crashed. Vickers salvaged a large proportion.

== Replicas ==
No Vikings survive today although a full-size replica built for the film The People That Time Forgot (1977) is displayed at Brooklands Museum in Surrey, England. A 7/8th scale flying replica built for the movie Map of the Human Heart is on display at the Alberta Aviation Museum, in Edmonton.

== Operators ==
Argentina

- Argentine Naval Aviation – four Type 84 (Viking IV) delivered in 1923, supplemented by two ex-civil Viking IVs in 1925.
- The River Plate Aviation Company (Compañia Rio Platense de Aviación) – Two Type 73 c/n 19 and c/n 20 (both Viking IVs) delivered in 1923. Sold to Argentine Navy in 1925.

Canada

- Laurentide Air Services – One Type 69 (Viking IV) delivered in 1922.
- Royal Canadian Air Force – two Type 85 (Viking IV) delivered in 1923 as kits, followed by six built in Canada by Canadian Vickers.

France

- French Navy – One Type 54 (Viking IV) delivered in 1921 with civilian markings.

Japan

- Imperial Japanese Navy – two Type 58 (Viking IV) delivered in 1921.

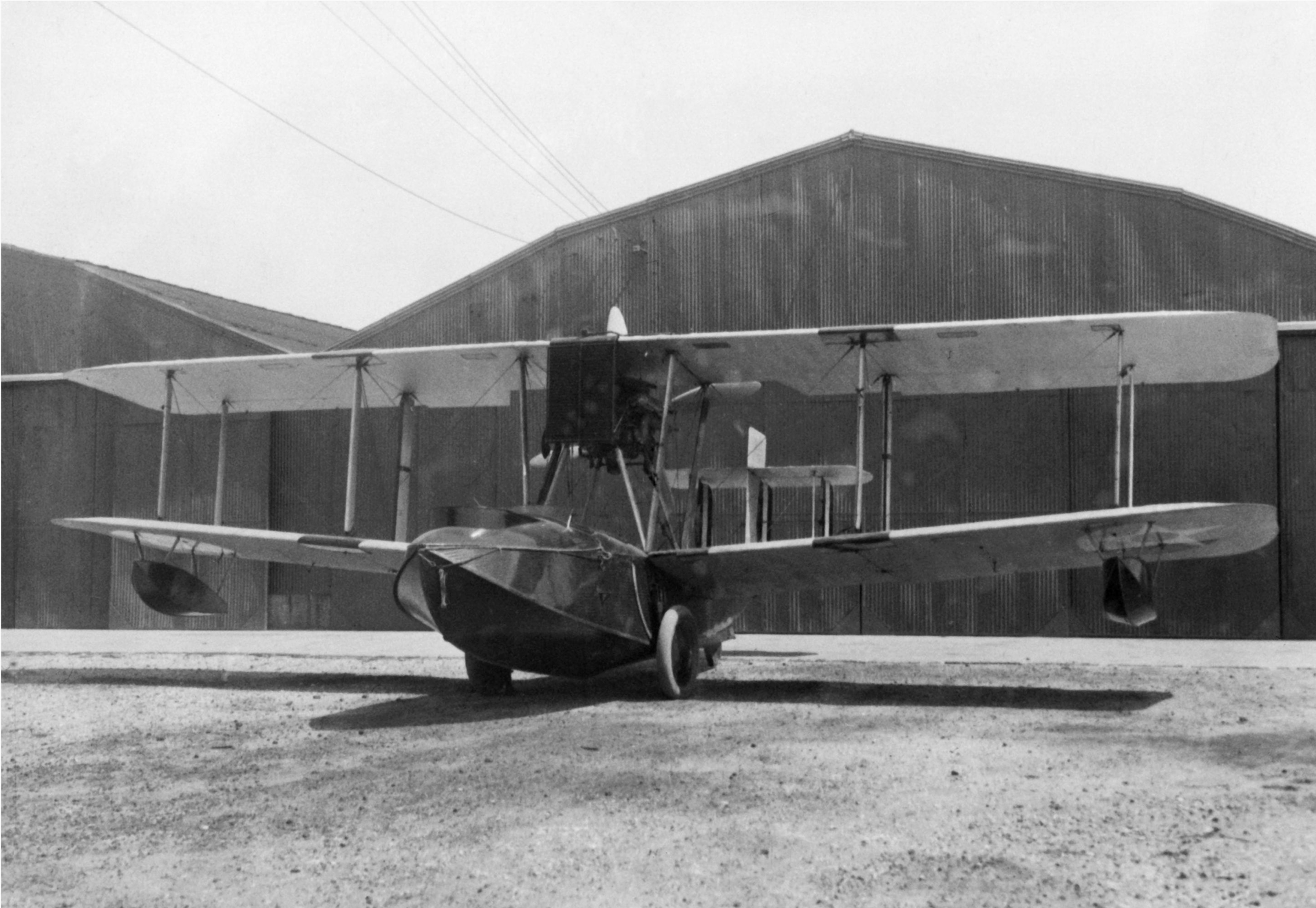
Vickers Viking IV at Langley

Netherlands

- Royal Netherlands East Indies Army Air Force – Eight Type 55 (Viking IV) delivered in 1922 followed two attrition replacements in 1923.

Russian SFSR

- One Type 64 (Viking IV) ordered by the Russian Trade Delegation delivered in 1922.

United Kingdom

- Royal Air Force – two Type 59 (Viking V) delivered in 1922 for tropical trials with No. 70 Squadron RAF.
- Royal Navy – one Viking III delivered in 1921, one Vanellus delivered 1925

United States

- United States Navy – one Type 58 (Viking IV) purchased by the US Navy in 1921 and delivered in 1923.

== Specifications (Viking IV) ==
Data from British Flying Boats

General characteristics

- Crew: 1
- Capacity: 3 passengers
- Length: 34 ft 2 in (10.41 m)
- Wingspan: 50 ft 0 in (15.24 m)
- Height: 14 ft 0 in (4.27 m)
- Wing area: 635 sq ft (59.0 m^{2})
- Airfoil: RAF-15 or T.64
- Empty weight: 4,040 lb (1,833 kg)
- Gross weight: 5,790 lb (2,626 kg)
- Powerplant: 1 × Napier Lion 12-cylinder water-cooled W type piston engine, 450 hp (340 kW)

Performance

- Maximum speed: 113 mph (182 km/h, 98 kn)
- Cruise speed: 91 mph (146 km/h, 79 kn)
- Range: 925 mi (1,489 km, 804 nmi) (with long range tanks)
- Endurance: 4 hr 45 min
- Time to altitude: 3.2 min to 3,000 ft (910 m)

== See also ==
- The Viking name was re-used by Vickers for the unrelated VC.1 Viking airliner some 22 years later.

Aircraft of comparable role, configuration, and era

- Aeromarine 50
- Boeing Model 204
- CAMS 37
- Curtiss Crane
- Curtiss HS
- FBA 21
- Ireland Neptune
- Supermarine Commercial Amphibian
- Supermarine Seagull
- Wackett Widgeon

Related lists

- Bush plane
- List of aircraft of the Royal Air Force
- List of flying boats and floatplanes
