= Karl Emil Tandberg =

Norwegian businessman

Karl Emil Tandberg (11 December 1873 – 1942) was a Norwegian businessperson.

He was born in Hole. He was the manager and owner of Oslo Baand- og Lidsefabrikk, a band and lace factory at Rodeløkka. He was member of the Federation of Norwegian Industries board as a representative of the domestic industry group, a board member of De Norske Bomuldsvarefabrikers Forening, Askim Gummivarefabrik, Den Norske Kalosje- og Gummivarefabrik, Den Norske Remfabrik, Hasle Brug, Grand Hotel and a supervisory council member of Hotel Bristol.
