= Duborgh Forsikring =

Norwegian insurance and finance company

Logo.

Duborgh Forsikring is a Norwegian insurance and finance company.

It was founded as Peter Thr. Duborgh on 1 October 1847, named after its founder Peter Therentie Duborgh. In addition to insurance, it was an agent firm for foreign brands such as Chaloupin and Louis Roederer. The company was also involved in export.

When Peter Therentie Duborgh died in 1892, the company was passed down to his sons Peter Carl Duborgh and William Duborgh; a third son Harald Duborgh was also a co-owner for some time. Peter Carl died in 1894 and William in 1929. William had brought Trygve Wettre on board as co-owner in 1908. Wettre was the sole owner until his death in 1936, when his brother Ragnar Wettre took over. He brought in Haakon Wettre (died 1938) and Ole Kr. Røed as co-owners; the latter brought in his son Egil Røed in 1940. When the father died in 1970, Egil Røed continued on his own. The company became a limited company in March 1990. It now specializes in life insurance, general insurance, money loans and savings. The headquarters are at Lysaker.
