= Trygve Wettre =

Trygve Wettre (13 January 1874 – 10 August 1936) was a Norwegian businessperson.

He was born in Kristiania as a son of Ole Wettre (1830–1898) and Christine Elisabet Johannesen (1833–1920). He was a younger brother of businessman Ragnar Wettre.

He attended Kristiania Borger- og Realskole, and at the school's hundredth anniversary in 1912 he and two brothers donated 1000 kr (more than 50,000 in modern currency) to the school. After finishing Kristiania Commerce School in 1890, Wettre worked office jobs in Norway until 1907, except for the period 1893 to 1899 when he stayed abroad. In 1908 he became a co-owner of the company Peter Thr. Duborgh. From 1929, when William Duborgh died, Wettre was the company's sole owner, and when he died, the company was passed on to Ragnar Wettre.

In 1916 he entered the first board of the Scandinavian American Assurance Corporation, together with L. S. Karlsen, Harald Hougen and B. Dreyer. He was the deputy chair of Kristiania Handelsstands Forening from 1916 to 1919, was a member of the 50-man committee of the Kristiania Chamber of Commerce and the Kristiania Stock Exchange arbitration court, and a board member of the Norwegian Branch of the International Law Association. He was a supervisory council member of Borregaard, De forenede Uldvarefabriker, Det Norske Luftfartrederi, the Schou Brewery, Den Norske Remfabrik, Lilleborg and De-No-Fa, and a board member of Norsk Aeroplanfabrik, Forsikringsselskapet Viking, Bergens Privatbank, Store Norske Spitsbergen Kulkompani and Vinmonopolet.

During prohibition in Norway (which was discontinued followed a 1926 referendum), Wettre was dispatched to conduct various negotiations with wine exporting countries: in Paris in 1923, Madrid in 1924 and Rome 1925. He was also decorated as a Chevalier of the Legion of Honour and Commander of the Order of the Crown of Italy. Wettre was however ousted from the board of Vinmonopolet after three seasoned wine importers, Carl, Sven and Roald Dysthe, unveiled and campaigned against nepotism between the board of directors and Mowinckel's Second Cabinet. Wettre and others ran a libel case against the Dysthe brothers, and was represented by barrister Per Strand Rygh, but lost the case.

Before his death in 1936 he was the vice chairman of the France-Norway Chamber of Commerce. He was buried at Vår Frelsers gravlund.
