= Supermarine Seagull (1921) =

1920s British flying boat

Seagull
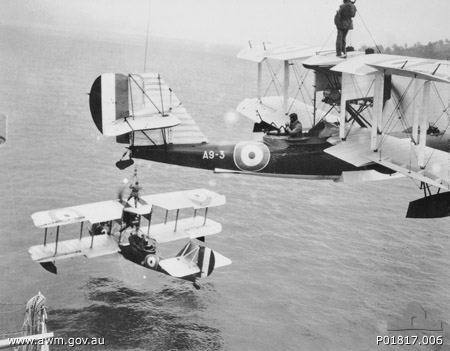
- Two Australian Seagull IIIs being hoisted aboard the carrier HMAS Albatross by the ship's cranes, 1926-1932.

General information
- Type: Reconnaissance flying boat
- Manufacturer: Supermarine
- Designer: R.J. Mitchell
- Primary users: Fleet Air Arm Royal Australian Air Force
- Number built: 34

History
- First flight: May 1921
- Developed from: Supermarine Seal II

The Supermarine Seagull was a flying boat produced by the British aircraft manufacturer Supermarine. It was developed by Supermarine's chief designer R.J. Mitchell from the experimental Supermarine Seal II.

Development of the Seagull started during 1920. In June 1921 it was evaluated for military applications but was rejected, and so Supermarine developed the aircraft as a private venture. During February 1922, an initial order for two aircraft was placed by the Air Ministry; subsequent production of the Seagull is believed to have assisted Supermarine to survive during a period when the aircraft industry struggled to attract customers.

The Seagull was used by the British Fleet Air Arm for gunnery spotting and reconnaissance duties. It was operated by the Royal Australian Air Force for similar purposes. During the early 1930s, when the type was being replaced by the more successful Supermarine Walrus, a number of Seagulls were re-used for civilian purposes.

== Background ==
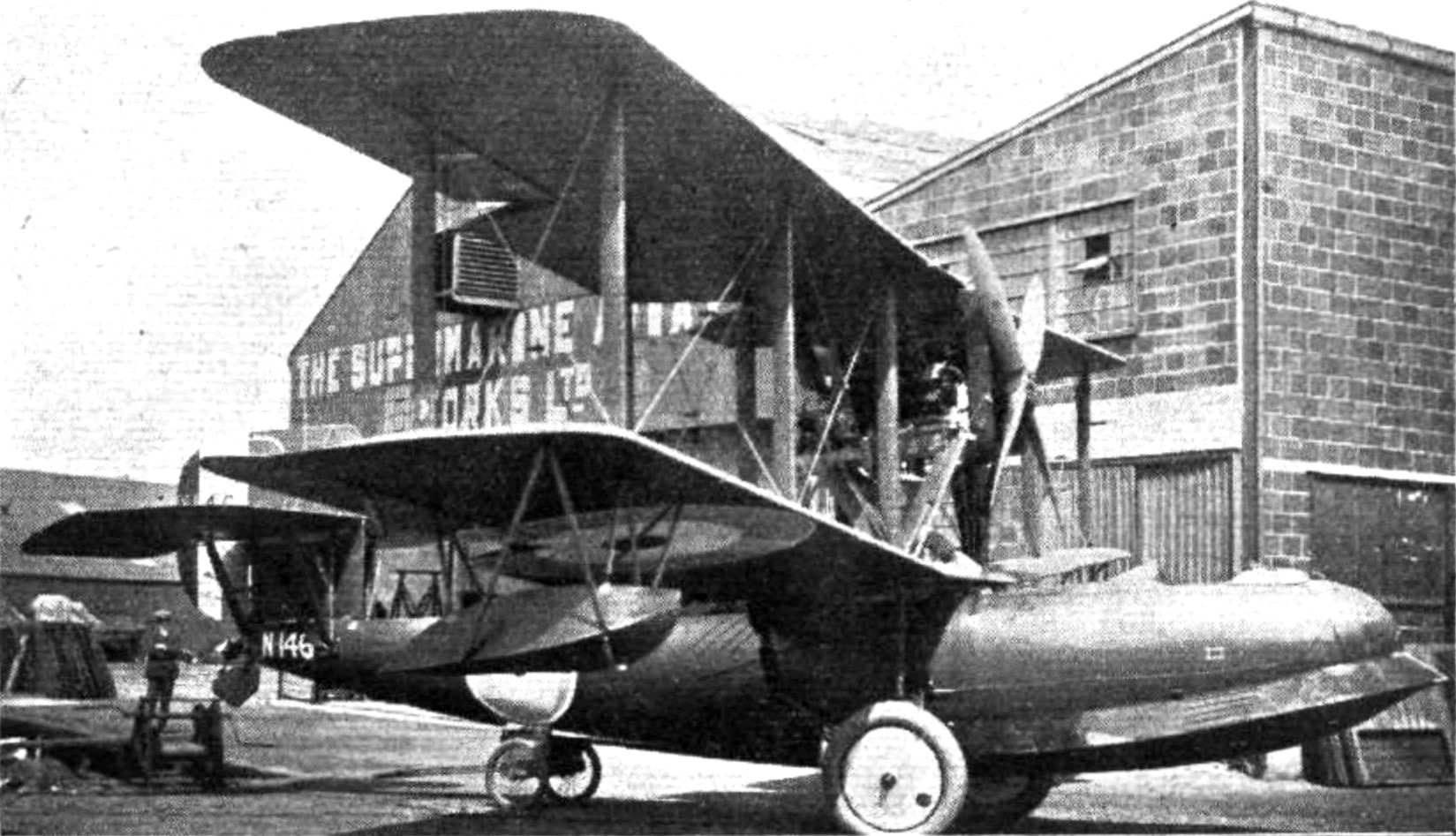
The Seagull I, registered as the Seal II N146

The origins of the Seagull are heavily interconnected with the Supermarine Seal and the Supermarine Commercial Amphibian. Work on the Seal, which started in 1920, sought to build upon the Commercial Amphibian. A range of alterations and improvements were incorporated, many of which were drawn from the Commercial's official review. The Commercial Amphibian was later designated as the Seal Mk I—and the new design, initially known as the Seal Mk II, later became the Seagull.

N158, the prototype of the Seagull, flew for the first time in May 1921. On 2 June 1921, having completed manufacturer's trials, it was handed over for service trials with the Royal Air Force. Attention was paid to the aircraft's seaworthiness and handling characteristics at low speeds, including its relatively low landing speed. Trials revealed that the rudder gave poor yaw characteristics. New designs were tested until a fin extension was found to solve the issues, which was incorporated into the prototype. Having been sufficiently impressed by the aircraft's performance, two aircraft were ordered by the Air Ministry in February 1922. The prototype was shown at the 1922 RAF Display at Hendon Aerodrome.

== Into production ==
On 4 July 1922, the name Seagull was adopted for the type. The prototype was designated as the Mk I; the subsequent production aircraft were given the designation Seagull Mk II. The two versions were similar, although an alternative powerplant in the form of a single more powerful Napier Lion III engine, a reduced wingspan, and a larger fin were used in the Mk II. Production of the Seagull (with serial numbers in and around N9642–N9647) began in 1922. In total, 25 aircraft were built for the Air Ministry and the Royal Navy; their production has been seen as critical to the survival of Supermarine at this time, and the first orders were intentionally built in small batches to ensure that the firm received enough business to stay operational.

In 1925, construction of the improved Mk III began for the Royal Australian Air Force (RAAF), following an order being placed in January of that year. This type featured a more powerful Napier Lion V engine, and the radiators were redesigned so as to be able to operate in tropical regions. The RAAF received six Mk IIIs between 1926 and 1927. In 1928, one of the Seagull Mk IIs (the so-called Mk IV) was rebuilt with Handley-Page leading edge slots and twin fins and rudders.

== Design ==
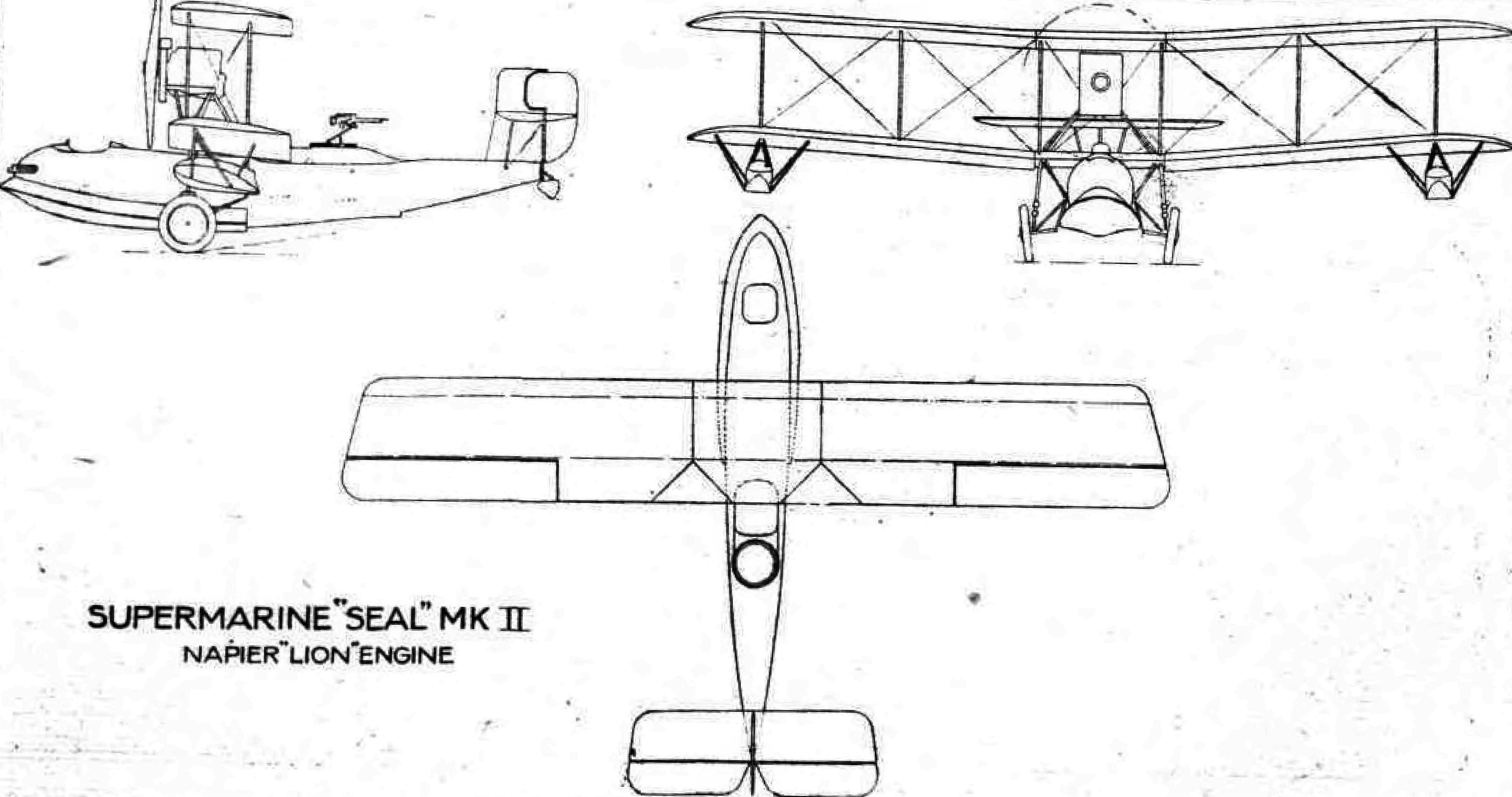
The general arrangement drawings of the Supermarine Seal Mk II, which was later renamed as the Seagull

The Supermarine Seagull was an amphibian flying boat, powered by a single Napier Lion engine. This engine was mounted in a nacelle slung from the aircraft's upper wing and powered a four-blade propeller in a tractor configuration. The Seagull employed gravity feed to supply fuel for the engine, and was the first single-engined flying boat to use this method.

The lower wing was set in the shoulder position and had two bays. The floats were attached to the lower wing near the wingtips via struts, their positioning maximised buoyancy. For land operations, the Seagull was equipped with a retractable undercarriage; pilots lacked aids such as indicators or alarms, thus were reliant on training and memory to deploy the undercarriage when applicable. For easier stowage on board ships, the wings were designed to be folded, which necessitated mounting the wings in a relatively forward position on the fuselage.

The fuselage had an oval cross-section and had a planing bottom with two steps. The interior of the fuselage was divided into several watertight compartments. The three-man crew—pilot, observer, and radio-operator—each had an open cockpit. The pilot was seated in a relatively forward position, at a distance from the other crew members, being directly ahead of the fuel tanks; the cockpit was provisioned with a single retractable machine gun. The radio operator was located just behind the wing, while the rear gunner position was further back still. The majority of the aircraft was constructed from wood. Previous Supermarine aircraft had incorporated the fuel tanks into the hull; with their removal to the upper wing, the Seagull's crew gained full access within the interior of the aircraft.

== Operational history ==
=== Mark II ===
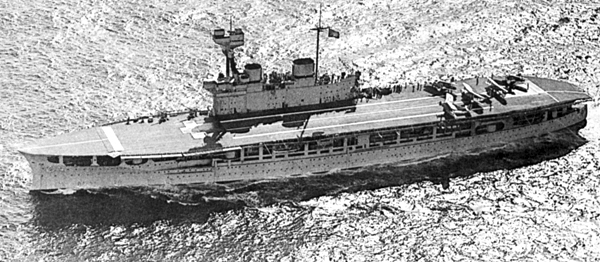
HMS Eagle

The Seagull II's assigned role in British service was that of a fleet spotter, being principally flown by No. 440 Flight, operating from HMS Eagle. During its service life, it determined to be most practically used for coastal reconnaissance missions. The aircraft was normally operated by a crew of three, while the sole armament installed was a .303 in (7.7 mm) Lewis gun. During its career the type proved to be unpopular with crews—creating a prejudice against similar aircraft that continued for a decade after the Seagull was superseded by the Fairey III. The length of runway required for takeoff was excessive, it handled poorly on the water, and was slow in comparison with land planes designed for a similar use.

Following an agreement made in 1922, a single Seagull Mk II was exported to Imperial Japan, intended to demonstrate and promote the capabilities of British aircraft and encourage further sales.

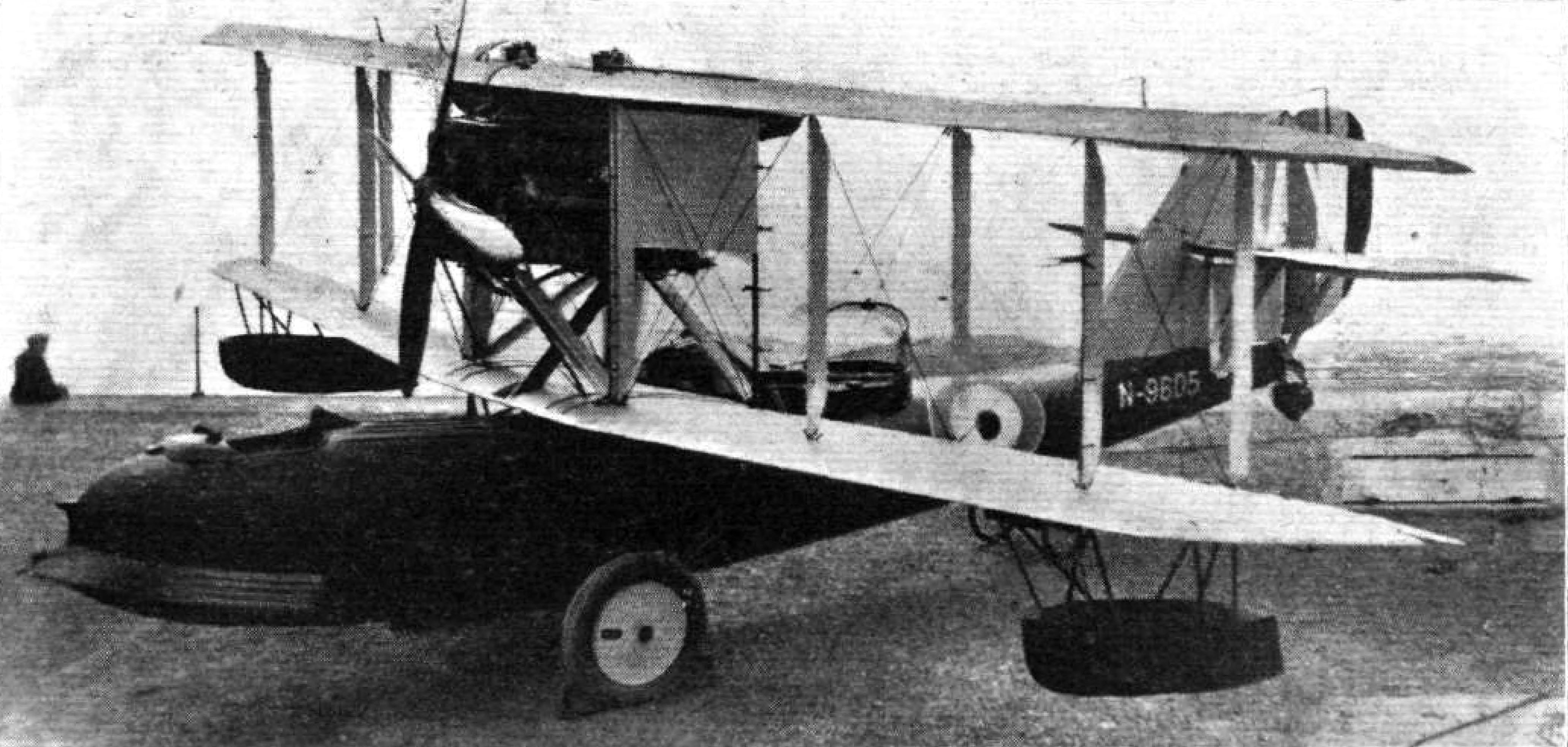
A Seagull entrant for the King's Cup Race in 1924

A pair of Seagulls were entered (with the Air Ministry's authorisation) for the 1924 King's Cup Race. During 1925, the Seagull Mk II was the first British aircraft to conduct a catapult launch; the type was used extensively to test various designs of catapult, harnessing both cordite charges and compressed air to power them, prior to their widespread introduction.

Three ex-military aircraft entered civilian use, being placed on the British Civil Register.

=== Mark III ===
External video
- Launch of Napier Supermarine Flying Boat (1926) from British Pathé

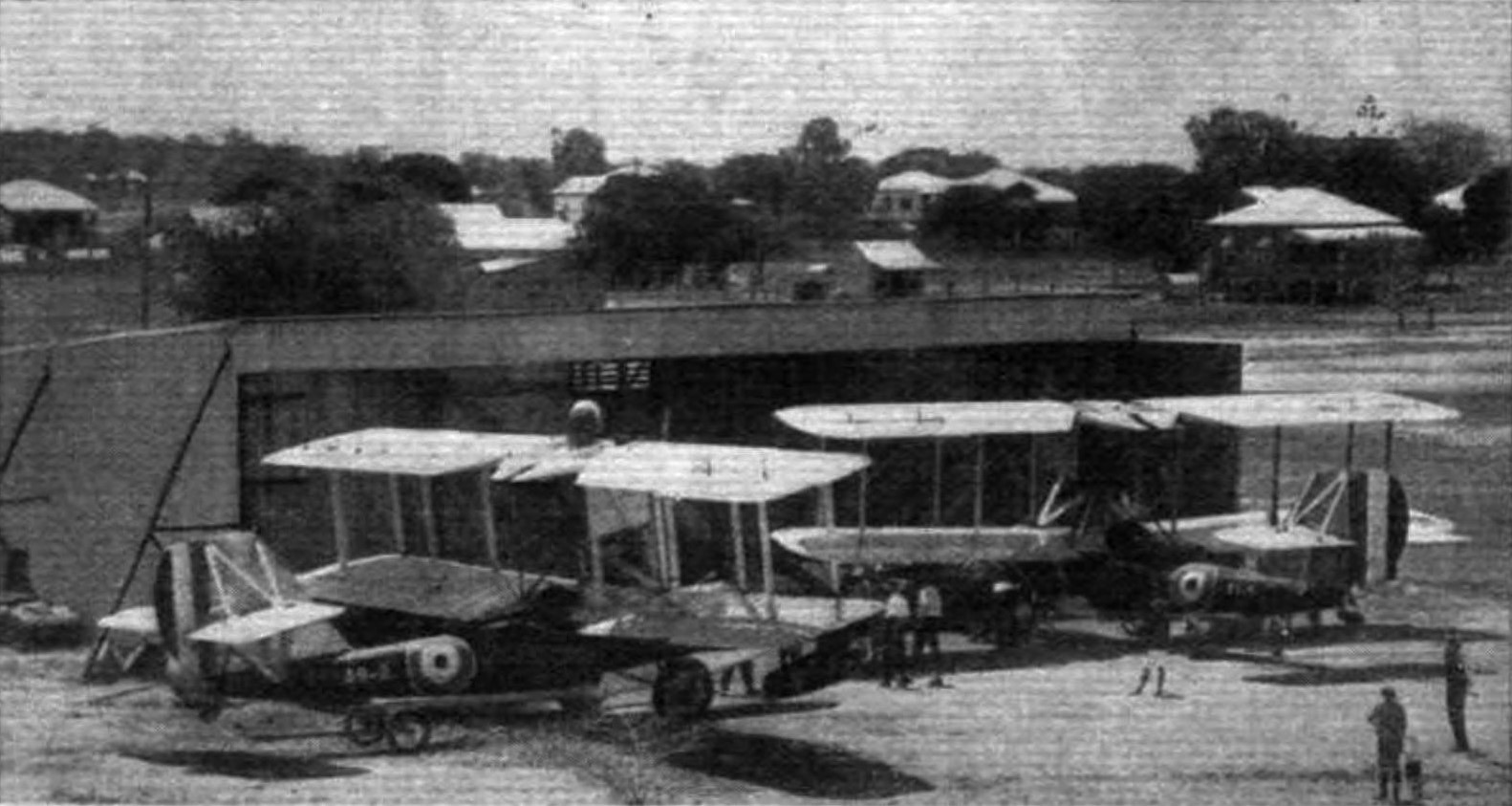
Supermarine Seagulls at Bowen, Queensland in 1928

In 1925, the UK Admiralty advised the Royal Australian Air Force (RAA) to acquire Seagulls to serve on the new seaplane carrier then being constructed, so enabling their ageing Fairey IIIDs to be retired. The first of six Seagulls for the Royal Australian Navy (RAN) arrived unassembled in April 1926 at RAAF Base Point Cook, near Melbourne. They were operated by the No. 101 Flight RAAF, which was formed in June 1926 and moved to its permanent base at RAAF Base Richmond in August 1926. They worked with HMAS Moresby during 1926 and 1927, assisting in the photographic survey of the Great Barrier Reef. Having aircraft based on board RAN ships avoided the need to build land facilities, so that even prior to the type's delivery, the RAN had decided to use seaplanes to perform photographic survey flights, covering areas from the Great Barrier Reef to the Persian Gulf. After January 1927, when three additional Seagulls were purchased from Supermarine, the surveys were extended to New Guinea.

From February 1929 to April 1933, six of the Seagulls served on board HMAS Albatross, Australia's first indigenously built warship, where they served as spotting, shadowing and reconnaissance aircraft. They were transferred to HMAS Canberra and HMAS Australia when Albatross became held in reserve in 1932. The Seagull IIIs were withdrawn from active service or scrapped in 1936; they were superseded by the Supermarine Seagull V. Two of the 9 aircraft, A9-6 and A9-8, were moved to technological institutes.

== Operators ==
Australia

- Royal Australian Air Force received 9 aircraft.
  - No. 101 Flight RAAF

Japan

- Imperial Japanese Navy Air Service received one aircraft.

United Kingdom

- Fleet Air Arm received 26 aircraft.

== Surviving aircraft ==
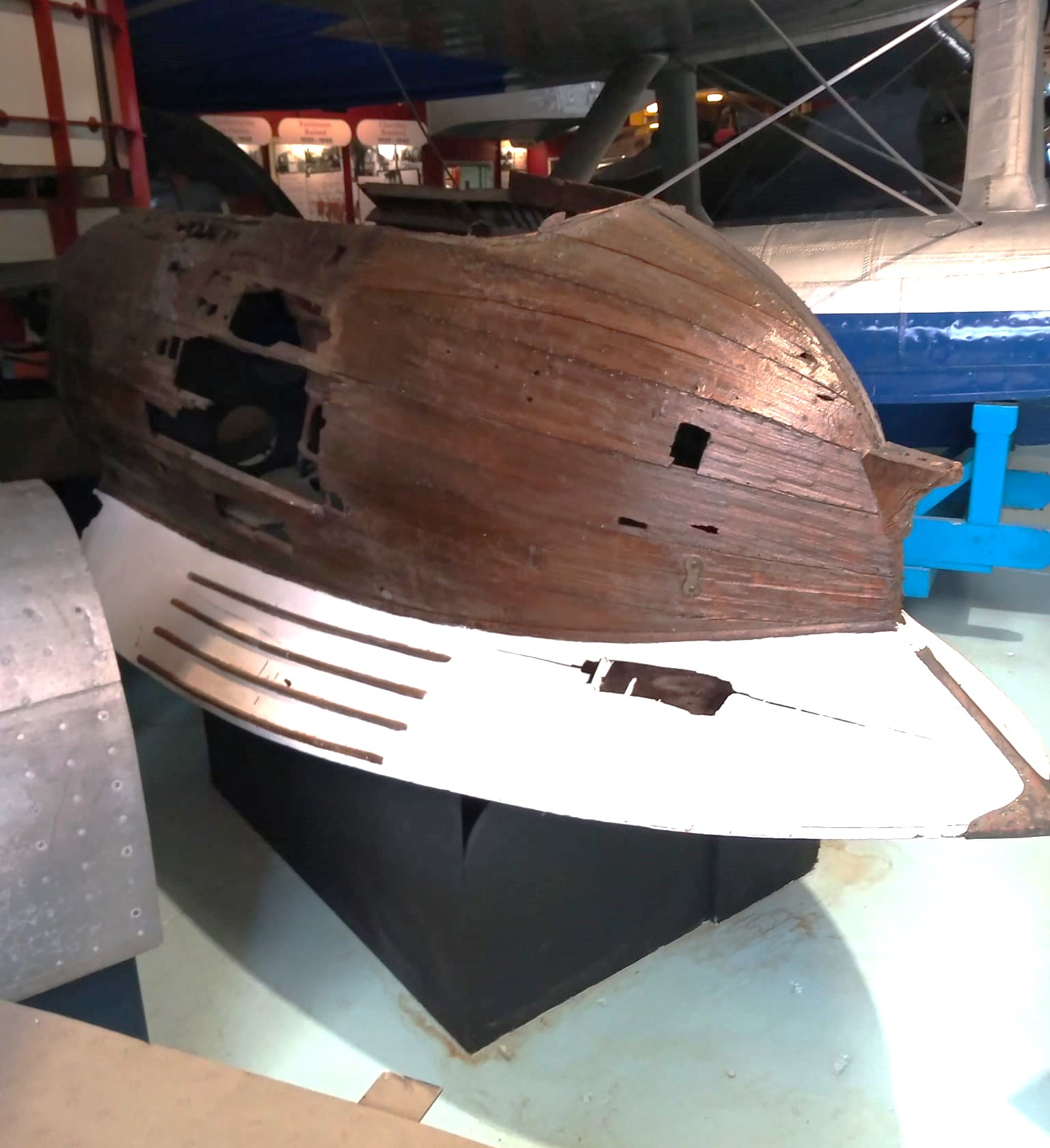
The nose cone of an unidentified Seagull on display at Solent Sky, Southampton

The Fleet Air Arm Museum owns the nose cone of an unknown Seagull. It was in use until 1974 as a garden shed, and presented to the museum in exchange for a new shed. It is currently on long-term loan to Solent Sky, an air museum in Southampton.

== Specifications ==
Data from Supermarine Aircraft since 1914

General characteristics

- Crew: 3 (pilot, wireless operator & observer)
- Length: 37 ft 9 in (11.51 m)
- Wingspan: 46 ft 0 in (14.02 m)
- Height: 14 ft 0 in (4.27 m)
- Wing area: 593 sq ft (55.1 m^{2})
- Empty weight: 3,820 lb (1,733 kg)
- Gross weight: 5,691 lb (2,581 kg)
- Powerplant: 1 × Napier Lion IIB W-12 water-cooled piston engine, 492 hp (367 kW)

Performance

- Maximum speed: 98 mph (158 km/h, 85 kn) at 3,000 ft (914 m)

92 mph (80 kn; 148 km/h) at 6,500 ft (1,981 m)

- Endurance: four hours, 30 minutes
- Service ceiling: 9,150 ft (2,790 m)
- Time to altitude: 3,000 ft (914 m) in7 minutes 43 seconds

Armament

- Guns: One × .303 in (7.7 mm) Lewis gun

== See also ==
Related development

- Supermarine Sheldrake
- Supermarine Walrus

Related lists

- Seaplanes and flying boats
- Aircraft of the: Japanese Navy · Fleet Air Arm · RNZAF and RNZN

== Sources ==
- Air Force History Branch (2021). Aircraft of The Royal Australian Air Force. New York: Big Sky Publishing. ISBN 978-19224-8-804-6.
- Andrews, C. F. & Morgan, Eric B. (1981). Supermarine Aircraft since 1914. London: Putnam. ISBN 978-0-370-10018-0.
- Brown, David (1971). Cain, Charles W. (ed.). Profile 224: Supermarine Walrus & Seagull Variants (PDF). Vol. 11. Windsor, UK: Profile Publications. OCLC 464172311.
- Shelton, John K. (2015). From Nighthawk to Spitfire: The Aircraft of R.J. Mitchell. History Press. ISBN 978-07509-6-550-7.
- Thetford, Owen (1994). British Naval Aircraft Since 1912. London: Putnam. ISBN 978-0-85177-861-7.
