= Supermarine Seal II =

1920s British flying boat

Seal II
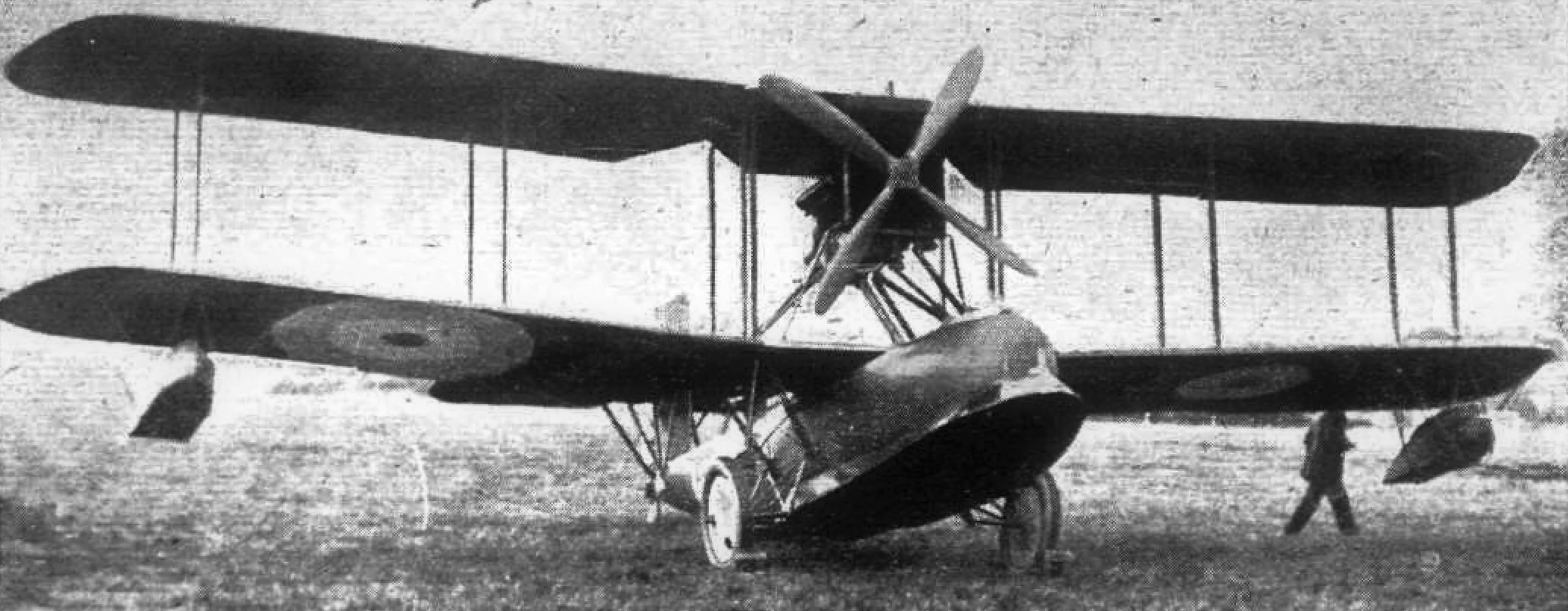

General information
- Type: Reconnaissance flying boat
- Manufacturer: Supermarine
- Designer: R.J. Mitchell
- Number built: 1

History
- First flight: May 1921
- Variants: Supermarine Seagull; Fleet Spotting Gunnery Amphibian

The Supermarine Seal II was a British flying boat developed by Supermarine after it secured a British Air Ministry order for a prototype three-seater fleet spotter amphibian. The prototype, which had to be capable of landing on Royal Air Force (RAF) aircraft carriers, was designed by Supermarine's R.J. Mitchell, who incorporated suggestions made after the Supermarine Commercial Amphibian achieved second place after it was entered for an Air Ministry competition in 1920.

The Seal II was a biplane with the lower wing mounted on top of the fuselage. Powered by a 450 horsepower (340 kW) Napier Lion water-cooled piston engine, it was the first British flying boat with the propeller positioned in front of the engine. The pilot was seated forward in the nose with the fuel tanks placed behind him, and a second cockpit was located behind the wing.

The Seal II first flew on 21 May 1921 prior to being assessed by the RAF. After being modified and fitted with a different engine, it was renamed the Seagull prior to being delivered to the RAF two months later. In November 1921 the Seal II was one of a number of aircraft sold to the Imperial Japanese Navy Air Service and shipped out with the British-led Sempill Mission to Kasuimiguara.

== Background ==
The flying boats built by Supermarine at their works at Woolston, Southampton, had a reputation for being seaworthy and solidly constructed. They were considered by Flight magazine to be "always of substantial construction, a proper boat-built job, a boat that will fly rather than an aeroplane that will float".

Flying boat designs produced by Supermarine's R.J. Mitchell, later to become the chief designer at Supermarine, and shown to the British Air Ministry, together with the good performance of the Supermarine Commercial Amphibian, resulted in Supermarine winning an order for a prototype three-seater fleet spotter amphibian. The Air Ministry produced specification 7/20 around the prototype aircraft, a biplane that was specified to be capable of landing on Royal Air Force (RAF) aircraft carriers as slowly as possible, with the maximum amount of control.

== Design ==
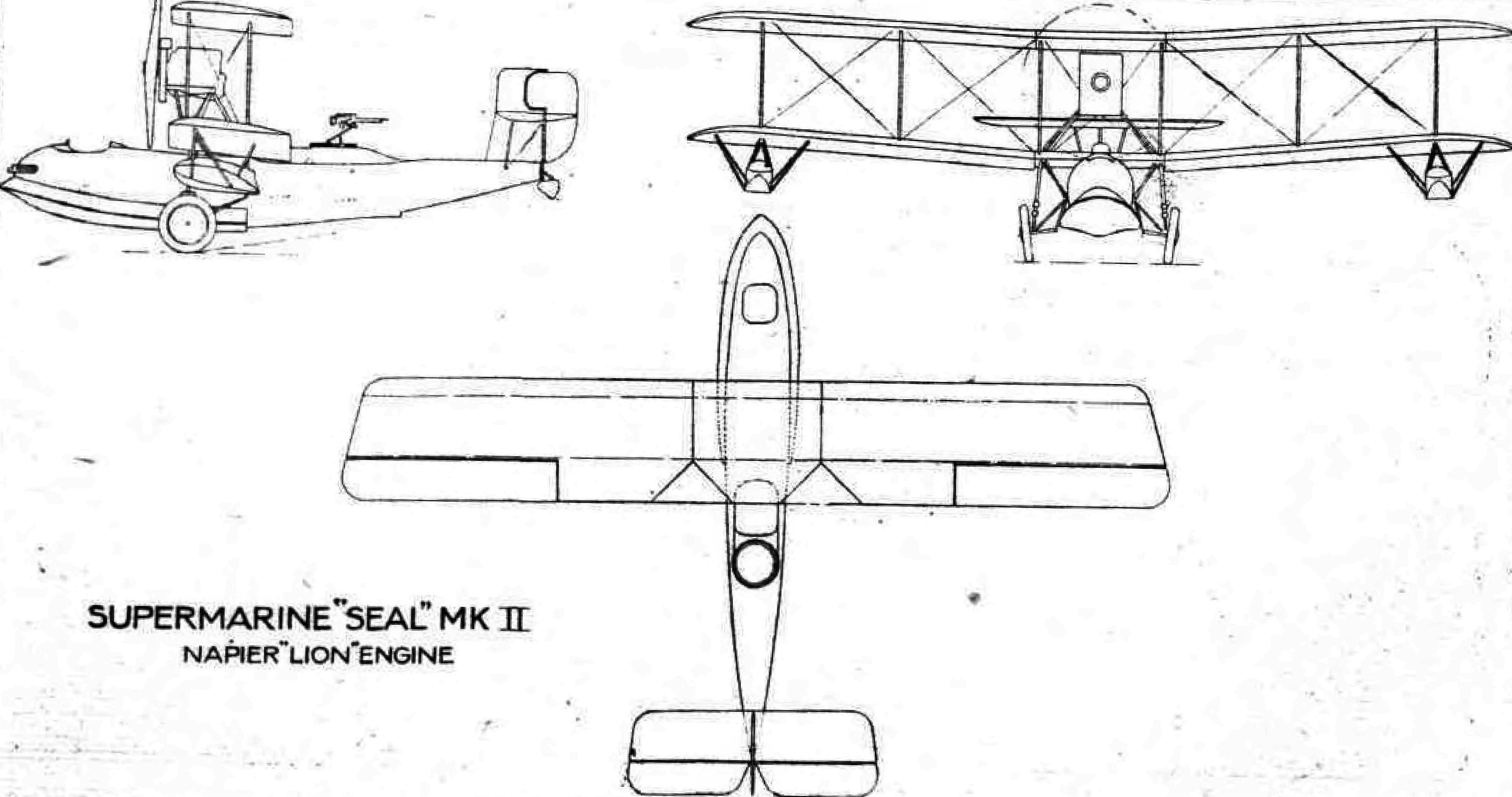
Supermarine Seal II general arrangement drawings

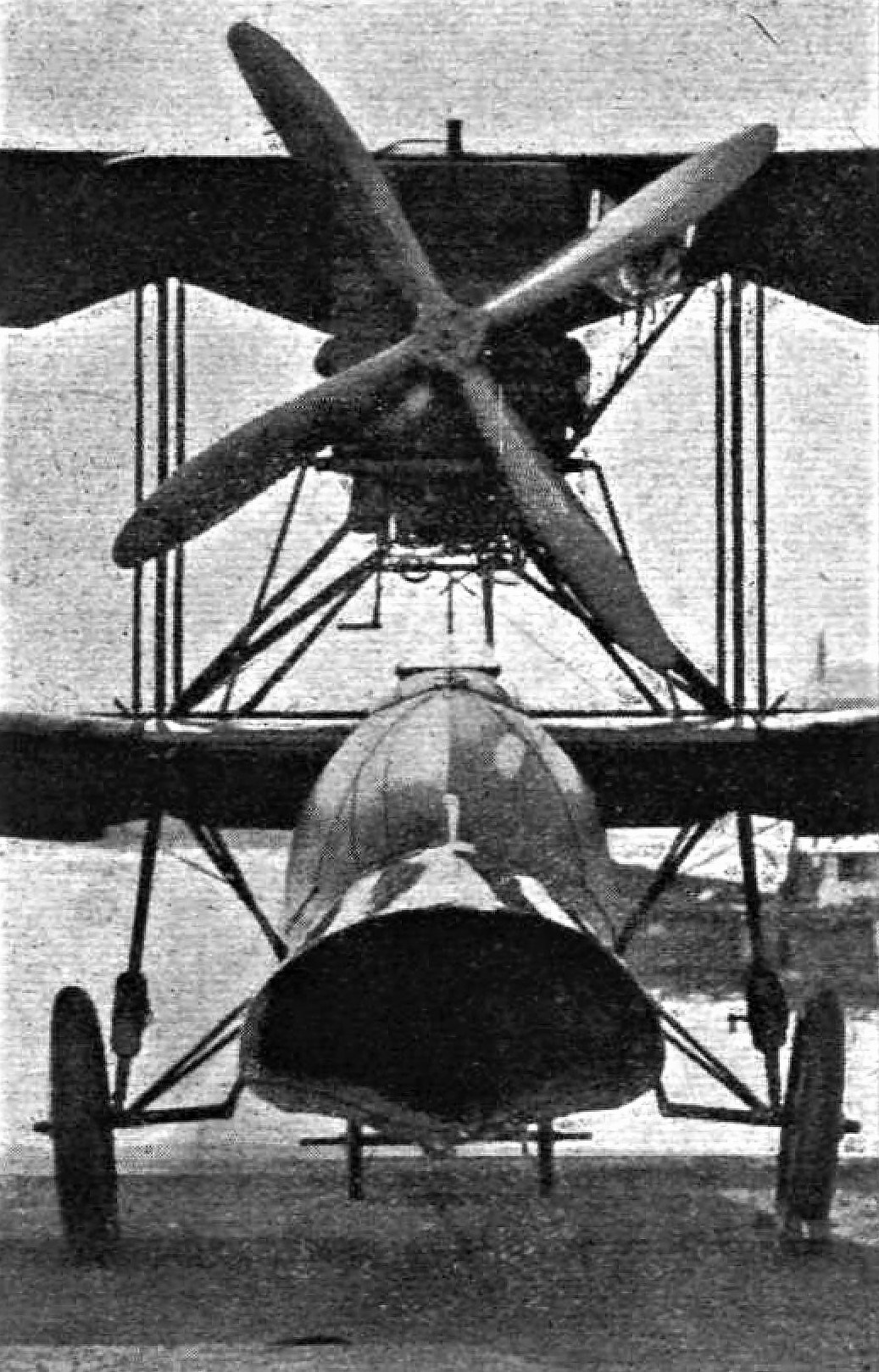
Supermarine Seal II (front view)

Hubert Scott-Paine, who owned Supermarine, named the aircraft Seal II. Historians have presumed that this happened because the Commercial Amphibian was briefly designated by Scott-Paine as the Seal I.

Supermarine incorporated suggestions made by the Air Ministry after the company's Commercial Amphibian entered a seaplane competition at Martlesham Heath and Felixstowe in September 1920. Mitchell produced the first drawings for the Seal II, which date from 25 November 1920.

The Seal II was a two-bay biplane with the lower wing mounted on top of the fuselage and the 450 horsepower (340 kW) Napier Lion water-cooled piston engine mounted below the centre-section of the upper wing. It was the first British flying boat propelled with a tractor configuration (with its engine mounted with the propeller in front so that the aircraft is "pulled" through the air). The wings were rearward folding. The fuselage, of a type designed by Linton Hope during the First World War, was roughly circular in cross-section and was built of planking over a framework of formers and stringers covered with fabric, with the planing surfaces built as separate structures, divided into watertight compartments.

The second cockpit of the Seal was located behind the wing, and the undercarriage retractor system was of a new design so that the need for cables was avoided. The pilot, who was protected in his cockpit by a cover, was seated forward in the nose with the fuel tanks placed behind him and in front of the other crew members.

== Operational history ==
The Seal II prototype was allocated the serial N146, and first flew on 21 May 1921. It was officially handed over to the RAF on 2 June 1921, who flew the aircraft to the Isle of Grain to be assessed. Following the trials, which were generally satisfactory, the RAF recommended a number of modifications to be made that included moving the position of the fuel tanks from inside the hull to the upper wing, and increasing the size of the rudder and the fin. The aircraft was re-engined with a 480 horsepower (360 kW) Napier Lion II power unit.

Mitchell made further modifications to the Seal II after two prototypes (of specification 21/21) were ordered by the Air Ministry at the beginning of 1922. He lengthened the hull by 2 feet (0.61 m), modified the tail surfaces, and amended the shape of the wings to correct the aircraft's balance. The prototypes were designated N185 and N159, and renamed as Seagulls on 4 July 1921 prior to being delivered to the RAF. A Seagull was exhibited at the annual RAF Aerial Pageant at Hendon in June 1922. A variant of the Seal, the Fleet Spotting Gunnery Amphibian, was designed by Mitchell, but not built.

Both a Seal II and a Seagull were sold to the Imperial Japanese Navy Air Service when it acquired aircraft after a fact-finding mission in Britain. The aircraft were shipped out with the British-led Sempill Mission, arriving in Kasuimiguara, 40 miles (64 km) north-east of Tokyo, in November 1921. It was acquired "with a view to experimenting with it under actual service conditions".

== Specifications (Seal II) ==
Data from Supermarine Aircraft since 1914

General characteristics

- Crew: 3
- Length: 32 ft 10 in (10.01 m)
- Wingspan: 46 ft 0 in (14.02 m)
- Height: 14 ft 10 in (4.52 m)
- Wing area: 620 sq ft (58 m^{2})
- Empty weight: 4,100 lb (1,860 kg)
- Gross weight: 5,600 lb (2,540 kg)
- Powerplant: 1 × Napier Lion W-12 water-cooled piston engine, 450 hp (340 kW)
- Propellers: 4-bladed wooden fixed-pitch pusher propeller

Performance

- Maximum speed: 112 mph (180 km/h, 97 kn)
- Endurance: 4 hours
- Time to altitude: 10,000 ft (3,048 m) in 17 minutes

== See also ==
Related development

- Supermarine Seagull

Related lists

- Seaplanes and flying boats

== Sources ==
- Andrews, Charles Ferdinand; Morgan, Eric B. (1981). Supermarine Aircraft since 1914. London: Putnam. ISBN 978-03701-0-018-0.
- Peattie, Mark R (2007). Sunburst: The Rise of Japanese Naval Air Power, 1909-1941. Annapolis, Maryland: Naval Institute Press. ISBN 978-1-61251-436-9.
- Pegram, Ralph (2016). Beyond the Spitfire: The Unseen Designs of R.J. Mitchell. Pegram: The History Press. ISBN 978-0-7509-6515-6.
- Thetford, Owen (1994). British Naval Aircraft Since 1912. London: Putnam. ISBN 978-0-85177-861-7.
