= Supermarine Commercial Amphibian =

1920s British flying boat

Commercial Amphibian
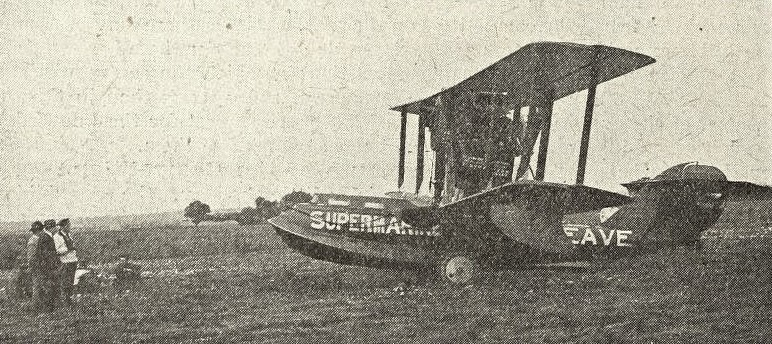

General information
- Type: Passenger flying boat
- Manufacturer: Supermarine
- Designer: R.J. Mitchell
- Status: destroyed
- Number built: 1

History
- First flight: September 1920
- Retired: 1920
- Developed from: Supermarine Channel
- Developed into: Supermarine Seal II

The Supermarine Commercial Amphibian (originally named the Supermarine Amphibian, later designated N147 by the British Air Ministry) was a passenger-carrying flying boat. The first aircraft to be designed by Supermarine's Reginald Mitchell, it was built at the company's works at Woolston, Southampton, for an Air Ministry competition that took place during September 1920. Based on the Supermarine Channel, the Amphibian was a biplane flying boat with a single engine, a wooden hull, unequal wingspans and a 350 horsepower (260 kW) Rolls-Royce Eagle engine. The pilot sat in an open cockpit behind two passengers.

The Commercial Amphibian finished second in the competition, but was judged the best of the three entrants in terms of design and reliability, and as a result the prize money of £4,000 (equivalent to £193,010 in 2023) was doubled. In October 1920 it crashed and was damaged beyond repair, and no more Commercial Amphibians were built, but on the strength of the performance of the aircraft during the competition, Supermarine was commissioned to make a prototype three-seater Fleet Spotter Amphibian, later named the Supermarine Seal II.

== Background ==
In April 1920, the British Air Ministry announced that it would hold two competitions for commercial aircraft, one for land planes and one for seaplanes. The Ministry's aim was to attempt to stimulate Britain's aircraft industry, which had struggled since the end of World War I. The Supermarine Commercial Amphibian—originally known as the Supermarine Amphibian—was designed by Supermarine's chief designer Reginald Mitchell to compete for the seaplane prize, and was his first aircraft design. The Air Ministry's requirements for the entrants included the need to accommodate at least two passengers that could board the aircraft on land or on the water. Both the passengers and the crew had to have access to lifebelts. The aircraft had to be able to fly 350 nautical miles (650 km; 400 mi) at 300 metres (980 ft) at a speed of at least 70 knots (130 km/h; 81 mph), whilst carrying a minimum load of 230 kilograms (510 lb). The aircraft also had to show that it could fly for three minutes at 914 metres (3,000 ft), and land over tethered balloons positioned 7.6 metres (25 ft) above the ground.

== Design ==
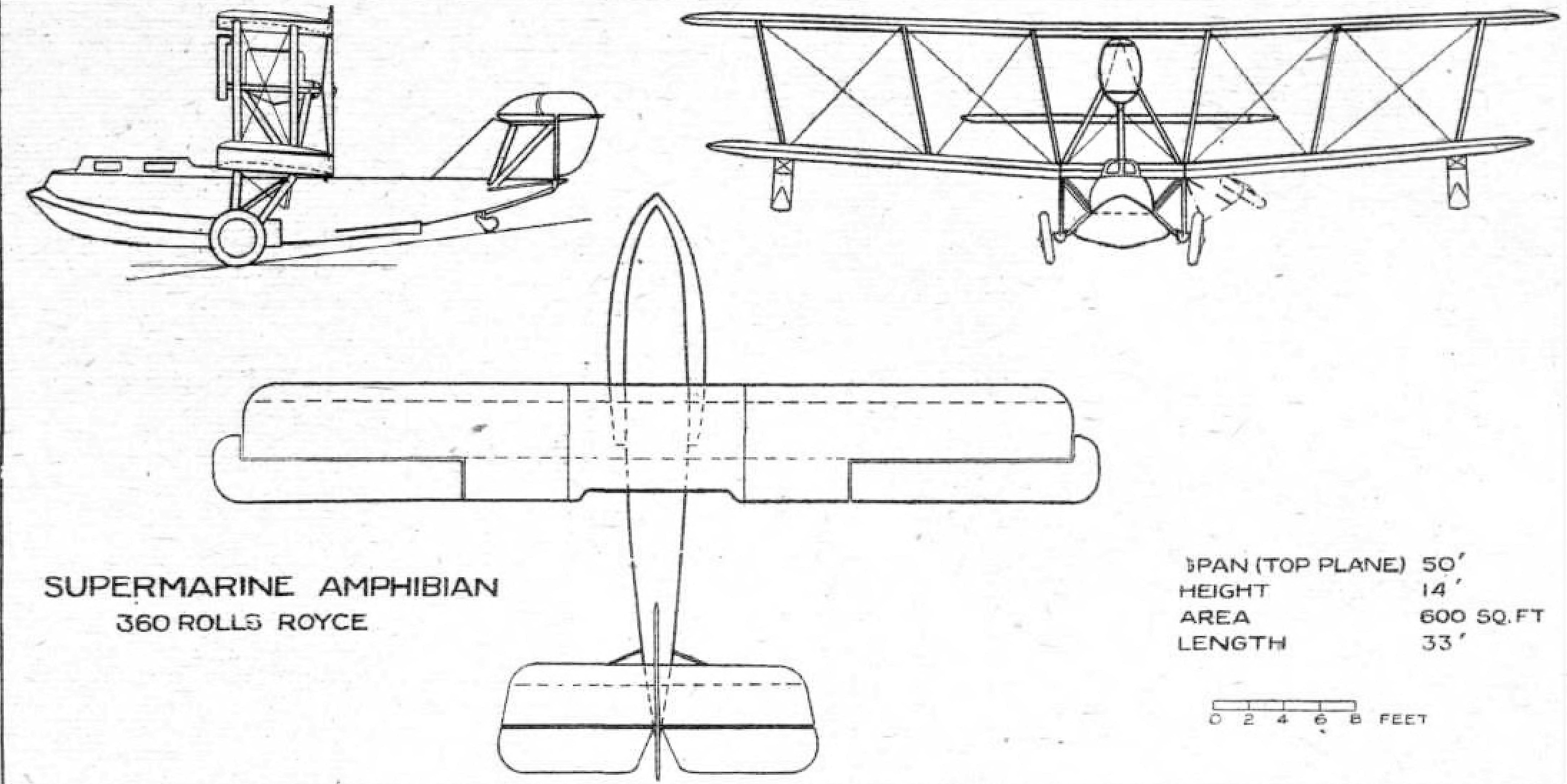
General arrangement drawings for the Supermarine Commercial Amphibian (Flight, September 1920)

Mitchell based his design for the Amphibian on Supermarine's Channel flying boat, itself a modified version of the AD Flying Boat. A reconnaissance and patrol aeroplane that was produced at the end of World War I, the AD Flying Boat never saw action during the war.

The Amphibian was a single-engined biplane flying boat with a wooden hull and unequal wingspans. The 350 horsepower (260 kW) Rolls-Royce Eagle engine was mounted between the wings in a pusher configuration (with the propeller mounted behind the engine). The tail had a single vertical fin, and single tailplane mounted halfway up the fin. The front of the aircraft was designed to make sure that it lifted clear of the water prior to take-off, and the nose profile was similar to that of a boat. An innovation introduced by Mitchell was a mechanism to operate the ailerons simultaneously. The undercarriage was designed to be partially retractable.

The Amphibian's pilot was accommodated in an open cockpit just forward of the wings, with space for two passengers in an enclosed cabin further forward. There was a tiller for the pilot to use when the aircraft was on the water, so that it could more easily be navigated through narrow waters.

== Operational history ==
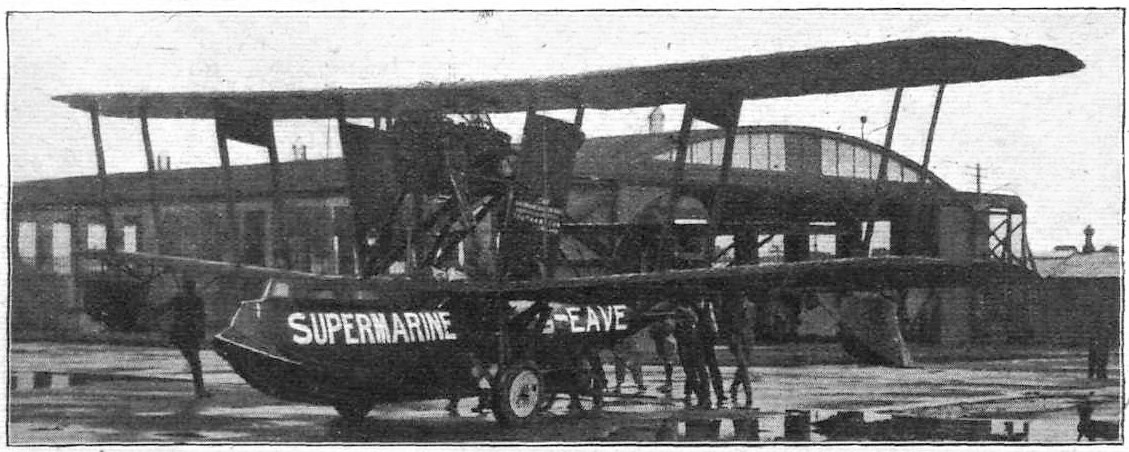
The Amphibian being wheeled out prior to testing during the Air Ministry competition (Flight, September 1920)

The Air Ministry competition was held during September 1920 at the experimental Royal Air Force stations at Martlesham Heath and Felixstowe. The Supermarine Amphibian (given the registration G-EAVE) was piloted by Herbert Hoare. it competed against two other seaplanes, a Vickers Viking, and a Fairey III. Two other seaplanes failed to arrive for the competition.

Because of its larger weight and slower speed in comparison with its two competitors, the Supermarine Amphibian performed poorly in the air, but it was judged to be the competition's best constructed and most reliable aircraft. It was the only entrant to complete all the tests, and throughout the competition there was never any need to adjust the aircraft. The competition was won by the Vickers Viking, which gained the winner's prize of £10,000 (equivalent to £482,530 in 2023), and the Amphibian came second. The Amphibian's consolation prize of £4,000 was doubled to £8,000 (equivalent to £386,020 in 2023) by the Air Ministry, which judged Mitchell's design to be excellent and the aircraft to have performed well, considering that it had the lowest powered engine of the three competitors.

The Commercial Amphibian crashed a month after the competition, when on 13 October 1920, after departing from Southampton, it was involved in an accident at Great Bookham, Surrey. It was damaged beyond repair, and no other Amphibians were produced.

== Legacy ==
After the competition, the Air Ministry designated the Vickers Viking as N146, and the Supermarine Amphibian as N147. On the strength of the Amphibian's performance, the Air Ministry commissioned Supermarine to make a prototype three-seater Fleet Spotter Amphibian. The ministry produced specification 7/20 for the prototype, named the Supermarine Seal II, and drawings were completed by Supermarine in November 1920. Features seen in the Amphibian were later used to develop the Supermarine Walrus, hundreds of which were built and were in operational service throughout the World War II. Mitchell also used ideas both from the Amphibian and the Supermarine Channel II to design an Amphibian Flying Boat for Ship Work in 1920.

== Specifications ==
Data from Supermarine Aircraft since 1914.

General characteristics

- Crew: 1
- Capacity: 2 passengers
- Length: 32 ft 6 in (9.91 m)
- Upper wingspan: 50 ft (15 m)
- Lower wingspan: 47 ft (14 m)
- Height: 14 ft 6 in (4.42 m)
- Wing area: 600 sq ft (56 m^{2})
- Empty weight: 3,996 lb (1,813 kg)
- Gross weight: 5,700 lb (2,585 kg)
- Powerplant: 1 × Rolls-Royce Eagle VIII V-12 water-cooled piston engine, 350 hp (260 kW)
- Propellers: 4-bladed wooden fixed-pitch propeller

Performance

- Maximum speed: 94 mph (151 km/h, 82 kn)
- Cruise speed: 80 mph (130 km/h, 70 kn)
- Alighting speed: 55 mph (48 kn; 89 km/h)
- Range: 312 mi (502 km, 271 nmi)

== See also ==
Aircraft of comparable role, configuration, and era

- Saunders Kittiwake

Related lists

- List of flying boats and floatplanes

== Sources ==
- Andrews, Charles Ferdinand; Morgan, Eric B. (1981). Supermarine Aircraft since 1914. London: Putnam. ISBN 978-0-370-10018-0.
- Jackson, Aubrey Joseph (1973). British Civil Aircraft Since 1919. London: Putnam. ISBN 978-08517-7-813-6.
- Pegram, Ralph (2016). Beyond the Spitfire: The Unseen Designs of R.J. Mitchell. Pegram: The History Press. ISBN 978-0-7509-6515-6.
