= Roald Dysthe =

Norwegian businessman (1903–1997)

Roald Rachlew Dysthe (16 April 1903–28 December 1997) was a Norwegian businessperson and acquitted Nazi collaborator.

== Pre-war life and career ==
He was born in Kristiania as a son of alcohol importer Carl Schøyen Dysthe and Alfhild Dorothea Rachlew Dysthe. He had one older brother, Sven, and the younger siblings Gunnar, Ingeborg and Helge. He finished his secondary education in 1921, and took his education abroad, in commerce, wine and liquor production. He started a business career together with his brother Sven.

From 1928 to 1930 they were involved in a major public case. On 4 May 1928 they wrote a letter to the government, complaining that the state semi-monopoly Vinmonopolet disfavorized their father's wine importing agency Dysthe & Co. A scrutiny commission was set up to review Vinmonopolet's business practice. Vinmonopolet, on the other hand, sued the Dysthe brothers to have the complaints declared null and void, but a year later, in April 1930, Vinmonopolet lost the legal case. The Dysthe brothers' defender was Ole Røed. The case became a major scandal in the media as Vinmonopolet's role was unveiled. The board chairman Hans Halvorsen, who was a brother-in-law of the Prime Minister Johan Ludwig Mowinckel, had to resign together with board member Trygve Wettre and three employees.

From the 1930s the brothers were active in the Norwegian-Third Reich friendship society Norsk-Tysk Selskap. He worked at McKesson & Robbins. and was a board member of Dysthe & Co.

== World War II ==
After Nazi Germany invaded Norway on 9 April 1940, and Vidkun Quisling's party Nasjonal Samling (NS) became the only legal party, Dysthe sided with the German occupiers. He intrigued in order to weaken NS, and had contacts in the Reichskommissariat Norwegen. At the same time he was a member of NS, although he claimed the reason for his membership was to inform the Germans about party affairs. Among others, he contributed to the downfall of Wilhelm Frimann Koren Christie as president of the Norwegian Broadcasting Corporation (NRK). Christie was a Norwegian nationalist and Quisling supporter, and as Dysthe was a special supervisor in the NRK from September 1941 he reported Christie to the Reichskommissariat, who fired him. NRK had earlier been scrutinized by police inspector Gard Holtskog; however he advised to keep Christie and to limit the German influence.

From 28 September 1940 Dysthe was also the chief executive of the company Nordisk Radio-Press. He also owned one share of stock. The Norwegian News Agency also had one share, but Nordisk Radio-Press took over the News Agency's task of delivering news to the Norwegian Broadcasting Corporation. Historian Hans Fredrik Dahl has referred to Dysthe's company as a "pure parasite". It bought news from the Norwegian News Agency, and sold this expensively to the Norwegian Broadcasting Corporation without changing it. Members of the company's supervisory council were paid refunds for meetings that were never held. Dysthe was also behind the merger of the broadcast programming magazines Hallo-Hallo! and Radiobladet into Norsk Programblad in 1940. Nordisk Radio-Press was the publisher of Norsk Programblad, but it went bankrupt in 1941 when the authorities confiscated all radios (except for those belonging to Nasjonal Samling members).

Dysthe had a personal campaign against cabinet member Albert Viljam Hagelin. In 1944 Dysthe intrigued and advised the Reichskommissariat to depose Quisling and his cabinet. For this Dysthe was excluded from Nasjonal Samling, and imprisoned. He was incarcerated in Bredtveit concentration camp from November 1944, then in Berg concentration camp from January 1945.

== Post-war life ==
After the war, when the Nazis were ousted and the legal purge in Norway after World War II took place, Dysthe was released from prison but subsequently convicted for treason in September 1946. He was sentenced to six years of forced labour, 320,000 kr payable in compensation and the loss of his civil rights. He was later acquitted for treason in 1950, and moved to Canada in 1951. This was not uncontroversial as he probably contributed to the saving of many Norwegian lives, both by persuading German forces to enforce milder penalties, but also by leaking information. He received compensation from the Parliament of Norway in 1984. In 1993 the newspaper Verdens Gang called him a "war hero". Around that time he was still living, in Montreal, Quebec, Canada.
