= William Duborgh =

Norwegian businessman

William Adolf Duborgh (14 November 1860 – 1929) was a Norwegian businessperson.

He was born in Kristiania as a son of Peter Therentie Duborgh and Caroline Joseline Mervis. His sister Ragnhild married Ingvald Mareno Smith-Kielland. In 1886, he married Louise Fredrikke Krohn, a daughter of actor Georg Herman Krohn.

He finished Kristiania Commerce School in 1878. In 1892 he took over his father's company Peter Thr. Duborgh together with his brother Peter Carl Duborgh. Peter Carl died in 1894, and William Duborgh was the sole owner until 1908 when Trygve Wettre was brought on board. William Duborgh died in a car accident in France in 1929, and Trygve Wettre became sole owner.

Duborgh also served as a vice consul for Argentina from 1907. He chaired Kristiania Commerce School, was a board member of Kristiania Gasværk and Nationaltheatret and deputy board member of the Bank of Norway. He was a supervisory council member of Livsforsikringsselskapet Brage (chair from 1918), and Handels- og Exportbanken.

He was decorated as a Knight of the Order of St. Olav, was a Commander of the Order of the Dannebrog and the Order of Vasa.
