= Georg Herman Krohn =

Norwegian actor

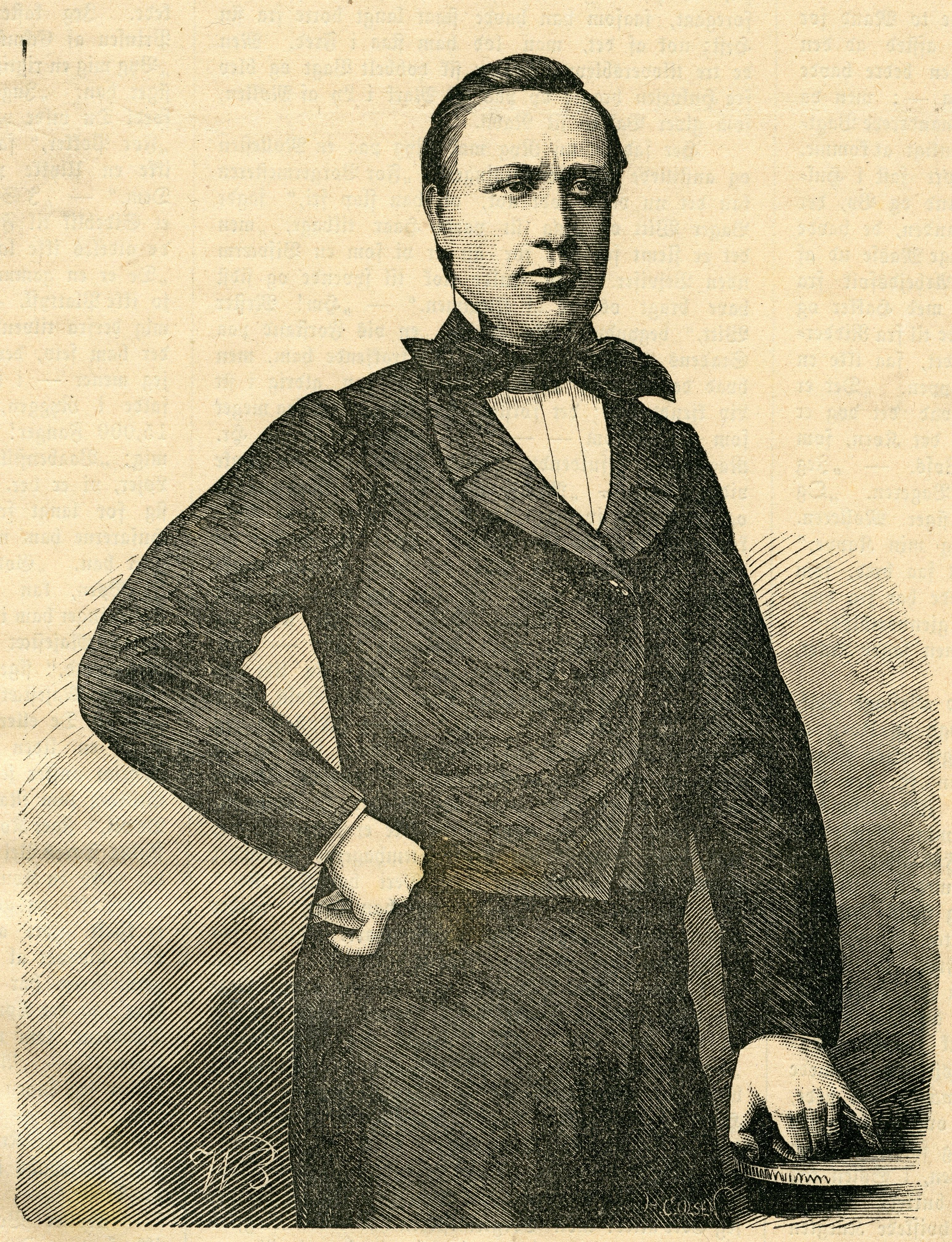
The drawing of Georg Krohn by Hans Christian Olsen

Georg Herman Krohn (16 August 1831 – 15 May 1870) was a Norwegian actor.

He was born in Bergen. He made his debut at Det Norske Theater in 1856, and later worked at Christiania Norske Theater and Christiania Theater.

He was the father-in-law of William Duborgh and Bertram Dybwad.
