= Sempill Mission =

British mission with the objective of developing the naval aviation forces of Japan

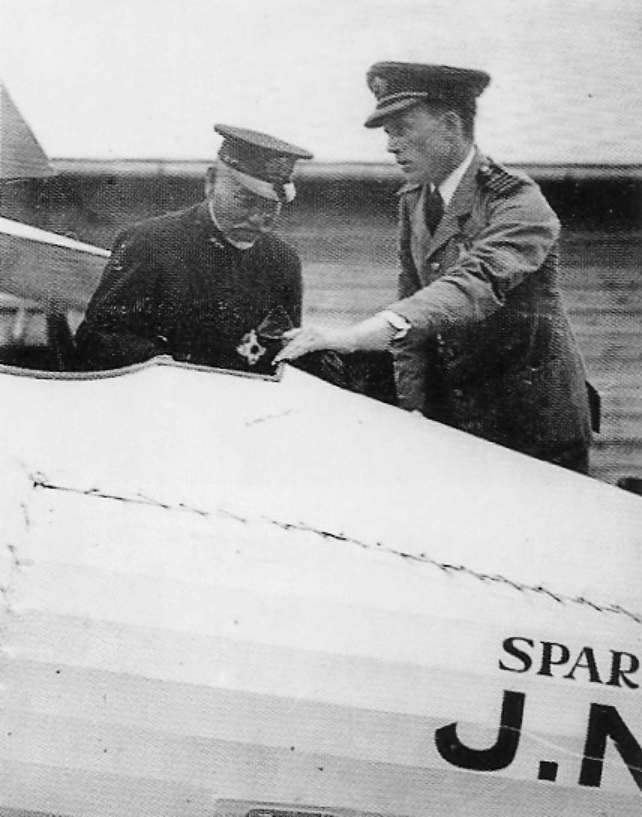
Captain Sempill showing a Sparrowhawk to Admiral Tōgō Heihachirō, 1921.

The Sempill Mission was a British naval aviation technical mission led by Captain William Forbes-Sempill and sent to Japan in September 1921, with the objective of helping the Imperial Japanese Navy develop its aeronaval forces. The mission consisted of a group of 30 instructors and support staff; the mission was headed by Colonel Sempill and stayed in Japan for 18 months.

== Background ==
The Imperial Japanese Navy had closely monitored the progress of aviation of the three Allied naval powers during World War I and concluded that Britain had made the greatest advances in naval aviation, they had also learned a good deal about naval aviation through their contacts within the Royal Navy. In 1920, a representative had also been sent to Britain to observe air operations off the decks of Furious. In 1921, the Japanese government formally requested that the British dispatch a naval air mission, in order to develop and to provide a professional edge to Japanese naval aviation. There were reservations on the part of the Admiralty about granting the Japanese unrestricted access to British technology, yet after refusing the Japanese a total of ten times, the British government relented and sent an unofficial civil aviation mission to Japan.

== Arrival of the mission ==
The Sempill Mission was led by Captain William Forbes-Sempill, a former officer in the Royal Air Force experienced in the design and testing of Royal Navy aircraft during World War I. The mission consisted of 30 members, who were largely personnel with experience in naval aviation and included pilots and engineers from several British aircraft manufacturing firms. The British technical mission left for Japan in September with the objective of helping the Imperial Japanese Navy develop and improve the proficiency of its naval air arm, the British government also hoped it would lead to lucrative an arms deal. The mission arrived at Kasumigaura Naval Air Station the following month, in November 1921, and stayed in Japan for 18 months. Although civilians, the Japanese granted active commissions to all members of the mission and a suitable uniform was provided. Sempill was given the rank of a naval captain by the Japanese while other members of the team were given lesser ranks.

The Japanese were trained on several new British aircraft such as the Gloster Sparrowhawk; as the mission also brought to Kasumigaura, well over a hundred aircraft comprising twenty different models, (Note: Among the aircraft brought to Japan by the mission were the Avro 504k trainer, Gloster Sparrowhawk fighter, Parnall Panther carrier reconnaissance aircraft, Short Type 184 reconnaissance seaplane, Blackburn Swift and Sopwith Cuckoo torpedo bombers, and the Supermarine Channel and Felixstowe F.5 flying boats.) five of which were then currently in service with the Royal Air Force, including the Sparrowhawk. These planes eventually provided the inspiration for the design of a number of Japanese naval aircraft. Technicians became familiar with the newest aerial weapons and equipment-torpedoes, bombs, machine guns, cameras, and communications gear. While naval aviators were trained in various techniques such as torpedo bombing, flight control and carrier landing and take-offs; skills that would later be employed in the shallow waters of Pearl Harbor in December 1941. The mission also brought the plans of the most recent British aircraft carriers, such as HMS Argus and HMS Hermes, which influenced the final stages of the development of the carrier Hōshō. Although Hōshō was already launched by that time, she became the first aircraft carrier laid down as such in the world when she was commissioned in 1922, one year before Hermes.

== Impact ==
By the time the last members of the mission had returned to Britain, the Japanese had acquired a reasonable grasp of the latest aviation technology and the Sempill mission of 1921–1922, marked the true beginning of an effective Japanese naval air force. Japanese naval aviation also, both in technology and in doctrine, continued to be dependent on the British model for most of the 1920s. The Imperial Japanese Navy were also aided in their quest to build up their naval forces by Sempill himself, who had later become a Japanese spy. Over the next 20 years, the British Peer provided the Japanese with secret information on the latest British aviation technology. His espionage work helped Japan rapidly develop its military aircraft and its technologies before the Second World War.

== Bibliography ==
- Evans, David C; Peattie, Mark R (1997). Kaigun: strategy, tactics, and technology in the Imperial Japanese Navy, 1887–1941. Annapolis, Maryland: Naval Institute Press. ISBN 0-87021-192-7.
- Peattie, Mark R (2007). Sunburst: The Rise of Japanese Naval Air Power, 1909-1941. Annapolis, Maryland: Naval Institute Press. ISBN 978-1-61251-436-9.
- Polmar, Norman (2006). Aircraft Carriers: A History of Carrier Aviation and Its Influence on World Events, Volume I: 1909-1945 (illustrated ed.). Potomac Books, Inc. ISBN 1-57488-663-0.
