= Ragnar Wettre =

Ragnar Wettre (12 June 1864 – 1940) was a Norwegian businessperson.

He was born in Kristiania as a son of Ole Wettre (1830–1898) and Christine Elisabet Johannesen (1833–1920). He was an older brother of businessman Trygve Wettre. In 1892 he married British architect's daughter Janet Katie Boyer.

He attended Kristiania Borger- og Realskole, and at the school's hundredth anniversary in 1912 he and two brothers donated 1000 kr (more than 50,000 in modern currency) to the school. Wettre worked for the company Schee & Aas from 1879. He moved to Germany in 1883 and London in 1887. In 1891 he returned to Kristiania as office manager at Chr. Christophersen, but from 1894 to 1912 he was a partner in the London-based company Johnsen, Jørgensen, Wettre Ltd. He subsequently settled in Bekkelaget as a wholesaler.

He continued building relations between Norway and Great Britain, as board member of the Norway House, London from 1920 and the Anglo-Norse Society in Kristiania from 1921. He chaired the Schou Brewery from 1917 (board member since 1916), chaired Nyttevekstforeningen from 1923, was a supervisory council member of Handels- og Exportbanken. Forsikringsselskapet Poseidon from 1919 and Saugbrugsforeningen from 1920 and board member of Drammen Paper Mill. He also chaired the Riksmål Society branch in Oslo. In 1940 he left the Schou Brewery, Saugbrugsforeningen, and also a position as deputy board member of Lilleborg.

He was elected a Fellow of the Royal Geographical Society in 1903.

He was decorated as a Knight of the Order of St. Olav. He was buried at Vestre gravlund.
