= Mark Peattie =

American academic

- Born: 3 May 1930; Nice, France
- Died: 22 January 2014 (aged 83); San Rafael, California
- Scientific career
- Fields: Japanology, Military, Imperial History
- Institutions: Stanford University; University of Massachusetts; University of Hawaiʻi; Harvard University; Princeton University Press; Columbia University; University of California; University of Michigan

Mark R. Peattie (May 3, 1930 – January 22, 2014) was an American academic and Japanologist, renowned for his expertise in modern Japanese military, naval, and imperial history. Born in Nice, France, and later residing in San Rafael, California, Peattie made significant contributions to the study of Japan's wartime history. Throughout his career, he published extensively on the subject and was a respected figure in the field of Japanese studies.

== Early life ==
Mark Peattie was born to Louise Redfield and Donald C. Peattie, an American botanist and author when they were living in southern France. His family later moved to Illinois and then California. The novelist Elia W. Peattie was his grandmother.

== Career ==
Peattie was a professor emeritus at the University of Massachusetts Boston and a research fellow at Stanford University's Hoover Institution. He was a visiting professor at the University of Hawaiʻi in 1995.

Peattie was a reader for Columbia University Press, University of California Press, University of Hawaiʻi Press, Stanford University Press, University of Michigan Press, and the U.S. Naval Institute Press.

== Select works ==
- 2002 – Sunburst: The Rise of Japanese Naval Air Power, 1909–1941
- 1998 – Nan'yō: the Rise and Fall of the Japanese in Micronesia, 1885–1945. Honolulu: University of Hawaiʻi Press. ISBN 978-0-824-81087-0; OCLC 16578691
- 1997 – Kaigun: Strategy, Tactics, and Technology in the Imperial Japanese Navy, 1887–1941 (with David C. Evans). Annapolis, Maryland: U.S. Naval Institute Press.
- 1996 – The Japanese Wartime Empire, 1931–1945 (with Peter Duus and Ramon H. Myers). Princeton: Princeton University Press.
- 1975 – Ishiwara Kanji and Japan's Confrontation with the West.
