= Den Norske Remfabrik =

Norwegian belting and rubber manufacturer

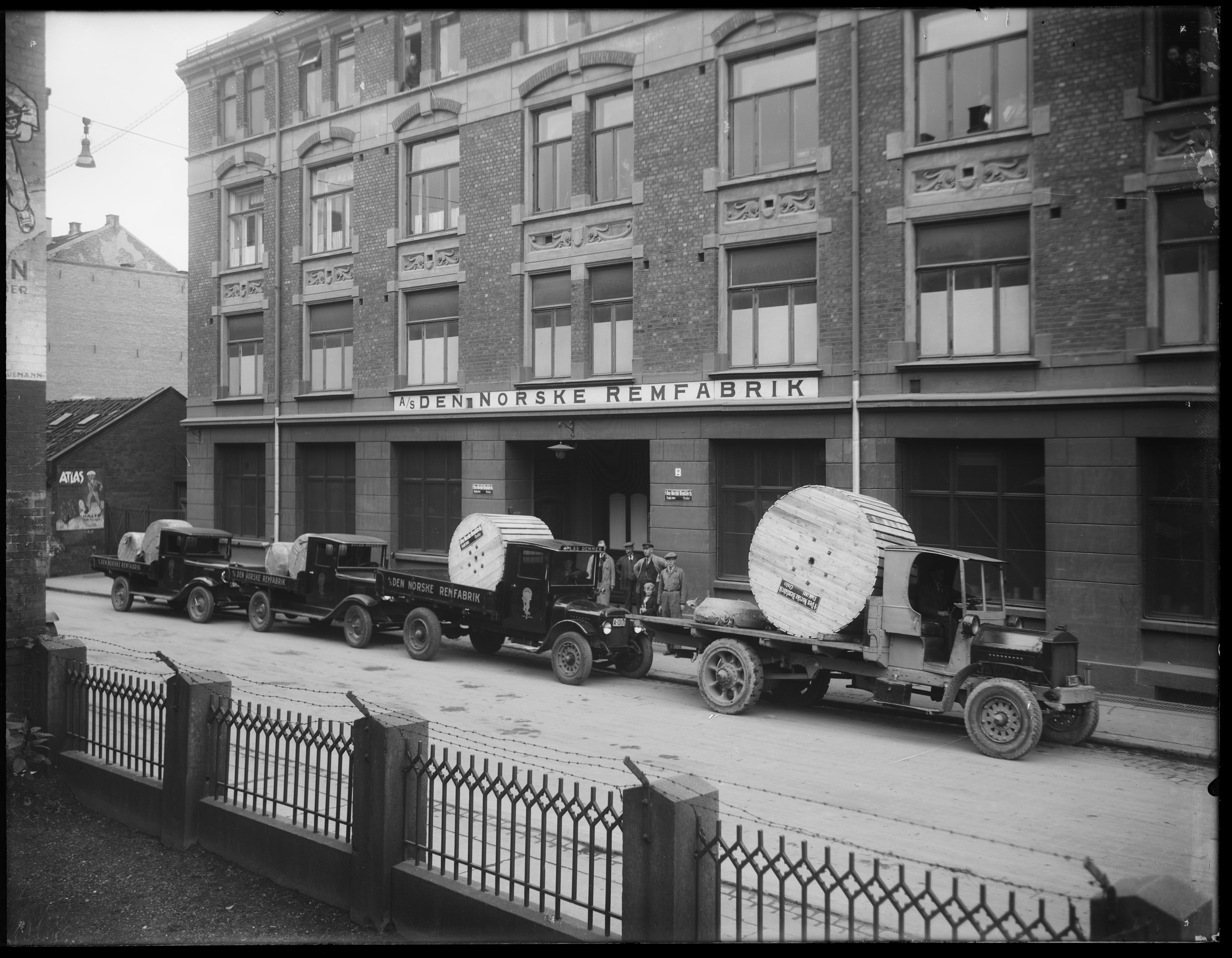
- Company type: Aksjeselskap
- Industry: Belting, technical rubber
- Founded: 1891
- Defunct: 1985
- Fate: Acquired by Trelleborg; later operations continue
- Headquarters: Oslo, Norway
- Key people: Anthon Berg, Adolf Baumann
- Products: Drive belts, conveyor belts, technical rubber and leather goods

Den Norske Remfabrik (Norwegian for "The Norwegian Belt Factory") was a Norwegian company producing belts and seals of leather, rubber, and plastic for engines, machines, and conveyor systems. The firm was established in Kristiania (now Oslo) in 1891 and had production in several places around the country. Part of the company carries on today in Mjøndalen, while other parts were sold to the Finnish company Metso and closed in 2009.

== Belts and bands ==
Belts, such as drive belts, were central to transmitting power from turbines, stationary steam engines, and later electric motors directly to working machines in industry and workshops. Through large industrial buildings ran systems of shafts, gears, and transmissions that were largely tied together by belts of leather, rubber, or later plastic materials. Belts were also used in the earliest cars to couple engine and wheels, and in conveyor belts. Today the technology is found mainly in all kinds of conveyor belts in industry, airports, crushing plants, and agricultural machines, and still in cars, such as the timing belt in vehicles with combustion engines.

== History ==
Den Norske Remfabrik was established in Kristiania in 1891 by the businessman Anthon Berg. The following year the wholesaler Olaf Bernts was taken on as a partner, and in 1894 Adolf Baumann took his place and in time took over the leadership, his son Adolf Baumann Jr. leading the company on until 1965.

The factory developed quickly as a supplier of this important wearing equipment, that is, equipment subject to wear that often had to be replaced and thus gave steady good sales. Production included drive belts and conveyor belts in all dimensions, all kinds of balata and gutta-percha goods for technical use, as well as leather belts, rawhide belts, sewing and beater belts, and technical leather articles. The belts were given the Atlas trademark and won awards at several exhibitions at home and abroad.

=== Factory by the Akerselva ===
Production was gathered from various premises in the center into a new factory in Christian Kroghs gate 2-8 by the Akerselva. Designed by the architect Ove Ekman, it was built in 1899, and the rear building down toward the river was added around 1930, designed by Ekman's associate Sverre Knudsen. The company achieved large domestic sales and a significant export. After the First World War it helped start Norsk Sumatra Plantage Co. to secure its own raw materials for production, while leather raw materials came partly from its own tannery at Grønland and partly from import.

=== From Oslo to regional development ===
The prices and sizes of electric motors fell drastically after 1950, and each machine got its own motor, so the need for belts almost entirely disappeared, and the company specialized more in technical rubber and conveyor belts, especially for the stone and mining industry. Production of plastic laminate for the panel and furniture industry was also started under the brand Nordlite.

In the 1960s and 1970s the company became one of many to move from Oslo to district municipalities, helped by local provision for industrial establishment and buildings and by state support and loan schemes through the Industry Bank and the Regional Development Fund (DU). The company moved both its administration and its laminate and rubber-goods production to a new building at Kolbotn in 1963–1964. The laminate production was sold to Hydro and Hunton in 1966, and the competitor Viking Remfabrikk in Oslo was bought in 1969. At the same time some smaller product lines and equipment were sold to Askim Gummivarefabrikk, which placed this production at its Stavanger branch, a move that also allowed the rubber-goods factory to adopt its best-known brand name for footwear and tires and change its name to Viking-Askim.

In 1971 the company's technical-rubber department moved to a SIVA building at Kleivi in Ål, bringing 30 new jobs to Hallingdal. In 1972 construction began on a SIVA building at Stomner in Kongsvinger, put into full operation in February 1974 with 75 employees and closely tied to the main plant at Kolbotn, where management and the raw-material and finished-goods stores remained. The company at this point had large production, exports to 25 countries, and plans for major expansion, but the optimism turned after 1975, the international mining market in particular failing.

In 1977 Aftenposten reported that the Kolbotn plant would be closed after several years of financial difficulties in the group, with 140 employees to lose their jobs. A dozen or so office functions were transferred to Kongsvinger, but no production jobs, and there were already reduced staffing and a three-day working week at the other plants.

=== Changing owners and corporate groups ===
In the 1980s the company gained various new owners. The Mehren family took over the Ål factory in 1982, and under the name Mehren Rubber the business was carried on with declining staffing, from about 60 to 25, when the factory was moved to Askim in 1997.

The remaining company at Kongsvinger was taken over in 1985 by the Swedish rubber group Trelleborg, the factory then having around 100 employees. The merged company was named Trelleborg Atlas and was sold on to the Finnish Metso Minerals in 2001. In 2009 Metso decided to concentrate production at fewer plants, and the Kongsvinger factory was closed and production moved to Finland.

Mehren Rubber was sold to Trelleborg in 2006 and gathered at the galoshes plant in Mjøndalen, which Trelleborg had taken over when it bought Viking Askim in 1987. In 2021 this factory was taken over by local investors, who carried it on as Vipo.

== Bibliography ==
- Norsk industri i tekst og billeder. A. M. Hanches Forlag. 1897.
- Haller, Geo. (1933). Norske varer i hus og hjem.
