= Det Norske Luftfartsrederi =

Norwegian airline, 1918–1920

Aktieselskapet Det Norske Luftfartsrederi or DNL was Norway's first scheduled airline, founded in 1918 and operated services between Bergen, Haugesund and Stavanger in 1920. It operated Supermarine Channel flying boats. It was also one of the seven founding members of the International Air Traffic Association, the predecessor of the International Air Transport Association.

== History ==
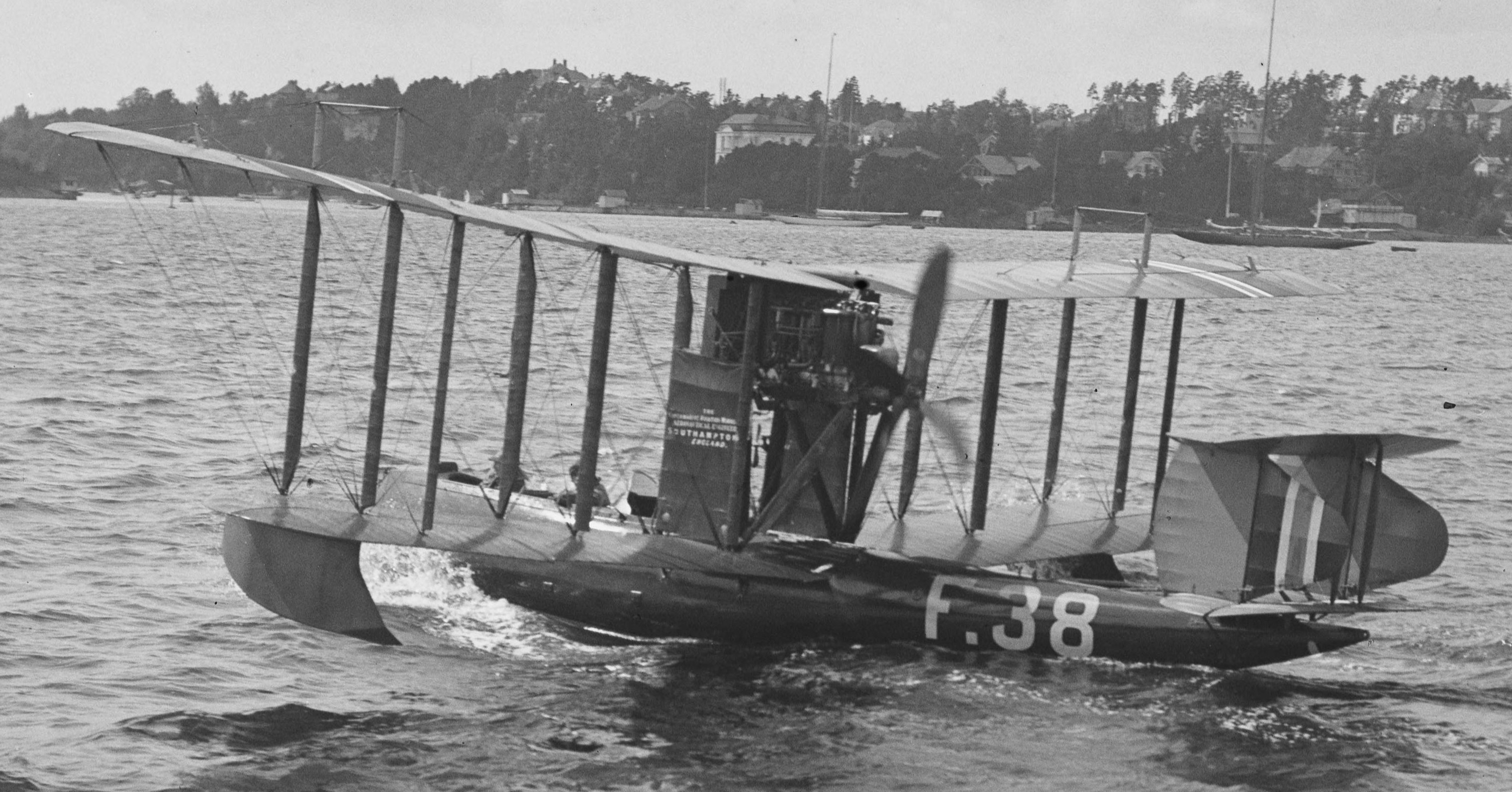
A Supermarine Channel with Det Norske Luftfartsrederi in 1920.

The first idea to launch a scheduled airline in Norway was put forth at a board meeting in Norsk Aero Klubb (at the time called Norsk Luftseilandsforening) on 27 February 1918. An invitation to purchase shares for NOK 5 million was issued, and by March NOK 3.3 million had been raised. The idea was presented to the public in Tidens Tegn on 2 March, where scheduled services to England, Denmark and the whole coast were presented. Travel times were to be 4 hours and 30 minutes from Oslo (at the time called Kristiania) to Copenhagen, to Bergen in 2 hours and 45 minutes, to Trondheim in 4 hours and to Kirkenes in 17 hours. A route to Stavanger to Aberdeen would be done in 4 hours and 30 minutes.

By about 19 March, the airline had established offices in Prinsensgate in Oslo. It had hired Wilhelm Keilhau as managing director, and Gyth Dehli and Hjalmar Riiser-Larsen as technical consultants. The company had its founding meeting on 25 December 1918, but was not registered until 16 March 1920. In 1918, the company applied for a government grant of NOK 1.3 million to start a postal route between Oslo and Kristiansand, and an international route from Oslo via Gothenburg to Copenhagen. The company was granted NOK 60,000 to operate a trial route between Bergen, Haugesund and Stavanger. On 28 August 1919, DNL was one of seven airlines which founded the International Air Traffic Association at a meeting in The Hague.

DNL planned to use the island Lindøya outside Oslo as its base, and applied for a 99-year lease from the Oslo Port Authority. They recommended that the application be denied, since it would interfere with ship traffic and there were already negotiations with the state to purchase the island. Yet, the airline was allowed to operate temporarily from Lindøya. In Stavanger, the airline bought land off Hafrsfjord.

The company ordered three Supermarine Channel flying boats. The delivery of the planes were delayed and not until 16 August did operations commence, then with Friedrichshafen FF.49C planes owned and operated by A/S Aero. Later, DNL used its ownd planes and crew. One of the aircraft crashed, but without fatalities. On one flight, a drunk passenger tried to choke the pilot Riiser-Larsen, but he managed to fight off the passenger. Operations were terminated on 15 September. Several problems were encountered, due to weather conditions, mechanical failures of the aircraft, local strikes and delivery problems, so the regularity achieved was a disappointing 94%. Most flights were made with mail only, and only a total of 64 passengers were carried. Additionally the anticipated increase in freight volume did not happen, and towards the end, only around 300 letters were carried per flight.

The company was liquidated on 13 December 1920, although this was not completed until 5 June 1923. The owners received 72% of the share capital. Keilhau stated in the 1950s that until then, the company had been the most profitable airline in Norwegian history.
