= Saunders-Roe =

1929–1964 aircraft manufacturer

Saunders-Roe Limited
- Industry: Aerospace, Engineering
- Founded: 1929
- Defunct: 1964
- Fate: Merged with Westland Aircraft
- Headquarters: East Cowes, Isle of Wight
- Key people: Samuel Edgar Saunders; Alliot Verdon Roe; Francis Percy Beadle; Maurice Brennan; Ray Wheeler
- Products: Aircraft; Helicopters; Hovercraft

Saunders-Roe Limited, also known as Saro, was a British aerospace and marine-engineering company based at Columbine Works, East Cowes, Isle of Wight.

== History ==
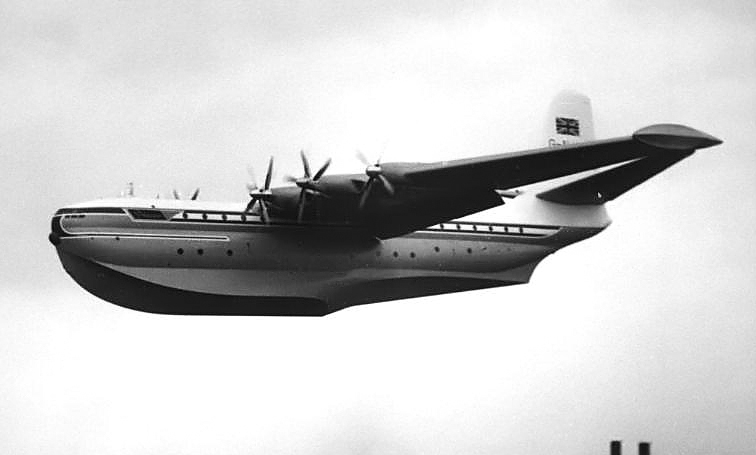
Saunders-Roe Princess G-ALUN displaying at the Farnborough SBAC Show in September 1953

The name was adopted in 1929 after Alliott Verdon Roe (see Avro) and John Lord took a controlling interest in the aircraft and boat-builders SE Saunders. Prior to this (excepting for the Sopwith/Saunders Bat Boat) the products were Saunders, the A4 Medina for example dating from 1926. Sam Saunders, the founder, developed the Consuta material used in marine and aviation craft.

The Saunders-Roe interest in aviation didn’t prevent the firm from continuing with the boatbuilding activities associated with SE Saunders.

Saunders Roe concentrated on producing flying-boats, but none were produced in very large quantities – the longest run being 31 Londons. They also produced hulls for the Blackburn Bluebird. During World War II, Saro manufactured Supermarine Walrus and Supermarine Sea Otters. Their works at Beaumaris, Anglesey, modified and serviced Catalinas for the Royal Air Force.

In January 1931 Flight magazine revealed that Whitehall Securities acquired a substantial holding in Saunders Roe. Whitehall Securities was already a large shareholder in Spartan Aircraft of Southampton, and arising out of this investment Spartan was effectively merged into Saunders Roe.

In 1938 Saunders-Roe undertook a re-organisation of the commercial and administrative sides of its business. First, the marine section, consisting of the shipyard and boat-building business, was transferred to a new company, Saunders Shipyard Ltd., all of the shares of which were owned by Saunders-Roe Ltd. Mr. C. Inglis was appointed shipyard manager. Secondly, the plywood section of the business carried on at the factory on the River Medina was transferred to a new company, Saro Laminated Wood Products Ltd., in consideration for a majority of the shares therein. Laminated Wood Products Ltd., which had marketed most of the plywood output, also merged its interests into the new company. Major Darwin, managing director, left the company. On the aircraft side of the business Mr. Broadsmith continued as director and general manager. All other senior posts in the executive staff remain unchanged.

In 1947 they flew the SR.A/1 fighter prototype, one of the world's first jet-powered flying boats, and in 1952 they flew the prototype Princess airliner, but the age of the flying-boat was over and the two further Princess examples to be completed were never flown. No further new seaplanes were produced here. Modification work on Short-built flying boats continued at Cowes until 1955.

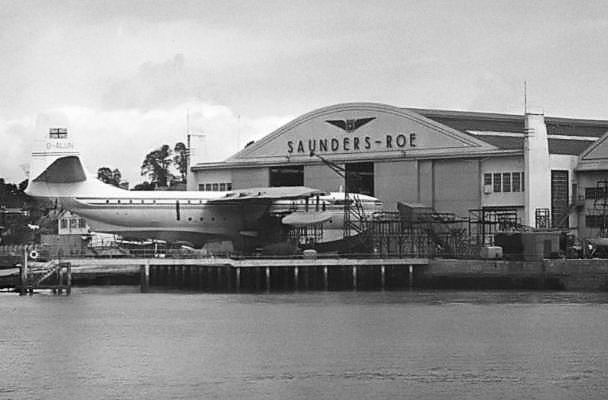
Saro works at East Cowes in September 1954 with stored Princess G-ALUN

The last fixed-wing aircraft they built was the experimental SR53 mixed-power interceptor.

In 1951 Saunders-Roe took over the interests of the Cierva Autogiro Company at Eastleigh including the Skeeter helicopter project. In September 1952 the company comprised:

- Saunders-Roe Ltd. with a Head Office in Osborne, East Cowes, Isle of Wight with works at Columbine I.O.W. and Southampton Airport.

There was a branch design office in London, during the 1950s. It was situated in Queens Square, overlooking the Great Ormond Street Hospital for Children

- Saunders-Roe (Anglesey) Ltd, Friars Works, Beaumaris, North Wales
- Saro Laminated Wood Products Ltd., Folly Works, Whippingham, I.O.W.
- Princess Air Transport Co. Ltd of Osborne I.O.W. with an office in London at 45 Parliament Street

In 1959 it demonstrated the first practical hovercraft built under contract to the National Research Development Corporation to Christopher Cockerell's design, the SR.N1.

In the same year Saro's helicopter and hovercraft interests were taken over by Westland Aircraft which continued the Skeeter family with the Scout and Wasp. In 1964 all the hovercraft businesses under Westland were merged with Vickers-Armstrongs to form the British Hovercraft Corporation. This, in turn, was taken over by Westland and was renamed Westland Aerospace in 1985, and hovercraft production was reduced to nearly nothing until the advent of the AP1-88. The company produced sub contract work for Britten-Norman, produced composites and component parts for the aircraft industry, especially engine nacelles for many aircraft including the De Havilland Canada "Dash 8", the Lockheed Hercules, the British Aerospace Jetstream and parts for the McDonnell-Douglas MD-11. By the mid-1990s, over 60% of the world's production of turboprop nacelles took place in the East Cowes works.

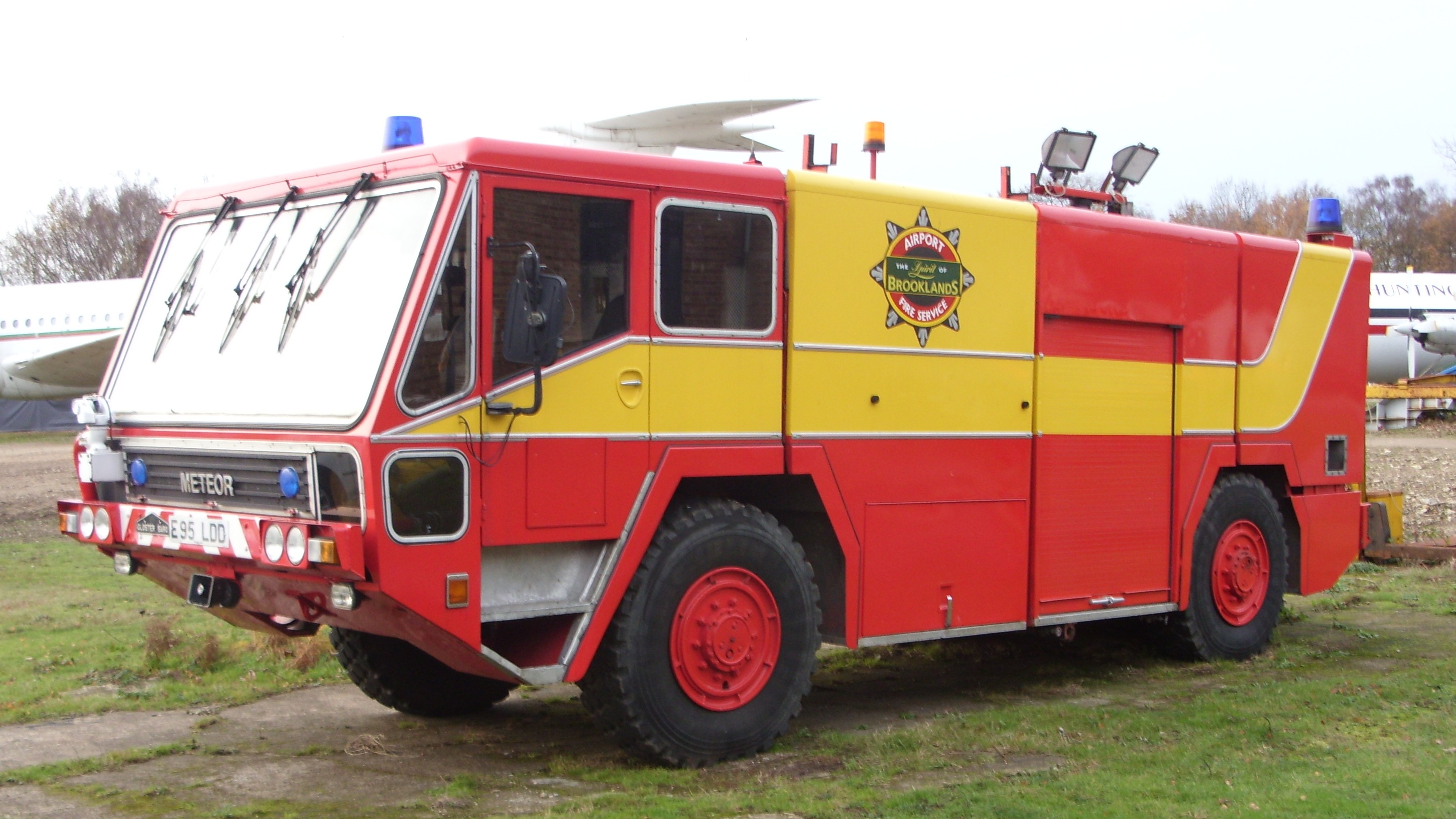
Gloster Saro Meteor light foam tender at Brooklands Museum

In the late 1960s/early 1970s the Saunders-Roe Folly Works, by then owned by Hawker Siddeley was merged with the Gloster works to form Gloster-Saro utilising both companies' expertise in aluminium forming to produce fire appliances and tankers in the Gloster factory at Hucclecote, mostly based on Reynolds-Boughton chassis. In 1984 Gloster Saro acquired the fire tender business of the Chubb with the company merging in 1987 with Simon Engineering to form Simon Gloster Saro.

In 1994 Westland was taken over by GKN, and when GKN sold off its shares of Westland to form Agusta-Westland, it retained the East Cowes works, where it continues aircraft component design and production.

Laird (Anglesey) Ltd was formed in 1968 and incorporated the Beaumaris and Llangefni factories of Saunders-Roe and the engineering business of Birkenhead shipbuilders Cammell Laird. Laird developed the Centaur, which was half Land Rover and half light tank.

Laird also manufactured dustcart bodies - principally a licence-built version of the German KUKA "Shark" (Rotopress) rotating drum compactor. Following KUKA's waste collection vehicle business being diverted to FAUN, the company is now known as FAUN Municipal Vehicles having been taken over yet again. Today, Faun manufactures portable aluminium roadways and runways at Llangefni under its TRACKWAY brand.

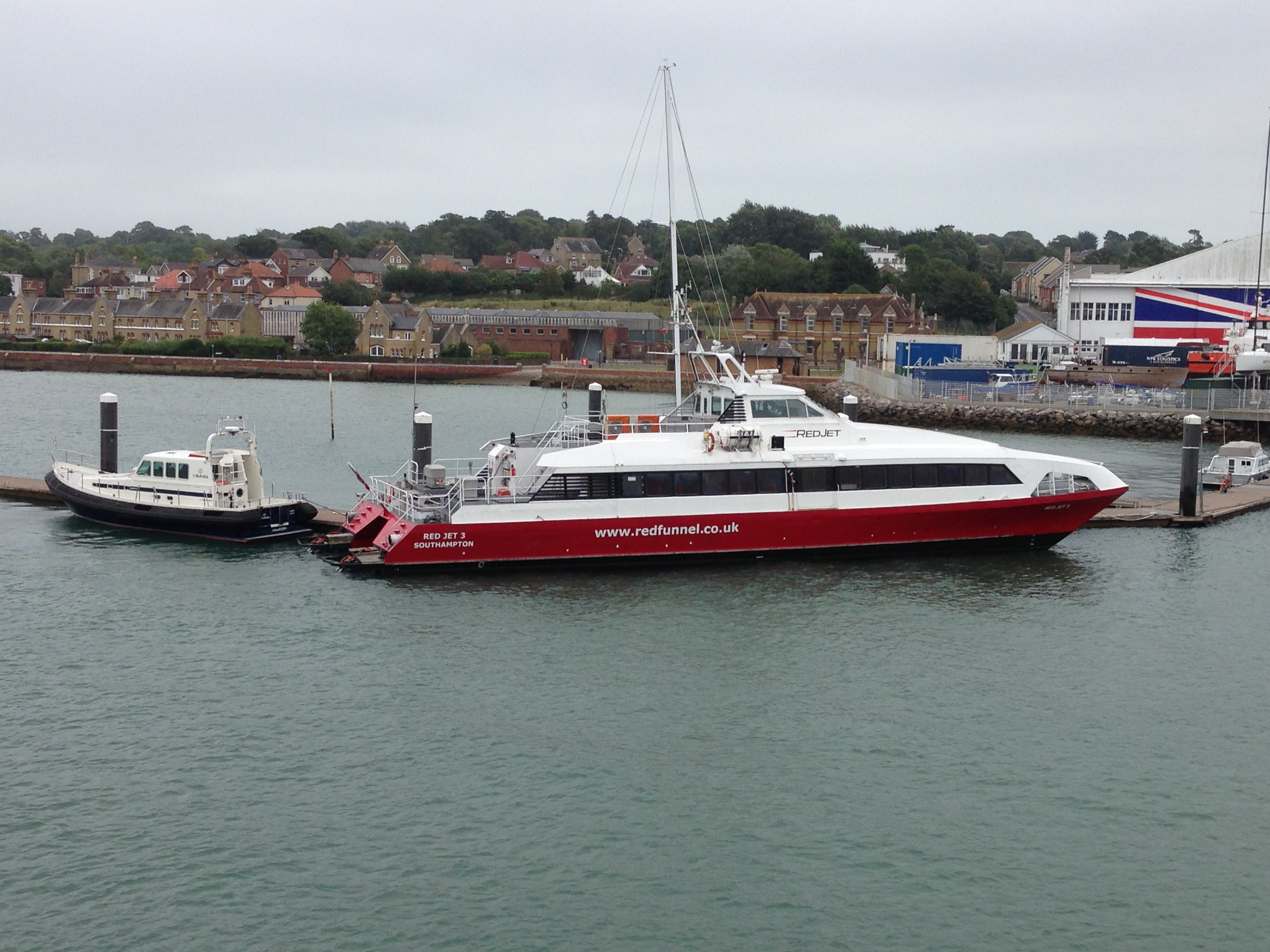
Red Jet 3 docked at the Columbine, 19 August 2018

In 2015, the East Cowes Columbine Hangar, which later became notable for its large Union Jack painted on its doors, was leased from the Homes & Communities Agency to Shemara Refit, now known as Wight Shipyard, to refit MY Shemara. They also constructed the catamaran ferry Red Jet 6 inside the hangar for Red Funnel, with the next in the series, Red Jet 7, also built there. The GKN North site had been sold in 2002 for £8m to the South East England Development Agency (an English regional development agency closed by the UK government in 2012) for the regeneration of East Cowes. This stalled with the financial crash in 2008 and is set never to achieve the site's full potential as a deep water Prime Tier 1 Marine Industrial Site.

The docks at the Columbine Hangar have also been used by Red Funnel as berths for their Red Jet catamaran ferries when not in use; for example, Red Jet 6 was berthed at the Columbine while undergoing system tests, while Red Jet 3 was docked there while on sale awaiting a buyer during 2018.

== Saunders and Saunders-Roe designs ==
=== Boatbuilding ===
- Lifeboats for the Royal National Lifeboat Institution (RNLI) including the Liverpool-class Motor Lifeboats and 51ft Barnett-class.
- Powerboats including the record breaking Miss England II in 1930 for Lord Wakefield and Blue Bird K3 in 1937 for Sir Malcolm Campbell.
- Dark class fast patrol boats built for the United Kingdom's Royal Navy, the Myanmar Navy, Finnish Navy and the Japan Maritime Self-Defense Force

=== Flying boats ===
- Saunders Kittiwake
- Saunders A.3 Valkyrie
- Saunders A.4 Medina
- Saunders A.14
- Saunders/Saro A.7 Severn
- Saro A.17 Cutty Sark
- Saro A.19 Cloud
- Saro A.21 Windhover
- Saro A.27 London
- Saro A.29 Cloud Monospar
- Saro A.33
- Saro A.36 Lerwick
- Saro A.37 Shrimp
- Saunders-Roe SR.A/1
- Saunders-Roe SR.45 Princess
- Saunders-Roe Jet Princess (paper project only)
- Saunders-Roe Duchess (paper project only)
- Saunders-Roe Queen – concept only for a 24 jet engine, 313 ft wingspan flying boat for P&O with accommodation for 1,000 passengers.

=== Land-based aircraft ===
- Saunders T.1
- A.22 Segrave Meteor – Designed by Sir Henry Segrave
- Saunders/Saro A.10 "Multigun" – 1928
- Saro-Percival Mailplane also known as A.24 Mailplane – designed by Edgar Percival, – 1931
- A.24M (Spartan Cruiser) – derived from Saro Mailplane. Built by Spartan Aircraft Limited – 1932
- Saunders-Roe SR.53 – mixed power interceptor
- Saunders-Roe SR.177 – mixed power interceptor (cancelled before completion)

=== Helicopters ===
- Cierva Air Horse, taken over from Cierva company
- Saunders Helicogyre
- Saunders-Roe Skeeter
- Saro P.531 – development of Skeeter, led to Westland Scout and Wasp
- Hiller ROE Rotorcycle

=== Hovercraft ===
- SR.N1 ("Saunders Roe Nautical 1"): First modern hovercraft
- SR.N2 First to operate a commercial service
- SR.N3 First designed for military use
- SR.N4 or Mountbatten class – large 4 prop ferry
- SR.N5 Also Bell SK-5, as PACV used in Vietnam
- SR.N6 Longer SR.N5 38 passengers
- Aircraft carrier Surface Effect Ship (SES)

=== Spacecraft ===
With the Royal Aircraft Establishment

- Black Knight
- Black Arrow
- Black Prince

The Rocket Development Division was formed in 1956 and the Rocket Test site at Highdown started functioning exactly one year later. The division was headquartered at Yeovil. It was this division, in conjunction with the Royal Aircraft Establishment, that was responsible for the design, manufacture and static testing of the Black Knight Rocket, the first of which was successfully fired at Woomera, South Australia, on 7 September 1958.

=== Military canoes, assault boats and load carriers (World War II) ===
Designed by Fred Goatley# Marine designer Mark 2 Canoe – 1941–1942 (used on the Cockleshell Heroes "Frankton Raid") Mk 2** Canoe – 1943 ( used in Leros – various, incl. Sunbeam Raids ) 12-man Assault craft c. 1940–1942 8 ton load carrier. c. 1942–1943

== Electronics ==
The Electronics Division was formed in 1948. Its progress was rapid and the division also designed and manufactured such diverse specialist equipment as Analogue Computers, Control Simulators and a variety of Electronic Equipment and Electronic Test sets associated with Guided Weapons. When using strain gauges of the normal wire type in the dynamic testing of helicopter components, notably rotor blades, Saunders-Roe found that such a high proportion of the gauges were failing that development was considerably retarded. The Electronics Division was therefore asked to devise an improved gauge and, in collaboration with Messrs. Technograph Printed Circuits Ltd., produced the foil strain gauge.

== Hydrofoil ==
- R-103 – a 17-ton hydrofoil for Royal Canadian Navy, known as "Bras d'Or". Built in 1956 by Saunders-Roe (Anglesey) Ltd. (This should not be confused with HMCS Bras d'Or, a 240 tonne hydrofoil patrol vessel, which was the result of the tests performed by the R-103.)

== Illuminated signs ==
Early in aviation, it was difficult – if not impossible – to supply uninterrupted power in aircraft. Saunders-Roe solved this problem by putting an ionising gas (tritium; ^{3}H) in small tubes. Tritium was discovered in 1934 by Lord Rutherford. The tubes ("Betalights") are made of borosilicate glass. The inside of the tubes is coated with a fluorescent powder, which glows as a result of the ionizing radiation of the tritium gas. Such a tube emits light for 15 years. Betalights were used to illuminate the flight instruments, exit signs and corridors of the aircraft produced by Saunders-Roe. When Saunders-Roe was acquired by Westland Helicopters production continued via Saunders-Roe Developments Ltd of North Hyde Road, Hayes, Middlesex (the former Fairey Aviation Head office). Betalight production was made independent under the name SRBT (Saunders-Roe Betalight Technology). A factory was established in Pembroke, Ontario, Canada, where tritium supplies are readily available. Today betalights are used in self luminous escape-route signs, under the product name Betalux.

== Mark 3 airborne lifeboat ==
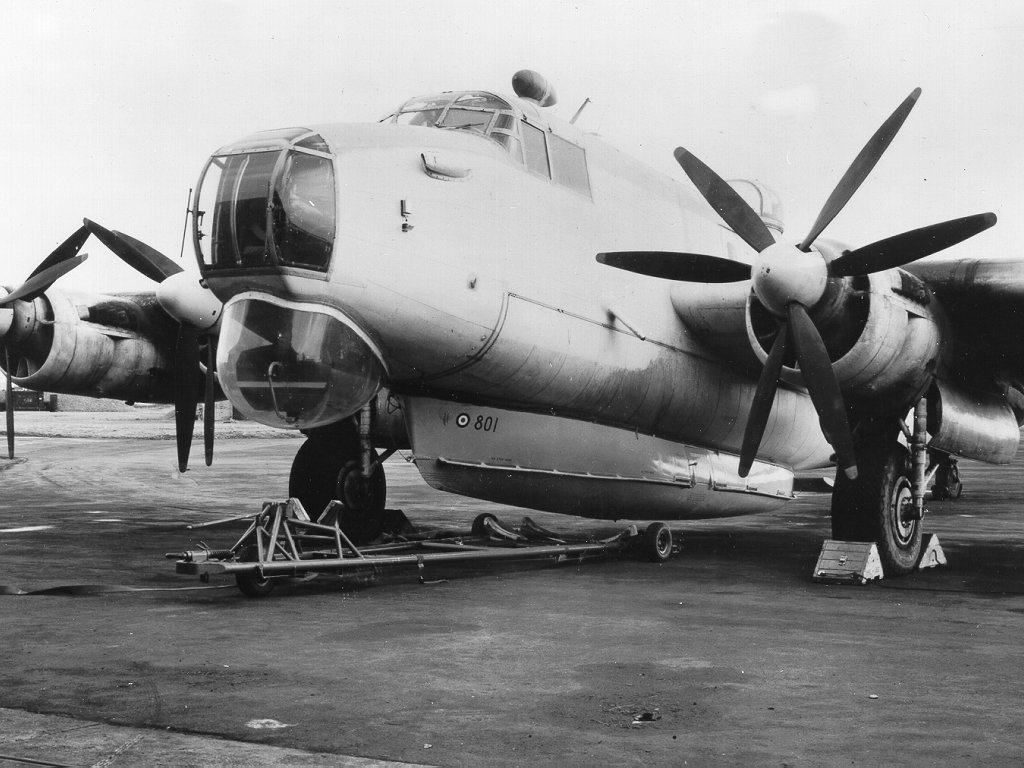
Mark 3 airborne lifeboat fitted underneath an Avro Shackleton

In early 1953, Saunders-Roe at Anglesey completed the Mark 3 airborne lifeboat to be fitted underneath the Avro Shackleton maritime reconnaissance aircraft. This model was made entirely of aluminium, previous marks being made of timber. Parachuted at a rate of 20 feet per second into the rescue zone, the craft was powered by a Vincent motorcycles HRD T5 15 hp engine; sails and a fishing kit were also provided. The Mark 3 measured 31 feet (9 m) from bow to stern and 7 feet (2 m) across the beam and held enough to supply 10 people with food and water for 14 days.

== Road vehicles ==
During World War II, Saunders-Roe opened a factory at Fryars in Llanfaes, Anglesey, converting and maintaining Catalina flying boats. In the late 1940s and 1950s the Beaumaris factory began making bus bodies under the names Saunders, SEAS (Saunders Engineering & Shipbuilding) and SARO. When AEC took over Crossley Motors, many of the design staff left and joined SARO. In pre-Atlantean days when Leyland began looking at low floor vehicles, the "Low Loader" (STF 90) bodied by SARO was similar in certain respects to the Crossley chassisless bus designs. Bodies were manufactured at Beaumaris for installing on Leyland Royal Tiger and Leyland Tiger Cub chassis; SARO bodied 250 AEC Regent III RTs for London Transport between 1948 and 1950 (RT 1152–1401), which were almost indistinguishable from the standard Weymann/Park Royal products; and some double-deck buses for Liverpool Corporation. 620 prefabricated Rivalloy (the brand name comes from rivetted (aluminium) alloy) single deck buses components for local assembly were sold to Autobuses Modernos SA, Cuba which later became Omnibus Metropolitanos, S.A. Another large customer was Auckland Regional Transport in New Zealand who took the Rivalloy body on 90 Daimler Freeline chassis. In 1948 the only double deck bodies to be exported were 20 ordered by South African operator Durban Motor Transport which were mounted on AEC Regent III chassis. In the UK large numbers of SARO bodies were specified by the British Electric Traction group on Leyland Tiger Cub chassis, operators including Trent, East Midland, Ribble, Yorkshire Traction and the Northern General Group. An integral version of the body design powered by a Gardner 5HLW engine was bought by Maidstone & District.

The factory later passed to Cammell Laird who mainly used it for producing refuse-collection vehicles, but when Metro Cammell Weymann had a production backlog, they completed a batch of MCW-style double deck forward-entrance highbridge bodies on Leyland Titan PD3 for Brighton Corporation, these were numbered 31–5, registered LUF131-5F and delivered in June and July 1968, they were unusual as front engined half-cab buses built to be driver operated.

== See also ==
- Aerospace industry in the United Kingdom
- Goatley boat
