= John Stanley Booth =

- Born: 9 December 1919; Totties, Yorkshire, England
- Died: 5 June 1958 (aged 38); Boscombe Down
- Military career
- Allegiance: United Kingdom
- Branch: Royal Air Force
- Service years: 1938–1945
- Rank: Squadron Leader
- Service number: 41658
- Conflicts: Battle of France
- Awards: Distinguished Flying Cross; Queen's Commendation for Valuable Service in the Air
- Other work: Chief Test Pilot

Squadron Leader John Stanley Booth DFC & Bar (9 December 1919 – 5 June 1958) was an English aviator, a pilot in the Royal Air Force during the Second World War, and, after the end of the conflict, became a test pilot. After spending almost ten years working for the Saunders-Roe company, he was killed in 1958 while test flying the SR.53, an experimental interceptor.

== Early life ==
Born on 9 December 1919 near Huddersfield in Yorkshire, Booth joined the Royal Air Force in 1938 on a short service commission and in October 1939 he was sent to France with 59 Squadron as part of the British Expeditionary Force. During the Battle of France, he was awarded a Distinguished Flying Cross (DFC) for his gallantry. Wounded in May 1940, Booth was sent back to England for convalescence, and after recovering, was posted to Canada where he served a number of tours as a flying instructor.

In 1943 he returned to operations. For the next two years he flew night fighters and intruder operations with No. 100 (Bomber Support) Group, for which he was awarded a bar to his D.F.C.

== Test Pilot ==
After his tours with Bomber Command, he was posted to "A" Squadron at Boscombe Down in late 1944. In 1945, he was a student on the third course run at the Empire Test Pilots' School. Following his demobilisation from the Royal Air Force in 1946 he joined Power Jets as a test pilot. He moved to Short Brothers, initially at Rochester, but later Belfast. For the next two years he conducted most of the test flying on the Sturgeon, carried out development of the Solent, and flew the civil version of the Shetland.

In February 1949 Booth joined Saunders-Roe as deputy to their chief test pilot Geoffrey Tyson. In this role, he assisted with test flying of the Saunders-Roe SR.A/1, the world's first jet flying boat fighter, and the development flying of the Princess.

In January 1956 Tyson retired and Booth was appointed the chief test pilot. In this role, Booth was responsible for the development flying of the Saunders-Roe SR.53 mixed power interceptor. He made the maiden flight of the first prototype (XD145) on 16 May 1957, demonstrated it at the Farnborough (S.B.A.C) air-show in September and made the first flight of the second prototype (XD151) on 6 December 1957.

On the fifth of June, 1958, Booth was testing XD151. During take off its rocket engine failed and it overrun the runway at Boscombe Down. During the accident, the SR.53 hit a landing light, rupturing its fuel tanks and burst into flames, Booth was killed in the fire. A few days following the accident, Booth was posthumously awarded the Queen's Commendation for Valuable Service in the Air. Booth was married with two children.

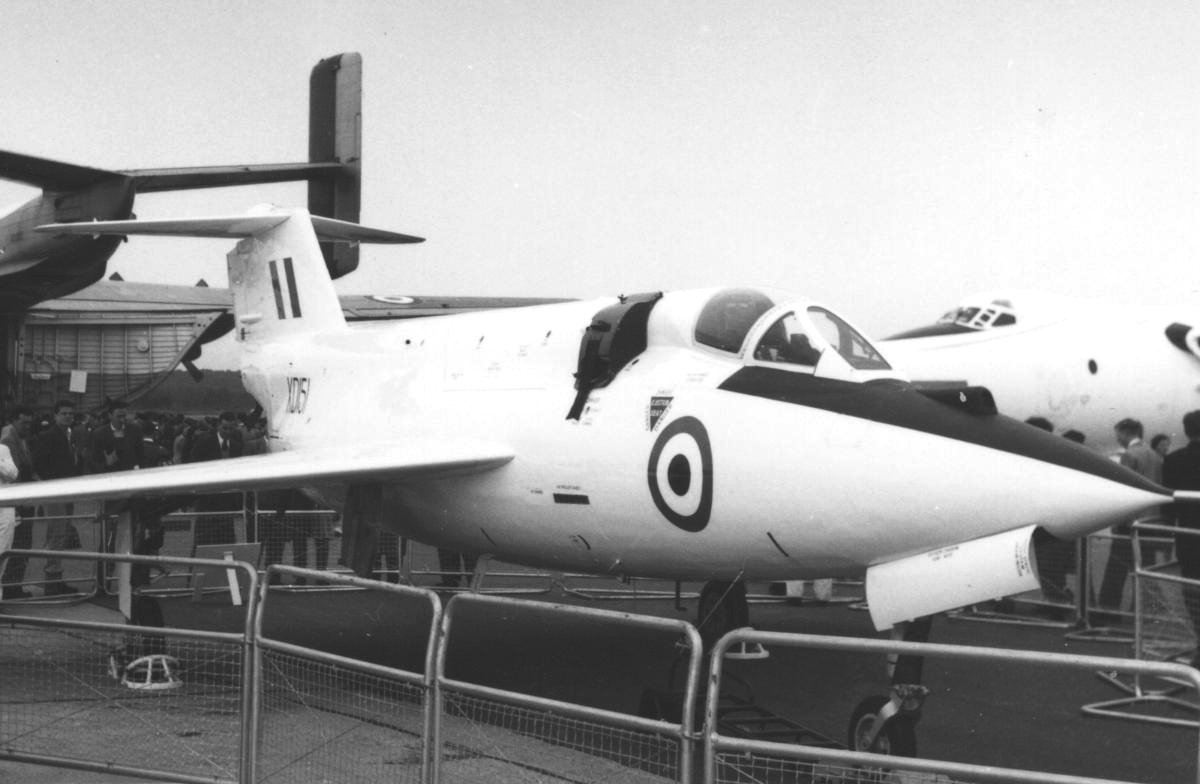
XD151, the second prototype Saunders-Roe SR.53, in which Booth lost his life, on display at the 1957 Farnborough Air Show

== Honours and awards ==
- 6 August 1940 – Pilot Officer John Stanley Booth (41658) is awarded the Distinguished Flying Cross.
- 16 January 1945 – Acting Squadron Leader John Stanley Booth DFC (41658), R.A.F.O 239 Squadron is awarded a bar to his Distinguished Flying Cross.
- 12 June 1958 – Squadron Leader John Stanley Booth DFC, Chief Test Pilot, Saunders-Roe Ltd is awarded a Queen's Commendation for Valuable Service in the Air.
