= Avro 528 =

528

General information
- National origin: United Kingdom
- Manufacturer: Avro
- Number built: 1

History
- First flight: 10 December 1916
- Retired: 1917

The Avro 528 was an unsuccessful large span single-engined biplane built to an Admiralty contract in 1916. It carried a crew of two; only one was built.

== Development ==
Very little is known about the Avro 528 apart from a photograph and a general arrangement diagram. It was a two-seat single-engined biplane ordered by the Admiralty in 1915, and not even the task for which it was intended is recorded. It had some similarities with the Avro 519 (a single-seater intended for the Royal Flying Corps (RFC)) and the twin-seat 519A, built for the Royal Naval Air Service (RNAS), though neither of these were armed and both had 150 hp Sunbeam Nubian engines rather than the 225 hp Sunbeam of the 528. Both the 519s and the 528 had some shared features with the Naval Avro 504.

It was a large three-bay biplane with unswept, unstaggered and constant-chord wings of unequal span, the lower plane having a span 10 feet 0 inches (3.05 m) less than the upper. Ailerons were carried on the upper wings; both wings folded for storage. The fuselage had similarities with the RNAS 504s though the overall length of the 528 was greater by about 4 feet (1.2 m): both had a generous fixed fin in contrast to the all moving, comma shaped rudder of the RFC's 504s. The vertical stabiliser was also close in size to that of the 504, but the rather rectangular horizontal tail was nearly 60% greater in span. Like the 519s, the top of the fuselage carried a raised decking that provided deeper cockpits for the pilot, placed under the trailing edge of the wing and the observer/gunner, in a separate cockpit close behind equipped with a ring-mounted gun. The fixed single-axle undercarriage had no central skid.

The Sunbeam engine drove a four-bladed propeller and had a single, central, and nearly vertical exhaust pipe. There were two radiators, mounted edge on (longitudinally) between the wings, rather than the single but similarly mounted radiators of the Avro 519s and the Avro 527. Two tank-like features are shown in both image and diagram on the lower wings just inboard of the innermost interplane struts; they may be fuel tanks.

== Operational history ==
The first flight was on 19 December 1916 at Avro's Hamble factory. The aircraft remained troublesome, with a variety of propellers being tried but the Admiralty lost interest and the 528 last flew in April 1917.

== Specifications ==
Data from Avro Aircraft since 1908

General characteristics

- Crew: 2
- Length: 33 ft 8 in (10.26 m)
- Wingspan: 65 ft 0 in (19.82 m)
- Gross weight: 5,509 lb (2,504 kg)
- Powerplant: 1 × Sunbeam , 250 hp (187 kW)

Armament

- 1× 0.303 in (7.7 mm) Lewis machine gun in rear cockpit
- provision for bombs in nacelles under lower wing
