= Geoffrey Tyson =

- Born: 4 February 1907; Purley, Croydon, England
- Died: 9 January 1987 (aged 79); Isle of Wight, England
- Known for: Test pilot
- Aviation career
- Rank: Flight lieutenant

Geoffrey Arthur Virley Tyson FRAeS OBE (4 February 1907 – 9 January 1987) was an RAF officer, barnstormer and test pilot. He is best known for his aerobatic skills and the test flying of the Saunders-Roe SR.A/1 and Princess flying boats.

== Early life and RAF career ==
Geoffrey Arthur Virley Tyson was born in Purley on 4 February 1907. As a school boy during the First World War, he watched the RFC flying at Croydon Airport. He was educated at Whitgift School and on leaving was articled to an estate agent in Croydon. However, after 18 months in 1925, he resigned and joined the Royal Air Force on a short service commission.

He underwent his ab-initio flying training at the No. 5 Flying Training School RAF and, after qualifying in February 1927, was posted to No. 25 Squadron at Hawkinge, flying Gloster Grebes. During this tour, he damaged a Grebe while attempting to land off a stall turn. For this incident he was reprimanded by the commanding officer, Robert Brooke-Popham and confined to base for a month. Showing promise as a pilot he was posted to the Central Flying School on the instructors course, obtaining the A1 category. In 1927 he was promoted to flying officer and in December was posted to No. 32 Squadron, flying the Armstrong Whitworth Siskin. While flying at 500 ft in a two-seater Siskin, the aircraft burst into flames. He made a rapid landing with himself and the student pilot jumping out while the aircraft was still moving. In 1929 he was an instructor with the Oxford University Air Squadron (O.U.A.S).

== Barnstormer ==
In 1931, on the expiry of his commission he went on the reserve; living a spartan life working as a flying club instructor, first with the Maidstone School of Flying at West Malling, then with the Scarborough Aero Club and later with the South Downs Aero Club Still on the reserve, he was promoted to flight lieutenant in 1932

In 1933 he was invited to join Sir Alan Cobham's air circus by H.C Johnson, who was Cobham's chief Pilot and Tyson's friend from his O.U.A.S. tour. His first job was taking passengers joy riding in a Fox Moth. On one such flight in July 1933 in Limerick he was involved in a lethal mid-air collision with a Gipsy Moth. Although the undercarriage of his Fox Moth was badly damaged Tyson succeeded in landing the machine and neither he nor his passengers were injured. Both the pilot and the passenger of the Gypsy Moth were killed.

When Charles Turner-Hughes left the air-circus in 1934 to work for Armstrong Whitworth, Tyson took over as the circus's aerobatic pilot. He helped develop new stunts such as picking up a handkerchief using a hook on a wing-tip; diving under a line of flags, looping from the dive and ending the loop by diving under the flags again. However, his forte was inverted flying, on the 25th Anniversary of Louis Bleriot crossing the channel, he flew from Dover to Calais inverted in a Tiger Moth. He always finished his performance by a straight, low inverted fly-past. However, on one occasion the pin fastener of his Sutton harness worked out. Falling out of the cockpit, he hung on to the spade grip of his joy-stick, which pulled the elevators up, and his aircraft into a downward half loop, throwing him back into the aircraft with his knees on the floor and chin on the stick. He looked out of the cockpit and realised he was flying right-side-up although 10 ft off the ground. Luckily the accidental downward half-loop had taken place over a deep valley, and the extra few feet had provided sufficient clearance.

Contemporary reports of Tyson's stunt flying gave praise and criticism in equal measure:

Mr. Tyson's displays on the Lincock and Tiger Moth were clean, but we cannot help deprecating the spirit which leads him to fly so low and close to the crowd, particularly when inverted. An error of judgement or an untoward occurrence under those conditions would produce an accident, doing incalculable harm to aviation as a whole... He is very accurate indeed ... but here again takes, we feel, undue risks in his desire to give the public a good show. Many times he had his aeroplane in such a position that an accident would have been more than likely had his engine failed. The handling of his machine, however, leaves no doubt about his ability as a pilot.

Never were slow rolls so slow and rocket loops so interminably prolonged. With the extra power, enabling him to climb quite steeply in the inverted position, the recovery from a disturbingly low final inverted passage over the crowd is rather less disturbing. Fit. Lt. Tyson looks safe enough, though engines do stop occasionally, even in the year 1935.

In the winter months he worked for Cobham in other capacities. He flew the tanker aircraft in some of the earliest successful flight-refuelling experiments and made a demonstration tour of India with an Airspeed Courier and Envoy. At the end of the 1935 season the Cobham show closed down and Tyson became a test pilot for Avro. In this role he put his aerobatic skills to good use, demonstrating their aircraft to customers such as Finland.

== Test pilot ==
In 1937, Cobham's company, Flight Refuelling Ltd offered Tyson a position on their flying staff, with a suggestion of a refuelling base managership if trials went well. Tyson left Avros and went back to refuelling. Again, his precision aerobatic flying stood him in good-stead, because at that time contact with the tanker was made by catching a trailing weight in a hook on the wing-tip. Any error meant that either the trailing rope got caught in the airscrew or the weight swung back and struck the underside of the wing. During Cobham's pioneering transatlantic crossings using in-flight refuelling in August 1939, Tyson flew the H.P. Harrow tanker that refuelled the Short Empire flying boats, Caribou and Cabot. He also made significant contributions to the design of the refuelling equipment and was named in the Cobham's patent.

Tyson's work with Flight Refuelling Ltd continued into 1940 until Caribou and Cabot were lost off the cost of Norway. After this happened, he joined Short Brothers working as assistant test pilot to John Lankester Parker. For the remainder of the Second World War he carried out development flying and production-testing of Sunderlands and Stirlings. To understand how the Stirling behaved operationally, he flew with W/C Gilmour, D.S.O., D.F.C., on a raid over Kassel. In December 1944 he flew as co pilot with John Lankester Parker, on the maiden flight of the Short Shetland flying boat. When Parker retired from active test flying, Tyson was appointed Chief Test Pilot in his place. In this role he carried out the flight development testing of the prototype Sturgeon.

In 1946, Shorts announced their relocation from Rochester to Belfast; Tyson moved to Saunders-Roe as chief test pilot. On 16 July 1947 he made the maiden flight of the Saunders-Roe SR.A/1 twin-jet fighter flying-boat and was responsible for much of its demonstration and test flying over the following four years. Reminiscent of his barnstorming days, he flew it inverted at the 1948 Farnborough air show. This display was described in Flight Magazine as "One of the most dramatic pieces of demonstration flying ever witnessed in this country". On 12 August 1949 Tyson was in attendance when Eric Brown flew the SR.A/1. During Brown's landing the SRA/1 struck a submerged log and sank. Tyson leapt from the launch, into the water and kept Brown afloat until he could be rescued.

During the late 1940s Saunders-Roe was developing the Princess trans-Atlantic flying boat. In 1951 Princess Air Transport Co Ltd was formed to tender for their operation and Tyson was appointed as one of the directors. (Note: Princess Air Transport Company's other directors were M. D. N. Wyatt (chairman), Sir Archibald Philip Hope, 17th Baronet, Mr. P. D.Irons, and Capt. H. W. C. Alger) On 22 August 1952, Tyson made the maiden flight of the Princess prototype, G-ALUN. This flight lasted for 35 minutes, in which Tyson flew a complete circumnavigation of the Isle of Wight. According to author Phillip Kaplan, the Princess had not been intended to fly that day;only taxiing tests had been scheduled. However, Tyson had decided to take off due to the excellent weather conditions. He later quipped "Well, she simply wanted to fly, so I let her!" Tyson put G-ALUN quickly through several test flights with the aim of allowing the flying boat to appear at the 1952 Farnborough Airshow, which he just managed after a total of seven hours flight time. There he made a low run at 280–300 m.p.h., past the stands, culminating in an almost vertical bank. Later it was revealed that the princess was flying so fast that a problem with the powered flight control system had almost prevented him rolling back upright. He also flew it at the 1953 Farnborough airshow making low runs that "made up for any dull moments experienced earlier in the programme". Flight testing continued until 27 May 1954 when G-ALUN made its final flight.

In 1955 Tyson was awarded the on R. P. Alston Memorial Prize in recognition of his contributions to the flight testing of marine aircraft and in 1956 was awarded the OBE in the 1956 new years honours· In January that year he stepped down as chief test pilot, handing the role over to John Stanley Booth. He left Saunders-Roe and joined Dunlop's aviation division as technical sales manager. He died in the Isle of Wight in January 1987 at the age of 79. Eric Brown said this about Tyson: "I think he is the most gifted aviator I have seen, in the sense that he had that touch, ... which is the touch of the master about him. I had tremendous respect for Tyson."
