= Saunders A.14 =

A.14
- A.14 prototype (N251) at Felixstowe.

General information
- Type: Experimental flying boat
- National origin: United Kingdom
- Manufacturer: S.E. Saunders Ltd; Supermarine
- Designer: Harry Knowler
- Status: Prototype
- Primary user: Royal Air Force
- Number built: 1

History
- First flight: Late 1928

The Saunders A.14 was a test aircraft for Saunders' new metal hull construction method, being a Supermarine Southampton fitted with the Saunders' fuselage. The methods tested worked well enough to be used in SARO flying boat production from 1928 to 1938.

== Development ==
After the disappointing failure of the Valkyrie to gain orders, it was evident that Saunders' traditional wooden hulled flying boats were out of date. The Saunders A.14, sometimes known as the "Metal Hull", was a one-off aircraft to test Saunders' innovative metal hull design. This hull construction was used on all the Saunders and Saunders-Roe flying boats designed up to about 1935: the A.7, Cutty Sark, Cloud, Windhover and London. To avoid the effort of designing a complete aircraft to test their new hull design Saunders were awarded a joint contract with Supermarine to fit a standard Supermarine Southampton Mk. II with a Saunders hull. Thus, exactly as the Southampton, the A.14 was a large twin engined, triple finned biplane.

Saunders were keen to make the hull simple to construct, partly to keep costs down and partly because the company's craftsman were predominantly skilled in wood, rather than metal, work. The A.14 designer, Henry Knowler introduced two innovations, one structural and one hydrodynamic. Other manufacturers had stiffened their hulls with longitudinal stringers, riveted to the inside of the hull. These required a lot of riveting and also some complicated mechanical detail where they met the transverse frames. Knowler's design replaced the internal stringers with external corrugations in the hull plating which needed no riveting and avoided the stringer-frame intersection. They were spaced a few inches apart, so (on each side) there were five above the chine and four on the two step planing bottom. The hydrodynamic novelty was less subtle: most flying boats had used hulls which in cross section curved outwards from the keel rather than take a simple V-form, chiefly to reduce "dirty" upward spray. Such hull forms required beaten metal panels of double curvature, rather than just bent. To avoid this complication Knowler used a single curvature V-form hull which was narrower than the upper hull at the chines, filling the gap with horizontal sheeting. The hull was built of duralumin with Alclad plating. Internally the new hull was roomier than that of the metal hulled Southampton Mk II, being wider in the beam. The Saunders fuselage was a little shorter than Supermarine's, by about a foot (300 mm) and also lighter judging by the overall empty weights for the two aircraft (8,870 lb or 4,023 kg for the A.14, 9,697 lb or 4,398 kg for the Southampton). Certainly the Southampton had the more graceful lines, the rounded fuselage rising smoothly to the tail in contrast with the A.14's slab sided, linearly graded form. The two aircraft had almost identical maximum speeds, confirming Knowler's estimate that the inevitable extra drag of the external corrugations would be insignificant at the low speeds of these biplane flying boats.

Crew accommodation was rather like that of the Valkyrie and the Southampton, with dual control tandem open cockpits forward of the wings, a gunner's position in the extreme nose and two staggered dorsal gunner's cockpits aft of the wings. Since the A.14's purpose was that of a hull demonstrator, the armament was probably never installed.

== Operational history ==
The A.14 first flew towards the end of 1928 but only reached the Marine Aircraft Experimental Establishment in March 1930. The new plane V-shaped bottom was "clean" at take-off with little spray. By July, after almost flying 50 hours new structure was showing signs of weakness with slight distortions visible on the bottom just forward of the main step. In October, with a total of 75 hours in the air the buckling was more evident and the planing bottom had to be reinforced locally with internal stringers. It was a weakness that affected all subsequent Saro flying boats until the London. Nonetheless, the A.14 had shown that the corrugated method worked, albeit with some weaknesses, and Saro aircraft were built that way until the last Saro London left the works in 1938, 10 years after the A.14's first flight.

== Operators ==
United Kingdom

- Royal Air Force
  - Marine Aircraft Experimental Establishment, Felixstowe

== Specifications ==
Data from London 1988 p.75

General characteristics

- Crew: 5
- Length: 48 ft 8 in (14.83 m)
- Wingspan: 75 ft 0 in (22.86 m)
- Height: 18 ft 7 in (5.7 m)
- Wing area: 1,448 sq ft (134.5 m^{2})
- Empty weight: 8,870 lb (3,946 kg)
- Gross weight: 14,000 lb (6,350 kg) normal load
- Powerplant: 2 × Napier Lion VA W-12 watercooled , 500 hp (370 kW) each

Performance

- Maximum speed: 97 mph (156 km/h, 84 kn)
- Cruise speed: 87 mph (140 km/h, 76 kn)
- Range: 600 mi (965 km, 520 nmi)
- Endurance: 6.5 hours
- Service ceiling: 8,500 ft (2,590 m)
- Rate of climb: 390 ft/min (2.00 m/s)

== See also ==
Related development

- Supermarine Southampton
- Saro Severn
- Saro London

Aircraft of comparable role, configuration, and era

- Vickers Valentia
