= S. E. Saunders =

British marine and aero-engineering company

S. E. Saunders Ltd, was a British marine and aero-engineering company based at East Cowes, Isle of Wight in the early 20th century.

== History ==
The firm was established in 1908 to continue the use of the lightweight Consuta material previously developed by Samuel Edgar Saunders.

Having developed Consuta at the family Springfield Works at Goring on the river Thames, Sam Saunders recognised a big future for the material and formed the “Saunders’ Patent Launch Building Syndicate”. As the River Thames was only suitable for small launches, the Syndicate opened a works at East Cowes, on the Isle of Wight in 1901 to developed larger craft.

Five years later the syndicate expired; Sam Saunder had found the structure of the partnership restrictive and so decided to seek an alternative arrangement. In 1908, S. E. Saunders Ltd was established, the Wolseley Tool and Motor Car Company held a small interest.

Initially S. E. Saunders Ltd concentrated on building powerboats, gunboats etc. however with the dawn of the aviation era, Sam saw that the strong, light nature of Consuta was ideal for aircraft.

== Entry into the aviation products ==
Initially the company just built parts for other aviation concerns, such as:

- two gondolas for the engines of the first naval airship, HMA No. 1 (also known as Mayfly), then being constructed at Barrow-in-Furness.
- the hull for Tommy Sopwith's Bat Boat
- the monocoque fuselage for White and Thompson company's 1914 tractor biplane, the White and Thompson No. 3.

== Marine craft ==
They continued designing and building marine craft, including powerboats:

- Maple Leaf IV, a multi-step hydroplane which regained the Harmsworth Cup from America in 1912 and defended it successfully in the following year.

and

- Estelle I and Estelle II, both single-step hydroplanes, were built in 1928 to designs of F. P. Hyde-Beadle and constructed for the wealthy yachtswoman "Joe" Carstairs. Estelle II was raced in the 1928 Harmsworth Trophy but capsized.

== RNLI lifeboats ==
Saunders produced lifeboats for the Royal National Lifeboat Institution (RNLI), including:

- 1916 - Liverpool-class 'Pulling and Sailing' types, RNLB Mary Stanford (ON 661), described as being "38 feet long and 10 feet 9 inch wide, fitted to 14 oars double-banked, and fitted with two water ballast tanks and two drop-keels." She was stationed at Rye harbour and was wrecked there in 1928.
- 1916 - Liverpool-class 'Pulling and Sailing' types, Baltic (ON 665). She was stationed at Wells-next-the-Sea Lifeboat Station
- 1921 - Norfolk and Suffolk-class lifeboat, John and Mary Meiklam Of Gladswood renamed Agnes Cross (1921–1952) (ON 663).
- 1926 - Barnett-class 60 ft lifeboat, Emma Constance (ON 693)
- 1929 - Barnett-class 60 ft lifeboat, Princess Mary (ON 715)

== Later aviation ==
=== Non-Saunders designs ===
S. E. Saunders built a number of aircraft to the design of other organisations:

Date of design	Aircraft name	Aircraft type	Designed by
1915	Short Admiralty Type 184	Seaplane	Short Brothers
1917	Norman Thompson N.T.2B	Flying boat	Norman Thompson Flight Company
1917	Felixstowe F.2	Flying boat	Seaplane Experimental Station
1917	Felixstowe F.5	Flying boat	Seaplane Experimental Station, Felixstowe
1928	Saunders Helicogyre	Experimental helicopter	Designed by Vittorio Isacco for the British Air Ministry

=== S. E. Saunders designs ===
Date of design	Aircraft designation	Aircraft type	Remarks
1917	Saunders T.1	Two-seat, single-engined biplane	the first aircraft built to a S. E. Saunders design
1920	Saunders Kittiwake	Amphibian	
1921	Vickers/Saunders Valentia	Twin-engined biplane flying boat	S. E. Saunders supplied the hull for Vickers Limited
1926	Saunders A3 Valkyrie	Three-engined biplane flying boat	
1926	Saunders A4 Medina	Two-engined biplane flying boat	
1928	Saunders A.14	Two-engined biplane flying boat	S. E. Saunders design, active at time of formation of Saunders-Roe
1929	Saunders A.10	Single-seat, single-engined, biplane	S. E. Saunders design, active at time of formation of Saunders-Roe
1930	Saunders A7 Severn	Three-engined, biplane, flying boat	S. E. Saunders design, active at time of formation of Saunders-Roe

== Other products ==
In 1923 the company exhibited a dodecagonal (12-sided) prefabricated bungalow made from Consuta at the Daily Mail Ideal Home Exhibition. At least two were sold, one stood for many years on the outskirts of Newport, Isle of Wight, the other was assembled at South Milton, Devon and is Grade II listed.

== Formation of Saunders-Roe ==
Towards the end of the 1920s the company needed additional funding for expansion and in 1929, after Alliott Verdon Roe and John Lord took a controlling interest in the company, it was re-established as Saunders-Roe.
