= Sunbeam Spartan =

1910s British piston aircraft engine

Spartan
- Type: V-12 air-cooled piston engine
- National origin: Britain
- Manufacturer: Sunbeam
- Designer: Louis Coatalen
- Major applications: Saunders T.1
- Manufactured: 1917
- Number built: prototypes only

The Sunbeam Spartan was a British 12-cylinder aero-engine designed and built in 1916.

== Design and development ==
Louis Coatalen concentrated on water-cooled engines for the most part, but did design an air-cooled V-12 named Spartan. Little is known of this engine which had a bore of 105 mm (4 in) and stroke of 130 mm (5 in), capacity of 14.03 L (856 cu in) and output of 149 kW (200 hp) driving a propeller through a reduction gearbox. The single overhead camshaft operated two inlet and two exhaust valves per cylinder via rockers, and ignition was supplied by two 6-cyl. magnetos supplying spark to one spark plug per cylinder.

== Specifications (Spartan) ==
Data from Sunbeam Aero-Engines

=== General characteristics ===
- Type: V-12 air-cooled piston engine
- Bore: 105 mm (4 in)
- Stroke: 130 mm (5 in)
- Displacement: 14.03 L (856 cu in)
- Designer: Louis Coatalen

=== Components ===
- Valvetrain: Single overhead camshaft, two exhaust and two inlet valves per cylinder
- Fuel system: gravity fed
- Fuel type: Gasoline
- Oil system: Dry sump, pressure fed
- Cooling system: Air-cooled
- Reduction gear: ratio not known

=== Performance ===
- Power output: 149 kW (200 hp)

== See also ==
Comparable engines

- RAF 4

Related lists

- List of aircraft engines
