= Saunders Kittiwake =

British amphibian flying-boat

Kittiwake
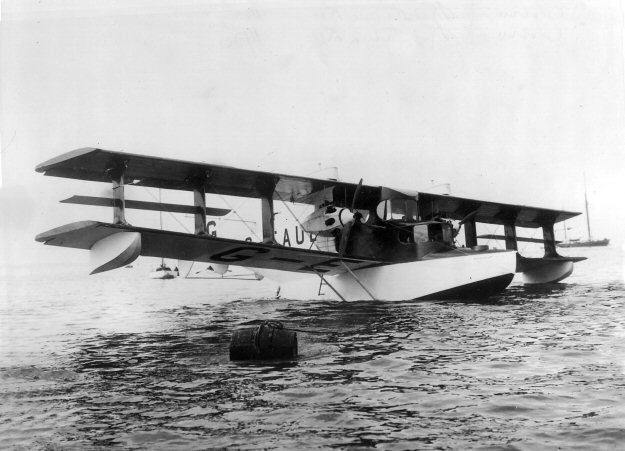
- Prototype G-EAUD.

General information
- Type: Seven-passenger amphibian
- National origin: United Kingdom
- Manufacturer: S.E. Saunders Limited
- Designer: Francis Percy Beadle
- Number built: 1

History
- First flight: 19 September 1920
- Retired: Scrapped July 1921

The Saunders Kittiwake was a British amphibian flying-boat built by S. E. Saunders at East Cowes, Isle of Wight. Only one was built, and it was scrapped after less than a year of testing.

== Design and development ==
It was designed to compete for the 1920 Air Ministry Commercial Amphibian Competition, although it was too late to enter.

The Kittiwake was a wooden amphibian biplane flying boat powered by two ABC Wasp II radial engines mounted on struts between the upper and lower wing. It had a crew of two and room for seven passengers.

The fuselage, like most of the Kittiwake was built with Saunders' patent Consuta method for jointing plywood panels with sewn copper wire. This was well tested on motor boats – it circumvented the absence of waterproof glues pre-1945 – but had only been used once before on an aircraft, Saunders' own, much smaller T.1. The hull was of two step design with a shallow V planing bottom and tumblehome sides. On its top were two accommodation levels, the lower glazed in cockpit for the two crew and above them, set back and roofed by the upper wing was the passenger space. This had its own enclosing front and side windows and held seven passengers. Though the forward part of the fuselage containing crew and passengers was married to the hull, aft of the wings these became separate, so that the Kittiwake was somewhere between a flying boat and a single float seaplane in appearance. This separation made it straightforward to mount the tail high up and well clear of the water. There was a variable-incidence tailplane with unbalanced elevators and bearing three wire braced fins, the central one carrying a balanced rudder.

The Kittiwake was a four bay biplane with high aspect ratio, parallel chord Consuta covered wings without sweep or stagger. The lower one joined the fuselage at the top of the hull, with two pairs of struts to just above the chine; the upper wing met the top of the cabin. The three outer wide chord, Consuta faired interplane struts were of I form, which simplified the interplane wire bracing. Aerodynamically, the most unusual features of the Kittiwake's wings were the interlinked camber changing devices on both the leading and trailing edges of upper and lower wings, intended to increase the speed range of a quite heavily loaded aircraft (wing loading 7.2 lb/ft^{2}). Because these lift-enhancing devices occupied most of the trailing edges, the ailerons were mounted halfway between the wings on the two outboard interplane struts. The two radial engines were also mounted mid-plane in seven sided nacelles, supported by the innermost duralumin interplane struts and steel strut braced to the fuselage. Their faired fuel tanks sat immediately above them, protruding from the upper wing surface.

As an amphibian the Kittiwake needed to have a retractable undercarriage, a most unusual feature at this time. The two main wheels were retracted with a hand crank into boxes within the hull, placed between the first and second step. These boxes had cam-operated doors to preserve the hull surface. Inevitably, this arrangement led to a very narrow track undercarriage. At the rear of the hull/central float was a combined water rudder/ tailskid. Stabilising floats with planing bottoms were fixed to the lower wing below the outermost interplane struts.

== Operational history ==
The prototype and only Kittiwake, registered G-EAUD, first flew briefly on 19 September 1920 with Norman Macmillan at the controls. The aircraft was damaged making a forced water landing immediately after takeoff when the leading edge camber gear was lost. It made a number of experimental flights in 1921 before it was scrapped in July 1921. It was the first of a family of Saunders and Saunders-Roe flying boats.

== Specifications ==
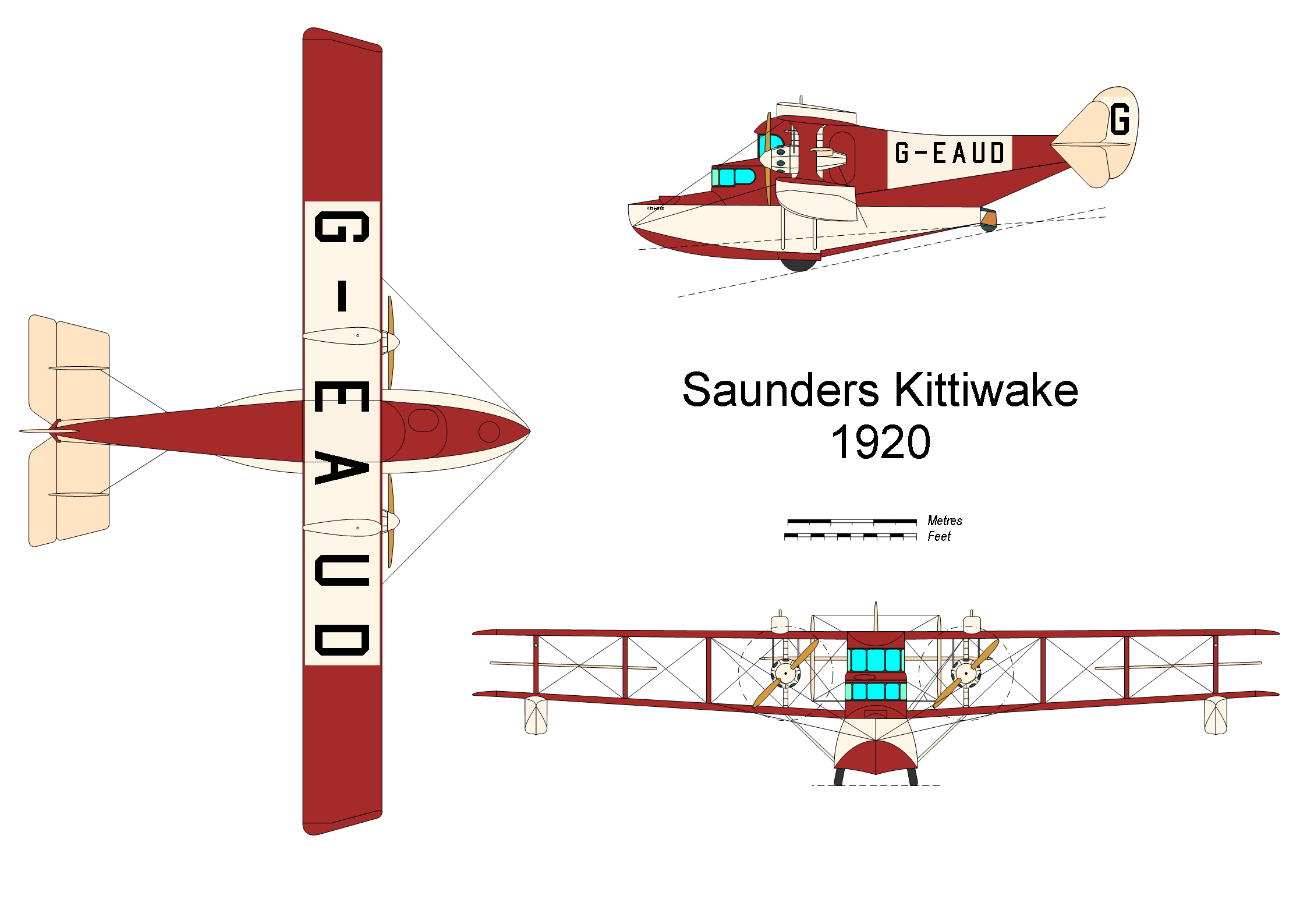
Saunders Kittiwake

Data from

General characteristics

- Crew: Two
- Capacity: Seven passengers
- Length: 43 ft 8 in (13.31 m)
- Wingspan: 68 ft 3 in (20.80 m)
- Height: 14 ft 10 1/2 in (4.534 m)
- Wing area: 864 sq ft (80.3 m^{2})
- Empty weight: 3,840 lb (1,742 kg)
- Gross weight: 6,000 lb (2,722 kg)
- Powerplant: 2 × ABC Wasp II radial engines, 200 hp (150 kW) each

Performance

- Maximum speed: 110 mph (180 km/h, 96 kn)
- Cruise speed: 92 mph (148 km/h, 80 kn)
- Range: 340 mi (550 km, 300 nmi) (approx.)
- Rate of climb: 375 ft/min (1.91 m/s)

== See also ==
Aircraft of comparable role, configuration, and era

- Supermarine Commercial Amphibian
- Vickers Viking

Related lists

- List of flying boats and floatplanes
