= Saunders-Roe Duchess =

British design for a large jet-powered flying boat

Duchess

General information
- Type: Flying boat airliner
- Manufacturer: Saunders-Roe
- Status: Cancelled

The Saunders-Roe Duchess also known as the model P.131 was a British design for a large jet-powered flying boat envisaged by Saunders-Roe, based in Cowes on the Isle of Wight.

The Duchess had been intended to follow on from the propeller-driven Princess and drew heavily upon its design. Being larger than preceding commercial flying boats, as well as the novel use of jet engines for such a vehicle, Saunders-Roe promoted the Duchess as representing the next generation of flying boats to various civilian airlines. During the early 1950s, it was also promoted for military applications such as aerial reconnaissance and military transport duties, as had been the Princess. An even larger flying boat, the Saunders-Roe Queen, was also proposed around the same time. Unlike the Princess, however, no examples of the Duchess ever flew; attempts to garner interest in the concept never resulted in any orders being placed for the type, thus it never left the drawing board.

== Development ==
Prior to the Second World War, British airline Imperial Airways had successfully used large long-range passenger flying boats, aircraft that could land and take off from the water, such as the Short Empire and Short S.26 to build up a network of long-distance routes. These flying boats had not only pioneered new aerial routes across the British Empire which had previously not been served at all, passengers were transported within an unprecedented level of comfort, being provided with luxurious first class accommodation, including a promenade, sizable galley, separate bathrooms for men and women, and individual cabins for passengers. However, operations of these flying boats had been disrupted by wartime, during which Imperial Airways had also merged with British Airways Ltd to form British Overseas Airways Corporation (BOAC) in 1940. Even prior to the war's end, the British Air Ministry was enthusiastic on the prospects for reviving the shuttered flying boat routes.

During this same era, the British aircraft manufacturer Saunders-Roe had established itself as a prominent specialist in the field of flying boats in both civil and military contexts. The company foresaw a need of increasingly larger flying boats in the postwar era. Accordingly, the firm opted to design such an aircraft, which it named the Princess, a large turboprop-powered flying boat. While several prototypes were constructed during the early 1950s, no buyers would emerge for the Princess as airlines opted to pursue the increasingly capable ground-based airliners instead, such as the newly developed de Havilland Comet, the world's first jet-propelled passenger aircraft. Despite the Princess's failure to attract orders, Saunders-Roe proposed several other flying boat designs, including the Duchess, which, unlike the Princess, harnessed the recent innovation of jet propulsion.

The design of the Duchess drew heavily upon that of the prototyped Princess. Despite this, this new design was considerably smaller than the Princess, and was to have been powered by a lower number of engines as well. Additional supporting data for the Duchess's development was provided by the Marine Aircraft Experimental Establishment (MAEE), based at Felixstowe.

Saunders-Roe vigorously promoted the Duchess both to prospective customers, both domestic and international. They displayed a model of the aircraft at the 1950 Farnborough Air Show. Though primarily marketed for civilian purposes, Saunders-Roe had also envisaged a military application for the Duchess. During the early 1950s, the company submitted a proposal under which the Duchess would have been adopted for aerial reconnaissance and military transportation purposes. Tasman Empire Airways was reportedly considering placing an order for the Duchess to use on its routes between Australia and New Zealand; however, development of the aircraft was ultimately abandoned after Saunders-Roe failed to secure any orders.

== Design ==
The Saunders-Roe Duchess would have been a high-wing cantilever monoplane, featuring a relatively conventional tail and a full-length planing bottom hull. It was provided with a swept wing. For stability, the wing would have carried floats near each wingtip; these would have incorporated a retraction mechanism to reduce drag. It would have been powered by an arrangement of six de Havilland Ghost turbojet engines mounted inside of the wingroots. The Duchess was projected to be capable of attaining speeds of up to 500 mph, unheard of amongst preceding flying boats.

The Duchess was to be furnished with a pressurised and air-conditioned cabin; in the manufacturer's envisaged default configuration, this cabin would have accommodated a maximum of 74 passengers across two separated compartments, between which a central freight hold was positioned to minimise payload impact on the flying boat's centre of gravity. The fuselage was lined with large round windows to provide passengers with exterior views.

== Specifications ==
Data from Saunders and Saro Aircraft since 1917

General characteristics

- Crew: 4 flight crew and 2 cabin crew
- Capacity: 74 passengers and 600 cu ft (17,000 L) of cargo / 66 lb (29.9 kg) luggage per passenger with 3,500 lb (1,588 kg) cargo
- Length: 124 ft 6 in (37.95 m)
- Wingspan: 129 ft (39 m)
- Wing area: 2,364 sq ft (219.6 m^{2})
- Gross weight: 130,000 lb (58,967 kg)
- Powerplant: 6 × de Havilland Ghost centrifugal-flow turbojet engines, 5,000 lbf (22 kN) thrust each

Performance

- Maximum speed: 550 mph (890 km/h, 480 kn)
- Cruise speed: 468 mph (753 km/h, 407 kn)
- Range: 2,600 mi (4,200 km, 2,300 nmi) with 21,000 lb (9,525 kg) payload
- Rate of climb: 2,900 ft/min (15 m/s)

== See also ==
Related development

- Saunders-Roe Princess
- Saunders-Roe Queen

Related lists

- List of seaplanes and flying boats
