= Henry Haberfield Thomas =

English aircraft designer

- Born: 11 May 1886; Bristol, England
- Died: 17 October 1918 (aged 32)
- Occupation: Aircraft designer
- Known for: Saunders T.1

Henry Haberfield Thomas (11 May 1886 – 17 October 1918) was an English aircraft designer and chief designer at S.E. Saunders Limited. Only one of his designs flew before he was killed by the 1918 flu pandemic.

== Early life ==
Thomas was born in Bristol on 11 May 1886.

== Aircraft designer ==
In 1909 he joined the British & Colonial Aeroplane Company moving in 1914 to Vickers in London. At the start of the first world war he moved to the Royal Aircraft Factory. In July 1916 he was appointed the chief designer at S.E. Saunders Limited on the Isle of Wight. Thomas first design to fly was the Saunders T.1 a two-seat biplane, it first flew in 1917 but only one was built. His next project was a large flying boat bomber named Great Britain designed to carry a 1,000 lbs of bombs to Berlin. The design was not built possibly due to Thomas contracting influenza from which he died on 17 October 1918.

== Family life ==
Thomas married in May 1917 to Martha Jessie Paterson and they had a daughter in May 1918.
