= Lakes Flying Company =

British aircraft manufacturer

- Company type: Aircraft manufacturer
- Industry: Aviation
- Founded: 1911
- Defunct: 1914
- Fate: Taken over by Northern Aircraft Company Limited
- Successor: Northern Aircraft Company Limited
- Key people: Captain Edward Wakefield; John Lankester Parker
- Products: Seaplanes (Lakes Water Bird, Water Hen, Sea Bird, Hydro-monoplane)
- Services: Pleasure flights, Pilot training (The Seaplane School)

The Lakes Flying Company was an early British aircraft manufacturer of seaplanes based at Windermere. In 1914 it was taken over by the Northern Aircraft Company Limited.

A registered charity The Lakes Flying Company Ltd was established in 2010, "to celebrate and to inform the public concerning the importance of the innovative contributions made to the development of naval and civil marine aeroplanes by Captain Edward Wakefield and by Waterbird".

== History ==
The first product of the Lakes Flying Company was the Lakes Water Bird, which first flew on 25 November 1911 but was destroyed in March 1912 when the Hangar collapsed in a gale. The Water Bird was the first successful British seaplane. It was followed by two further aircraft, the Water Hen and Sea Bird. The final design was the Hydro-monoplane. The seaplanes performed many pleasure flights from the Lake for the general public. In November 1914 the company was bought by the Northern Aircraft Company and the lakeside facility was expanded and pilot training (advertised as The Seaplane School) as well as pleasure flights were undertaken.

One of the pilots of the Northern Aircraft Company was John Lankester Parker, who became Chief Test Pilot for the Short Brothers company in Rochester, Kent and later Belfast, Northern Ireland.

== Aircraft ==
- 1911 Lakes Water Bird
- 1912 Lakes Water Hen
- 1912 Lakes Sea Bird
- 1914 Lakes Hydro-monoplane
