= Saro Shrimp =

A.37 Shrimp
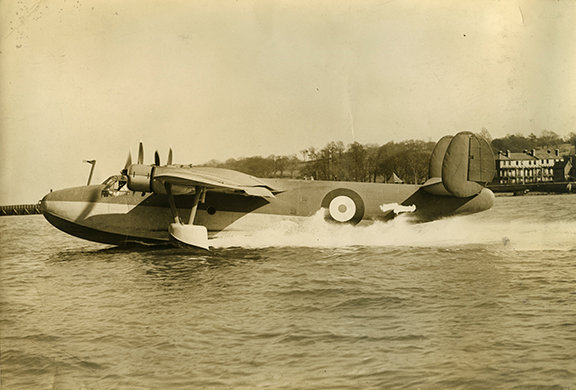

General information
- Type: research aircraft
- Manufacturer: Saunders-Roe Limited
- Designer: H Knowler
- Status: Scrapped
- Primary users: Saunders Roe Air Ministry
- Number built: 1

History
- Introduction date: 1939
- First flight: October 1939
- Retired: 1949

The Saunders Roe A.37 Shrimp was a 1930s British two-seat four-engined experimental flying boat built by Saunders-Roe Limited ("Saro") at Cowes.

== Development ==
The Shrimp was designed by H Knowler in 1939 as a half-size research aircraft as part of a development programme for the Saunders-Roe S.38 a four-engined patrol flying-boat to Specification R.5/39 – a replacement for the Short Sunderland. The R.5/39 project was cancelled but the Shrimp was completed as a private venture. Registered as G-AFZS, it was first flown at Cowes in October 1939. It was based at Beaumaris, Anglesey where a slipway was built for it. The Ministry of Aircraft Production acquired it in 1944 with the serial TK580 for tests to help the design of the Short Shetland a successor to the R.5/39 project being developed jointly by Saro and Short Brothers. For this its twin rudder tail was swapped for a single fin and the hull was modified to represent that of the Shetland.

The Shrimp was scrapped at Felixstowe in 1949.

== Operators ==
United Kingdom

- Air Ministry
- Saunders Roe

== Specifications ==
Data from Warplanes of the Second World War, Volume 5: Flying Boats

General characteristics

- Crew: 2
- Length: 43 ft 3 1/4 in (13.189 m)
- Wingspan: 50 ft 0 in (15.24 m)
- Height: 12 ft 8 3/4 in (3.880 m)
- Wing area: 340 sq ft (32 m^{2})
- Empty weight: 4,362 lb (1,979 kg)
- Gross weight: 5,700 lb (2,585 kg)
- Max takeoff weight: 6,200 lb (2,812 kg)
- Powerplant: 4 × Pobjoy Niagara III 7-cylinder air-cooled geared radial piston engines, 95 hp (71 kW) each
- Propellers: 2-bladed fixed-pitch propellers

Performance

- Maximum speed: 130 mph (210 km/h, 110 kn)
- Endurance: 3 hours
- Rate of climb: 635 ft/min (3.23 m/s)
- Wing loading: 16.8 lb/sq ft (82 kg/m^{2})

== See also ==
Related lists

- List of flying boats and floatplanes
