= Flettner Gigant =

Early German Helicopter

Gigant

General information
- Type: Helicopter
- National origin: Germany
- Designer: Anton Flettner
- Number built: 1

History
- First flight: 1932 (tethered)

The Flettner Gigant was an experimental helicopter built in Germany during the early 1930s.

== Design and development ==
Anton Flettner was an early rotary-wing pioneer in Germany, he developed a torqueless rotor by powering it with small engines fixed directly to the blades driving propellers. This arrangement drove the rotor without transmitting torque (other than bearing friction) to the fuselage.

A successful tethered flight was carried out in 1932, but the aircraft was destroyed soon afterwards when it overturned in a gale.

== Specifications (variant specified) ==
Data from Green

General characteristics

- Crew: 1
- Powerplant: 2 × Anzani 3-cyl. Y (Radial) 30hp air-cooled radial piston engine, 22 kW (30 hp) each
- Main rotor diameter: 30 m (98 ft 5 in)
- Propellers: 2-bladed tractor fixed pitch propellers

== See also ==
Aircraft of comparable role, configuration, and era

- Saunders Helicogyre
