= Lakes Water Bird =

British seaplane (1911)

Water Bird

General information
- Type: two seat experimental seaplane
- National origin: United Kingdom
- Manufacturer: A.V. Roe Ltd
- Designer: (float) E.W. Wakefield
- Number built: 1

History
- First flight: (as seaplane) 25 November 1911
- Developed from: Glenn Curtiss design

The Lakes Water Bird or Waterbird, sometimes known as the Avro Curtiss-type, is remembered as the first consistently successful British seaplane, developed by the Windermere-based Lakes Flying Company, during 1911.

== Background ==
Large bodies of water appealed to several aviation pioneers in the first two decades of the 20th century since they offered large spaces for takeoff and emergency landings. Builders also anticipated naval interest. It emerged that one of the main problems was getting the floats to leave the water, that is to "unstick". The first seaplane to fly, on 28 March 1910 at Martigues, France was built by Henri Fabre, though the machine built by Glenn Curtiss and first flown on 26 January 1911 was the first practical seaplane. In England A.V.Roe & Co had put the first Type D on floats and it left the water on 18 November 1911 at Barrow-in-Furness using stepped floats, but dropped back into the water and was damaged. It flew successfully in April 1912, although it was underpowered.

== Development ==
The Lakes Water Bird was built in 1911 for E.W. Wakefield, of the Lakes Flying Company, Windermere by A.V. Roe, who would build aircraft to the designs of individual customers. It was built as a landplane with the intention of converting it to a seaplane once testing was complete. Wakefield had been interested in waterborne aircraft since 1909 and had performed experiments with different float designs towed at speed across Lake Windermere. Unsticking problems persisted until he visited Henri Fabre in France and got useful advice on float design. The 12 ft (3.66 m) long float for the Water Bird followed Glen Curtiss' float and was built by boat builders Borwick of Bowness-on-Windermere using mahogany with aluminium and canvas.

Avro built the aircraft in Manchester, transporting it to Brooklands for its first flight on 25 May 1911. It was a two-bay single-seat pusher biplane with wings of unequal span. The outer half of each upper wing carried a pair of ailerons; the larger inner one had a semicircular trailing edge extending well behind the wing trailing edge. Bamboo outriggers fore and aft of the wings supported leading elevators, tail surfaces, and rudder. Both elevator and rudder were operated by bamboo pushrods. Power was provided by a 50 hp (37 kW) Gnome Omega seven-cylinder rotary engine driving an 8 ft 6in (2.59 m) propeller.

After testing as a landplane at Brooklands in May/June 1911, the Water Bird was taken to Hill of Oaks on Windermere and the float fitted in place of the wheeled undercarriage. A pair of cylindrical floats was mounted below the wingtips for lateral stability on the water. The successful first flight was on 25 November 1911, with ex-Avro school pilot H. Stanley Adams.

== Operational history ==
Water Bird flew intensively during December 1911 and January 1912, logging some 60 flights. The longest was for 20 miles, reaching 800 ft. In March 1912 Water Bird was destroyed in its lakeside hangar by a storm. Remnants of the aircraft (canard, float, rudder and tailplane) survived.

Water Bird was succeeded by the Lakes-built Water Hen, their first complete product. It was initially almost identical to its predecessor apart from straight-edged ailerons. Larger, later modifications removed much of the similarity between the two aircraft, the later Water Hen having a much wider central float.

== Legacy and replica ==
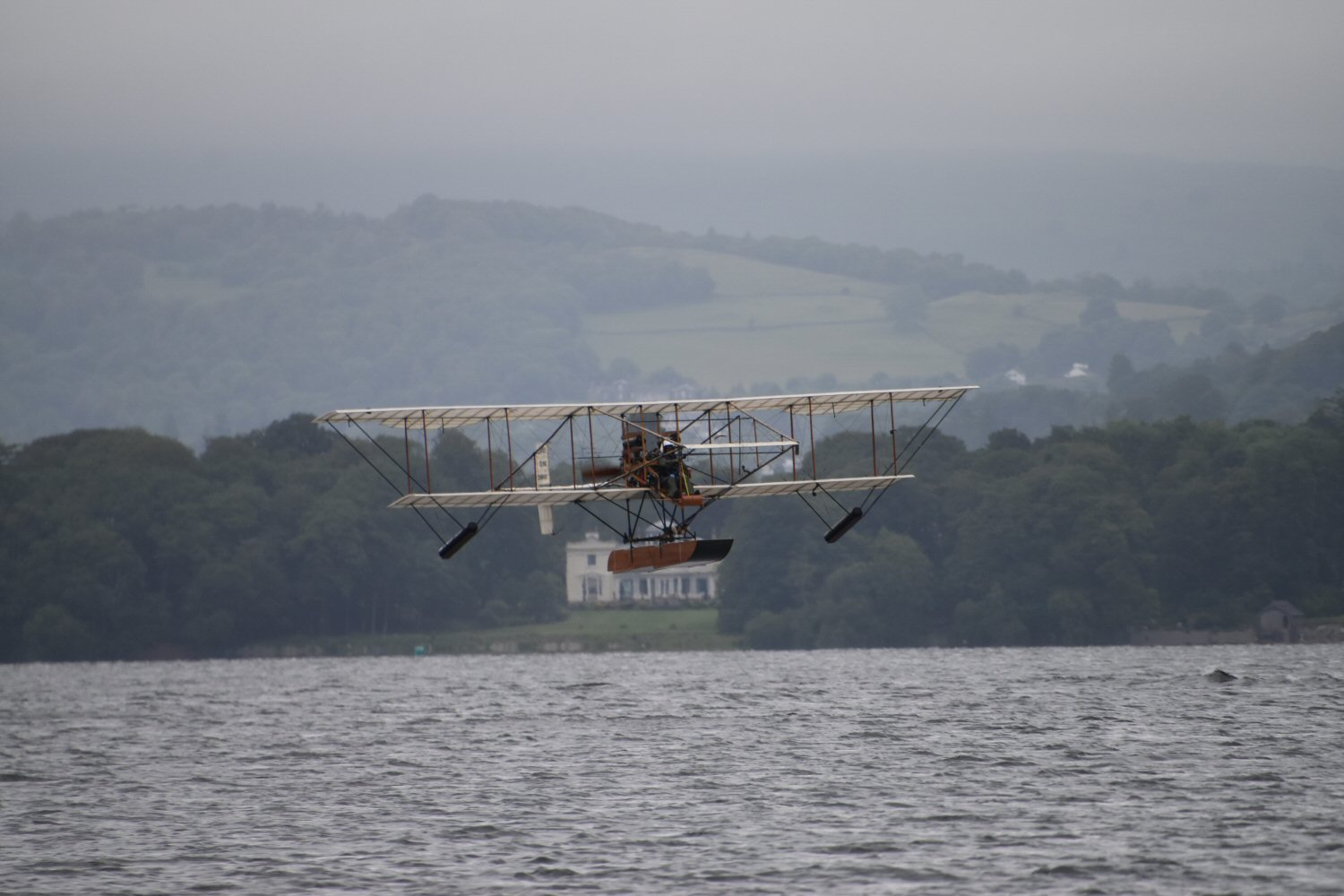
The replica seaplane, "Waterbird" takes off from Lake Windermere, 14 June 2022

A registered charity, The Lakes Flying Company Ltd, was established in 2010, "to celebrate and to inform the public concerning the importance of the innovative contributions made to the development of naval and civil marine aeroplanes by Captain Edward Wakefield and by Waterbird".

A replica of Water Bird, operated by the Lakes Flying Company, flew for the first time on 13 June 2022. A series of short flights on 13 and 14 June explored and confirmed the operating envelope and the handling characteristics of the aircraft on water and in the air, and paved the way for further flights later in 2022. The first public flight took place in September 2022. The construction of the replica was the subject of a 2022 Channel 4 documentary in the series Warplane Workshop.

== Specifications ==
Data from Jackson 1965, p. 34

General characteristics

- Crew: one
- Capacity: one
- Length: 36 ft 5 in (11.10 m)
- Wingspan: 41 ft 0 in (12.50 m)
- Wing area: 365 sq ft (33.9 m^{2})
- Empty weight: 780 lb (354 kg)
- Gross weight: 1,130 lb (513 kg)
- Powerplant: 1 × Gnome Omega 7-cylinder rotary , 50 hp (37 kW)

Performance

- Maximum speed: 45 mph (72 km/h, 39 kn)
- Service ceiling: 800 ft (244 m)
