= Saunders-Roe Queen =

Conceptual jet-powered flying boat

P.192 Queen

General information
- Type: Flying boat airliner
- Manufacturer: Saunders-Roe
- Number built: None

The Saunders-Roe P.192 Queen was a British jet-powered seaplane project designed by Saunders-Roe after the Second World War. It was intended for the carriage of passengers on intercontinental flights, especially between Great Britain and Australia. No prototype was built because of a lack of funding.

== Design and development ==
Before the Second World War, the British aircraft manufacturer Saunders-Roe (often known as Saro) had initiated plans for transatlantic seaplanes. In 1939 the firm planned a machine of 85 to 90 tons, but the start of the war altered priorities.

When Saro resumed in 1943, the studies had grown to 150 tons and ultimately became the Saunders-Roe Princess, of which only three were built.

Despite this failure, Saro was contacted by J. Dundas Meenan, consulting engineer from the firm Heenan, Winn & Steel, on behalf of the Peninsular & Oriental (P & O) shipping company. He was interested in a plane that could carry at least 1,000 passengers under the conditions of comfort of an ocean liner. Saro proposed project P.192, a 670-ton seaplane powered by 24 Rolls-Royce RB.80 Conway jet engines with 18,500 lb (8,400 kg) of thrust each. The aircraft was designed to have flown at a cruising speed of 450 mph (720 km/h) and an altitude between 30,000 and 39,000 ft (9,000 and 12,000 m). Its range would have been 2,100 mi (3,400 km). The route between London and Sydney had already been planned, via Cairo, Karachi, Calcutta, Singapore and Darwin (Australia).

The fuselage would have had 5 decks with passengers divided into 6 person compartments with seats that could convert into berths for the night, in a similar fashion to railway carriages. First class passengers would have had their own bars, dining rooms and washrooms. A galley would have served all decks via freight elevator. The crew was to have consisted of 7 flight crews with their own rest quarters, and 40 cabin crew, as well as a steward as on a liner.

The engines were installed away from the hull to avoid spray ingestion on takeoff and landing. They were to have been supplied with air through intakes in the leading edge of the wing during flight, and another set of intakes on the top of the wing while on the water.

Water rudders facilitated manoeuvring on the water.

Neither P & O nor the government were willing to finance the project, it did not go beyond the stage of the drawing board.

== Specifications (Queen) ==
Data from

General characteristics

- Crew: 7 crew and 40 cabin stewards
- Capacity: 1,000 passengers
- Length: 318 ft (97 m)
- Wingspan: 313 ft (95 m)
- Height: 55 ft 9 in (16.99 m)
- Wing area: 5,019 sq ft (466.3 m^{2})
- Max takeoff weight: 1,500,500 lb (680,615 kg)
- Powerplant: 24 × Rolls-Royce Conway turbofan engines, 18,500 lbf (82 kN) thrust each

Performance

- Cruise speed: 450 mph (720 km/h, 390 kn) at 9,000 m (30,000 ft)
- Range: 3,000 mi (4,800 km, 2,600 nmi)
- Service ceiling: 40,000 ft (12,200 m) absolute
