= Lakes Sea Bird =

Sea Bird

General information
- Type: passenger and training seaplane
- National origin: UK
- Manufacturer: Lakes Flying Co.
- Number built: 1

History
- First flight: 28 August 1912

The Lakes Sea Bird was a two-seat floatplane built during 1912 by the Lakes Flying Company using the fuselage of the Avro Duigan which had been built by Avro for John Robertson Duigan. It gave many visitors to Windermere their first flight in the summer of 1913

== Development ==
After Duigan damaged his aircraft and returned to Australia the fuselage and tail unit were sold to the Lakes Flying Co. based at Windermere, who rebuilt it as a two-seat floatplane. The straight parallel-chord high aspect ratio wings of irregular three-bay layout resembled those of Avro's Avro Type D. It was originally fitted with a single central two-step float, later changed to a pair of narrower floats, and demountable so that the aircraft could readily be used as a landplane. It was powered by a rotary 7-cylinder Gnome of 50 hp (37 kW),

== Operational history ==
The single Sea Bird carried many holiday makers in 1912-3. Later, it was restored for training but was lost in 1915 when a student pilot spun it in.

== Specifications ==
Data from Avro Aircraft Since 1908

General characteristics

- Crew: one pilot
- Capacity: one passenger
- Length: 29 ft 4 in (8.94 m)
- Wingspan: 39 ft 4 in (12.00 m)
- Height: 10 ft 6 in (3.2 m)
- Wing area: 350 sq ft (32.5 m^{2})
- Powerplant: 1 × Gnome 7-cylinder rotary , 50 hp (37 kW)

Performance

- Maximum speed: 62 mph (100 km/h, 54 kn)
