= Avro 527 =

General information
- Type: Fighter
- Manufacturer: Avro
- Designer: A. V. Roe
- Number built: 1

History
- First flight: early 1916

The Avro 527 was the last Avro two-seat fighter derivative of the basic 504 design. It was built early in 1916 for trial by the Royal Flying Corps, with the features of the Royal Naval Air Service (RNAS) Avro 504G but with a much more powerful engine; it did not reach production.

== Design and development ==
The RNAS Avro 504G was an 80 hp (60 kW) Gnome rotary-engined version of the Avro 504B with forward-firing Vickers guns and a Scarff ring-mounted Lewis gun in the rear cockpit. The Avro 527 was an equivalent two-seat fighter reconnaissance derivative version of the 504 intended for the RFC with the much more powerful, 150 hp (110 kW) Sunbeam Nubian water-cooled engine. It used standard 504K wings and a central skid, single-axle undercarriage. Naval 504s had mostly been fitted with a vertical tail with a generous fixed fin, in contrast to RFC machines with the all-moving, comma-shaped rudder, and the 527 retained the fin as used by RNAS 504s. The engine installation was very different from other 504s, with two tall, almost vertical exhaust pipes, one from each bank of the upright V-eight Nubian, discharging just above the upper wing. Its radiator was mounted edge on (longitudinally) between the wings.

The 527 first flew sometime in 1916. A version with wings of 42 ft (12.3 m) span was considered, the 527A, but there is no record of it flying.

== Operational history ==
When trialled by the RFC, pilots found that it did not climb well and that their view was obscured by the large engine, its radiator and exhausts. As a result, production was not pursued and only one aircraft was ever built.

== List of operators ==
United Kingdom -

- Royal Flying Corps

== Specifications (Avro 527) ==
Data from Avro Aircraft since 1908

General characteristics

- Wingspan: 36 ft 0 in (10.97 m)
- Powerplant: 1 × Sunbeam Nubian V-8 water-cooled piston engine, 150 hp (110 kW)
- Propellers: 2-bladed fixed-pitch propeller

Performance

- Maximum speed: 103 mph (166 km/h, 90 kn)

Armament

- Guns: 1 × rear-mounted 0.303 in (7.7 mm) Lewis Gun
