= Short Shetland =

British flying boat with 4 piston engines, 1944

S.35 Shetland

General information
- Type: Reconnaissance flying boat
- Manufacturer: Short Brothers
- Number built: 2

History
- First flight: 14 December 1944

The Short Shetland was intended as a British long-range, four-engined flying boat built by Short Brothers at Rochester, Kent for use in the Second World War. It was designed to meet an Air Ministry requirement (defined in Specification R.14/40) for a very-long range reconnaissance flying boat. The design used the company's experience with mass production of the Short Sunderland. Two prototypes flew, but the end of the war prevented the Shetland from entering production. It was the first aircraft designed with a 110 volt electrical system.

== Design and development ==
Specification R.14/40 replaced an earlier specification R.5/39 which was an up-armed revision of specification R.3/38 for a faster flying boat than the Short Sunderland. Shorts, among others, had tendered a design for R.5/39 but the ministry had changed its mind about the need for an immediate replacement for the Sunderland. R.5/39 had considered a maximum weight up to 84,000 lb (38,000 kg) – R.14/40 allowed for a maximum takeoff weight of nearly 100,000 lb (45,000 kg) with a bomb load of 20,000 lb (9,100 kg). The projected engines were the Bristol Centaurus radial or the Napier Sabre inline.

Shorts and the other British manufacturer of big flying boats, Saunders-Roe (Saro), were involved in the competitive tender for R.14/40; Saro proposed the Saunders-Roe S.41. Rather than selecting either company's design, the Air Ministry asked the companies to submit a combined project, stipulating the terms under which the work was to be shared between them. The detailed design was performed by Saro, its experience with the Saro Shrimp contributing to the hull shape, as well as building the wing. Shorts built the hull, tail and the final assembly.

== Variants ==
=== Short S.35 Shetland I ===
The first prototype and what was to be the only Shetland I (military serial number DX166) first flew on 14 December 1944, piloted by Shorts' chief test pilot John Parker as captain and Geoffrey Tyson as co-pilot. The aircraft flew without gun turrets (its role having been revised to that of unarmed transport before its maiden flight. It was delivered to the Marine Aircraft Experimental Establishment (MAEE) at Felixstowe in October 1945. Testing indicated satisfactory water handling but the stabilising floats were mounted too low and did not offer sufficient clearance for takeoffs with maximum load. Flight testing revealed problems with the harmonisation of controls and marginal longitudinal stability. Before the trials were complete, the aircraft burnt out at its moorings on 28 January 1946 as a result of a galley fire.

=== Short S.40 Shetland II ===
With the end of the war, the second prototype (serial number DX171) was completed as a civil transport and called Shetland II. It was designed to carry 70 passengers but only 40 seats were fitted. Registered G-AGVD, the Shetland Mk.II's first flight took place on 17 September 1947. After trials, it was delivered to Short's factory at Belfast, but no orders were forthcoming and it performed only limited flight trials before being scrapped in 1951.

== Specifications (S.35) ==
Data from British Flying Boats

General characteristics

- Crew: 11
- Length: 110 ft 0 in (33.53 m)
- Wingspan: 150 ft 4 in (45.82 m)
- Height: 37 ft 0 in (11.28 m)
- Wing area: 2,624 sq ft (243.8 m^{2})
- Empty weight: 75,860 lb (34,410 kg)
- Gross weight: 120,000 lb (54,431 kg)
- Max takeoff weight: 125,000 lb (56,699 kg)
- Powerplant: 4 × Bristol Centaurus VII 18-cylinder air-cooled radial engine, 2,500 hp (1,900 kW) each

Performance

- Maximum speed: 263 mph (423 km/h, 229 kn)
- Cruise speed: 183 mph (295 km/h, 159 kn)
- Range: 4,000 mi (6,400 km, 3,500 nmi)
- Endurance: 25 hr 50 min
- Service ceiling: 17,000 ft (5,200 m)
- Rate of climb: 900 ft/min (4.6 m/s)

Armament

- Guns: (as planned)
  - Three turrets, each with 2 × 0.5 in (12.7 mm) Browning machine guns in nose, mid-upper and tail positions; 1 × 0.5 in machine guns in port and starboard beam positions
- Bombs: Up to 4,000 lb (1,800 kg) of bombs or depth charges

== See also ==
Aircraft of comparable role, configuration, and era

- Blohm & Voss BV 222 Wiking
- Blohm & Voss BV 238
- Consolidated PB2Y Coronado
- Martin JRM Mars
