= Saunders Helicogyre =

Helicogyre

General information
- Type: Experimental Helicopter
- National origin: United Kingdom
- Manufacturer: S.E. Saunders Limited
- Designer: Vittorio Isacco
- Number built: 1

The Saunders Helicogyre was a 1920s experimental helicopter designed by Vittorio Isacco and built by S.E. Saunders Limited for the British Air Ministry.

== Design and development ==
Vittorio Isacco designed and built four different Helicogyre experimental helicopters between 1926 and 1935. In 1928 Air Ministry Specification 2/28 was issued to S.E Saunders for a prototype helicopter to the Helicogyre No. 3 design.

The Helicogyre had a conventional 1920s tractor aircraft fuselage and main landing gear but had an extended tailskid to keep the fuselage horizontal. At the front of the fuselage was a 100 hp (75 kW) Armstrong Siddeley Genet piston engine. Behind the cockpit was a braced post on which was fitted a four-bladed rotor, each rotor blade was fitted with a 32 hp (24 kW) Bristol Cherub piston engine at the tip.

The Helicogyre serial number K1171 was completed in 1929 and delivered to the Royal Aircraft Establishment at Farnborough by road. It was tested in the Balloon Shed, but ground tests were not completed and the programme was cancelled on 30 December 1931 without the Helicogyre having flown.

== Operators ==
United Kingdom

- Royal Aircraft Establishment

== See also ==
Aircraft of comparable role, configuration, and era

- Brennan Helicopter
- Flettner Gigant

Related lists

- List of rotorcraft
