= Sopwith Bat Boat =

Bat Boat
- The first Sopwith Bat Boat in the factory at Kingston-Upon-Thames c. 1913.

General information
- Type: Flying boat
- National origin: United Kingdom
- Manufacturer: Sopwith Aviation Company
- Primary users: Royal Naval Air Service Kaiserliche Marine; Greek Navy
- Number built: 6

History
- Introduction date: 1913
- First flight: 1913
- Retired: 1915

The Sopwith Bat Boats were British flying boats designed and built from 1912 to 1914. A single-engined pusher biplane, the Bat Boat was the first successful flying boat and amphibious aircraft built in the United Kingdom, with examples used by the Royal Navy and by Greece and Germany.

== Development and design ==
In summer 1912, the British pioneer aviator Thomas Sopwith, also a keen yachtsman and power-boat racer, started design of a flying boat, to be called the "Bat Boat" after a flying machine in Rudyard Kipling's short story With the Night Mail, to combine his interests in aviation and the sea. The resultant design was a biplane, powered by a Gnome rotary engine in a tractor configuration. The hull, which was made of Consuta, (i.e. plywood sheeting sewn in place with copper wire) was built by S. E. Saunders, the shipbuilders based at Cowes on the Isle of Wight who were experienced in the construction of power-boats, while the wings, of about 30 ft (9.15 m) span, were built at Sopwith's flying school at Brooklands. Although the aircraft was approaching completion by August 1912, it was abandoned and was never flown.

Sopwith then produced a completely new design of flying boat, still called "Bat-boat", this time a pusher configuration two-bay biplane powered by a 90 hp (67 kW) Austro-Daimler engine. The hull, which was again built by Saunders of Consuta, accommodated two people side by side in an open cockpit in line with the leading edge of the wings, and had a curved, vee-profile planing bottom. The wings, of 41 ft (12.5 m) span, were unstaggered, with lateral control by wing warping. The tail, which had no fixed fin, was carried on tailbooms connected to the wings, while an additional forward elevator was fitted to the front of the hull to supplement the normal elevator fitted to the tail. The new Bat-boat was assembled at Sopwith's new factory at Kingston upon Thames early in 1913, and was displayed at the International Aero Show at Olympia, London in February that year.

The Bat-Boat was sent from Olympia to Cowes for tests in March, with both Thomas Sopwith and Harry Hawker attempting, with little success, to get the Bat Boat airborne. The Bat Boat was wrecked by a storm. A second Bat Boat soon followed, omitting the forward elevator, while a third aircraft was built using components of the first prototype, but with a 100 hp (75 kW) Green engine and an amphibious undercarriage. Thus equipped, the third Bat Boat won the £500 Mortimer Singer prize for the first all-British amphibious aircraft on 8 July 1913.

In 1914, Sopwith laid down a second pair of Bat Boats. These two aircraft had a similar layout to the first three aircraft, but were larger, having a span of 55 ft (16.76 m), and were powered by 200 hp Salmson engines. The first of these pair was displayed at the Olympia Air Show in March 1914. Also in March, Sopwith commenced building a final Bat Boat to compete in the 1914 Daily Mail Circuit of Britain race for seaplanes. This was similar to the Salmson powered Bat Boat exhibited at Olympia, but was powered by a 225 hp (168 kW) Sunbeam engine. However, the outbreak of the First World War led to cancellation of the Circuit of Britain race.

== Operational history ==
The second Bat-Boat was purchased by the Admiralty and delivered to Calshot Naval Air Station in June 1913, being allocated the serial number 38. It was badly damaged, however, sinking at its moorings on 23 August 1913, having to be rebuilt again by Sopwith's. After serving at several Naval Air Stations, it was destroyed in a gale at Scapa Flow, Orkney, on 21 November 1914. The third Bat Boat was also purchased by the RNAS in February 1914, and given the serial number 118. It was used for a night flying demonstration at the Fleet Review in July 1914, and for bomb dropping trials at Calshot, being scrapped in February 1915 when it was found that its hull was badly rotted.

The first of the two Salmson powered Bat Boats was purchased by the German Navy Air Service, being used as a trainer at Kiel. The second Salmson powered Bat Boat was, after testing at Calshot of radio equipment, sold to Greece in July.

The Circuit of Britain machine was subject to compulsory purchase by the RNAS following the outbreak of war. While it suffered engine problems, it remained in use until April 1915.

== Variants ==
Bat Boat Type 1
Two-seat, single-engined flying boat, powered by 90 hp Austro-Daimler engine
Bat Boat Type 1A
Amphibious version of Bat Boat Type 1, based on wreckage of first prototype and powered by British built 100 hp Green E.6 engine to compete for Mortimer Singer prize. Refitted with Austro-Daimler engine before sale to RNAS.
Bat Boat Type 2
Enlarged version of bat boat, powered by 200 hp Salmson engine. Two built.
Bat Boat Type 2 (Circuit of Britain)
Improved version of Bat Boat Type 2, powered by 225 hp Sunbeam engine.

== Operators ==
German Empire

- Kaiserliche Marine

Greece

- Greek Navy

United Kingdom

- Royal Naval Air Service

== Specifications (Bat Boat Type 2) ==
Data from British Flying Boats

General characteristics

- Crew: 2
- Length: 36 ft 6 in (11.13 m)
- Wingspan: 54 ft 0 in (16.46 m)
- Height: 10 ft 0 in (3.05 m)
- Wing area: 600 sq ft (56 m^{2})
- Empty weight: 2,300 lb (1,043 kg)
- Gross weight: 3,120 lb (1,415 kg)
- Powerplant: 1 × Salmson 2M7 14-cyl. 2-row water-cooled radial piston engine, 200 hp (150 kW)

Performance

- Maximum speed: 70 mph (110 km/h, 61 kn)
- Cruise speed: 55 mph (89 km/h, 48 kn)
- Endurance: 4 hours 30 min
- Rate of climb: 500 ft/min (2.5 m/s)

== See also ==
Related lists

- List of aircraft of the Royal Naval Air Service
- List of flying boats and floatplanes
