= Saunders Valkyrie =

Large three-engined biplane flying boat

Valkyrie
- Prototype (N186)

General information
- Type: Patrol and general-purpose flying boat
- National origin: United Kingdom
- Manufacturer: S. E Saunders Ltd.
- Designer: Henry Knowler
- Status: Prototype
- Primary user: Royal Air Force
- Number built: 1

History
- First flight: June 1926

The Saunders A.3 Valkyrie was a large three-engined biplane flying boat with a wooden hull built to an Air Ministry specification. It was not found suitable for production and helped to confirm a preference for metal-hulled flying boats.

== Development ==
The Saunders A.3 Valkyrie was built in response to Air Ministry specification 22/24 for a large general duty and patrol flying boat, Saunders receiving an order for a single prototype for trials in February 1925. It was a three-engined biplane with a two step monocoque hull, circular apart from the shallow, curved planing bottom. The fuselage had no internal bulkheads and was deliberately designed to be flexible so as to absorb the shocks of landing, though there was a rigid section under the wings. As with Saunders' other wooden aircraft, Valkyrie's hull was covered with Consuta sewn stress-bearing plywood. It accommodated a crew of five. There was a pair of open tandem cockpits with dual flying controls well forward of the wing leading edge. Below this, aft and in the hull were the navigation and radio operator's position, and further aft, behind the trailing edge there were two gunners' positions, roughly in tandem but offset port and starboard, each fitted with machine guns on Scarff rings. The gunner's cockpit in the nose was similarly equipped. There were bunks and living space for all five crew in the rigid part of the hull. The fin was large and angular, carrying the braced rectangular tailplane with unbalanced elevators above the top of the hull. The fin also carried a large and prominently balanced rudder with a rudder servo surface on outriggers.

The wings were of equal span and almost no stagger, with slight sweep on the section outboard of the engines. These outboard sections each had two sets of simple vertical interplane struts, carried balanced ailerons on upper and lower planes and a V-bottomed stabilising float mounted clear of the lower wing. The wings were wooden structures with canvas covering, as was the upper centre section. The lower wing centre section was Consuta covered, mounted on a low pylon on the hull and braced to it with large N-shaped struts. The centre sections were joined by three sets of steel V-form struts, from which the Valkyrie's three 680 hp (505 kW) Rolls-Royce Condor water-cooled engines were mounted midway between the wings.

== Operators ==
United Kingdom

- Royal Air Force

== Operational history ==
The Valkyrie flew for the first time around June 1926 in the hands of Frank Courtney and went to Air Ministry trials in the late spring of 1927 where the overall assessment was unenthusiastic. Nonetheless, in August the Valkyrie joined a Scandinavian tour, organised by the Flying Boat Development Flight, together with Blackburn Iris, Short Singapore and Supermarine Southampton flying boats. This tour helped the Air Ministry to decide that the future of flying boats was with metal, rather than wooden hulls with their water absorbing properties. The sole Valkyrie was broken up in 1929.

== Specifications ==
Data from London 1988, p. 70

General characteristics

- Crew: 5
- Length: 60 ft 0 in (18.29 m)
- Wingspan: 97 ft 0 in (29.57 m)
- Height: 18 ft 5 1/2 in (5.626 m)
- Wing area: 1,967.5 sq ft (182.79 m^{2})
- Empty weight: 17,851 lb (8,097 kg)
- Max takeoff weight: 26,600 lb (12,066 kg) (overload0)
- Powerplant: 3 × Rolls-Royce Condor IIIA water-cooled V12 engines, 680 hp (510 kW) each

Performance

- Maximum speed: 119 mph (192 km/h, 103 kn)
- Cruise speed: 95 mph (153 km/h, 83 kn)
- Endurance: 9 hr 20 min
- Service ceiling: 9,600 ft (2,900 m)
- Rate of climb: 585 ft/min (2.97 m/s)

Armament

- Guns: 3× 0.303 in (7.7 mm) Scarff ring mounted Lewis guns in 2× dorsal and 1× nose positions
- Bombs: 2× 520 lb (234 kg) or 550 lb (250 kg) bombs

== See also ==
Aircraft of comparable role, configuration, and era

- Blackburn Iris
