= Saunders-Roe Princess =

British 1952 airliner flying boat

SR.45 Princess
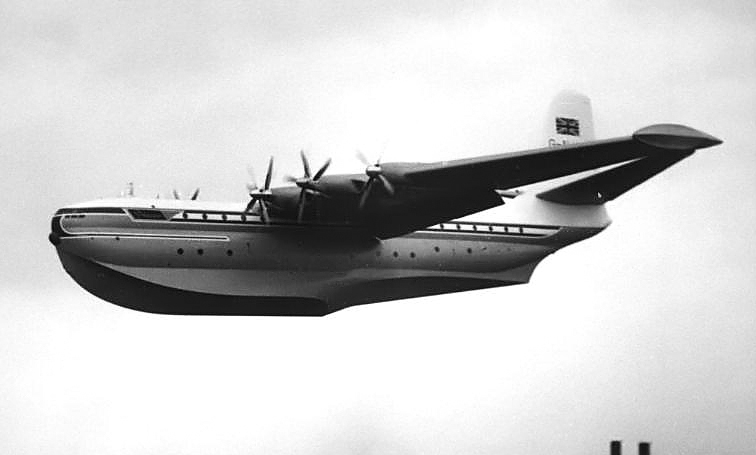
- Saunders-Roe Princess G-ALUN displaying at the Farnborough SBAC Show in September 1953

General information
- Type: Flying boat airliner
- Manufacturer: Saunders-Roe
- Number built: 1 (2 additional airframes cancelled mid-build)

History
- First flight: 22 August 1952

The Saunders-Roe SR.45 Princess was a British flying boat aircraft developed and built by Saunders-Roe at their Cowes facility on the Isle of Wight. It is the largest all-metal flying boat to have ever been constructed.

The Princess had been developed to serve as a larger and more luxurious successor to the prewar commercial flying boats, such as the Short Empire. It was intended to serve the transatlantic route, carrying up to 100 passengers between Southampton, United Kingdom and New York City, United States, in spacious and comfortable conditions. To achieve this, designers decided early on to make use of newly developed turboprop technology, opting for the Bristol Proteus engine still in development to power the aircraft. The project suffered delays due to difficulties encountered in the development of the Proteus engine.

On 22 August 1952, the first prototype Princess, G-ALUN, conducted its maiden flight. Between 1952 and 1954, the first prototype performed a total of 47 test flights, including two public appearances at the Farnborough Airshow. This work was carried out under a development contract for the Ministry of Supply, the intention being that this would lead to a contract for the aircraft from British flag carrier British Overseas Airways Corporation (BOAC). Although the initial development contract had been successfully met, BOAC eventually decided to focus on its land-based routes using the jet-powered De Havilland Comet, instead. The era of the large flying boat had effectively ended prior to the aircraft's completion.

Work on the Princess was ultimately cancelled after having produced three examples, only one of which flew. By the mid-1950s, large commercial flying boats were being increasingly overshadowed by land-based jet airliners. Factors such as runway and airport improvements had added to the viability of land-based aircraft, which did not have to compromise to accommodate the additional weight and drag of the boat hulls that were necessary on seaplanes, or the mitigating measures needed against the corrosion caused by seawater. Following the project's termination, the three airframes were stored with the intention of selling them on, but upon receipt of a promising offer for the aircraft, corrosion was found to have set in while in storage. As a result, all three aircraft prototypes were scrapped.

== Development ==
=== Origins ===
Before the Second World War, British airline Imperial Airways had successfully used large, long-range passenger flying boats such as the Short Empire and Short S.26 to build up a network of long-distance routes. These flying boats had not only pioneered new aerial routes across the British Empire which had previously not been served at all, but also passengers were transported within an unprecedented level of comfort, being provided with luxurious first-class accommodation, including a promenade, sizable galley, separate bathrooms for men and women, and individual cabins for passengers. However, operations of these flying boats had been disrupted by wartime, during which Imperial Airways had also merged with British Airways Ltd to form British Overseas Airways Corporation (BOAC) in 1940. While restricted operations of commercial flying boats did continue, such as the use of Boeing 314s for the transatlantic route, many were requisitioned for service with the Royal Air Force (RAF), where they were typically used as maritime patrol aircraft.

During the prewar era, flying boats had been preferred for conducting long-distance flights, as unlike their land-based counterparts, they were not limited by available runway length – the majority of which were still grass-surfaced at this point – and as a long-range aeroplane would be required to carry a large load of fuel, a larger size of the aircraft could be permitted without needing to cater for factors such as limited runway and airfield sizes. In addition, for services to far-flung parts of the British Empire, the ability to land and takeoff from any available area of water was a distinct advantage for services to such places, many of which at the time had no airport facilities at all. With the end of the Second World War, flying boats services were resumed, with other types being operated, such as the Short Hythe, Short Sandringham, and Short Solent. However, the war had also produced a legacy of large runways and sizable airports formerly used for military purposes that could now meet the needs of a larger generation of land aircraft.

Even prior to the war's end, the British Air Ministry was enthusiastic on the prospects for reviving the shuttered flying-boat routes. The ministry approached two British flying boat manufacturers – Saunders-Roe (Saro) and Short – requesting that the two firms collaborate on the development and manufacture of a new aircraft, which would emerge as the Short Shetland. As such, Saunders-Roe designed the Shetland and manufactured the wing, while Short produced the remainder of the aircraft. While two examples of the Shetland were completed, the project was considered a failure and the two flying boats were scrapped in 1951. Saunders-Roe considered the Shetland to have not resembled the flying boat that they sought to develop, but was otherwise a useful learning experience; even prior to the Shetland, the company had wanted to develop a more revolutionary flying boat.

During 1943, the chief designers of Saunders-Roe and Short had collaborated to produce a preliminary design specification for an innovative, large flying boat. This design specification defined various criteria for the proposed aircraft, which would be the largest all-metal flying boat ever built; performance criteria included a weight of 140 tons, a pressurised "double-bubble" hull, a 214-foot wingspan, a height of 55 feet 9 inches, and a length of 148 feet. The proposed aircraft would be capable of a cruising speed of 340 mph at an altitude of 37,000 feet, a range (dependent on payload) of 5,190–3,640 miles, and be outfitted with luxurious accommodation for a total of 104 passengers.

=== Selection and delays ===
During 1945, in response to an approach made by the British Ministry of Supply, which had been seeking design submissions from aviation companies for an envisioned new long-range civil flying boat, which was to operate in BOAC's fleet to operate its transatlantic passenger services, Saunders-Roe decided to submit a bid based upon the earlier collaborative design specification. Following evaluations of a range of different propulsion methods and configurations, the design team selected the undeveloped Bristol Proteus – one of the first turboprop engines – to meet the enormous power requirements of the proposed giant flying boat. In May 1946, the bid made by Saunders-Roe was selected as the winner, leading to the company receiving an order for the production of three SR.45 flying boats.

Work on the SR.45 commenced almost immediately upon receipt of the order. From an early stage in development, progress on the programme was subject to schedule overruns and higher-than-projected costs being incurred, leading to skepticism of the flying boat's viability within the House of Commons, which was being increasingly regarded as a high-risk initiative with unreliable costing. Specifically, designing and testing of the airframe, as well as the independently conducted development of the Proteus engine to power the SR.45, had been major contributors to the higher-than-expected costs.

In 1951, BOAC re-evaluated its standing requirements, and determined that the airline presently had no need for the Princess, or any new large flying boat. The airline had already elected to terminate its existing flying boat services during 1950. In late 1951, construction of the three Princesses was announced to proceed with the intention of using them as transport aircraft in RAF service. As announced in March 1952, though, while the first prototype would be completed, the second and third would be suspended to await more powerful engines.

=== Flight testing ===
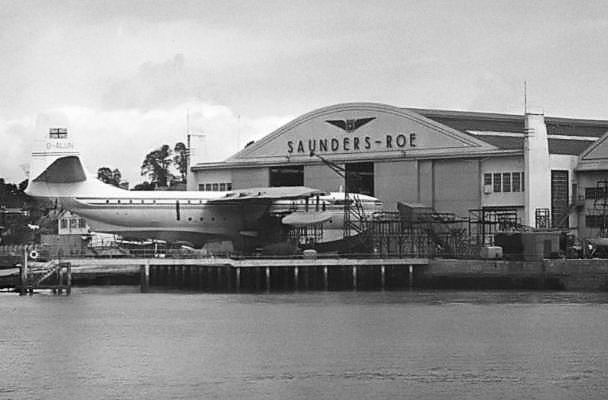
Saro Princess G-ALUN at the East Cowes works in September 1954

On 22 August 1952, the prototype, G-ALUN, conducted its maiden flight, piloted by Geoffrey Tyson. The initial flight lasted for 35 minutes, in which the flying boat performed a complete circumnavigation of the Isle of Wight. According to aviation author Phillip Kaplan, the Princess had not been intended to fly that day at all, and only taxiing tests had been scheduled to take place, but Tyson had decided to proceed due to the excellent conditions present on the day. The prototype was quickly put through several test flights with the hope of being able to sufficiently ready the flying boat to appear at the 1952 Farnborough Airshow, but indications of engine reliability issues were encountered and this led to the intended flight display at Farnborough that year being abandoned.

As further testing of the prototype continued, the reliability of the engines and gearboxes continued to be problematic, but not to the extent that flight testing was prevented. Evaluation of the flying boat continued into 1953, during which particular attention was devoted towards addressing the difficulties uncovered. During the 1953 Farnborough Airshow, the prototype was displayed. Flight tests of the prototype continued until 27 May 1954, by which point the Proteus engine, once perfected, was found to be incapable of enabling the type to achieve its envisioned performance figures. G-ALUN was the only model to fly, performing 46 test flights in total during which 100 hours flight hours were accumulated.

Princess Air Transport Co Ltd was formed with the object of studying the factors affecting the operation of the Princess flying boats and to tender for their operation should the opportunity have arisen. The company's directors were M D N Wyatt (chairman), Sir Archibald Philip Hope, 17th Baronet, Geoffrey Tyson, P D Irons, and Capt H W C Alger (general manager). About 75% of the share capital was held by Saunders-Roe Ltd and the balance by Airwork Ltd.

=== Termination of production ===
Following the completion of flying tests performed by the prototype, the British government exercised considerable indecision over the fate of the programme. In addition to the prototype, a further two Princesses (G-ALUO and G-ALUP) were under construction, but these would never fly. While a decision from the government was pending, the three aircraft were placed into storage, being cocooned and retained, one at Cowes and two at Calshot Spit; work on the programme hopefully would be restarted when a buyer was found.

=== Proposals for reuse ===
Over the ensuing years, several offers were issued with the intention of purchasing the Princesses, including two proposals which would have involved re-engining them with Rolls-Royce Tynes. In 1954, Aquila Airways had offered £1 million each for the stored Princesses, but this offer was rejected. In 1957, Saro itself had proposed the conversion of the aircraft to serve as landplane troop carriers/freighters.

In 1958, information on the Princess was shared with the United States Navy, which was at the time examining the possibility of converting the three stored aircraft to make use of nuclear power. This interest resulted in a delegation from Saro being dispatched to the US to discuss a sale of the preserved Princesses, but this interest ultimately amounted to nothing.

In 1964, the three Princesses were all purchased by Eoin Mekie on behalf of Aero Spacelines, which planned to use them as heavy-duty freight aircraft for transporting Saturn V rocket components for NASA. When the cocooning was removed, they were found to be badly corroded (the contract for maintenance and inspection of the stored aircraft had been allowed to lapse, which resulted in the airframes deteriorating rapidly), and all three Princesses were broken up by 1967.

In the wake of the success of his Pregnant Guppy, constructor Jack Conroy discussed his concepts for other outsize transports with Air Progress in their publication, World's Greatest Aircraft (Petersen Publications, 1973). Conroy considered the creation of an outsize transport from the Princess to have been basically feasible, in that it shares a sectional double-bubble fuselage construction similar to that of the Boeing 377 Stratocruiser, on which the Guppies were based. The reason for considering producing such an aircraft was the desire of NASA to possess a means of transporting the first stage of the Saturn V rocket by air, if this were possible, to Cape Canaveral; the ability for the aircraft to conduct a water landing would also be advantageous for proximity landing at sea, or on nearby lakes in Florida. Ultimately, this plan was deemed to be impractical, though the existing Guppies continued to function throughout the Apollo program as efficient air transport of the outsize hardware used in these missions. Conroy quipped that the British were "offended when we named our aircraft 'The Pregnant Guppy'. Man, can you imagine what they would have said if we produced 'The Pregnant Princess' !"

They were the last fixed-wing commercial aircraft produced by Saunders-Roe. The company constructed one more fixed-wing design, the Saunders-Roe SR.53 mixed-power (rocket and turbojet) fighter design; aside from that venture, the company primarily concentrated its efforts on helicopters and hovercraft after this point.

== Design ==
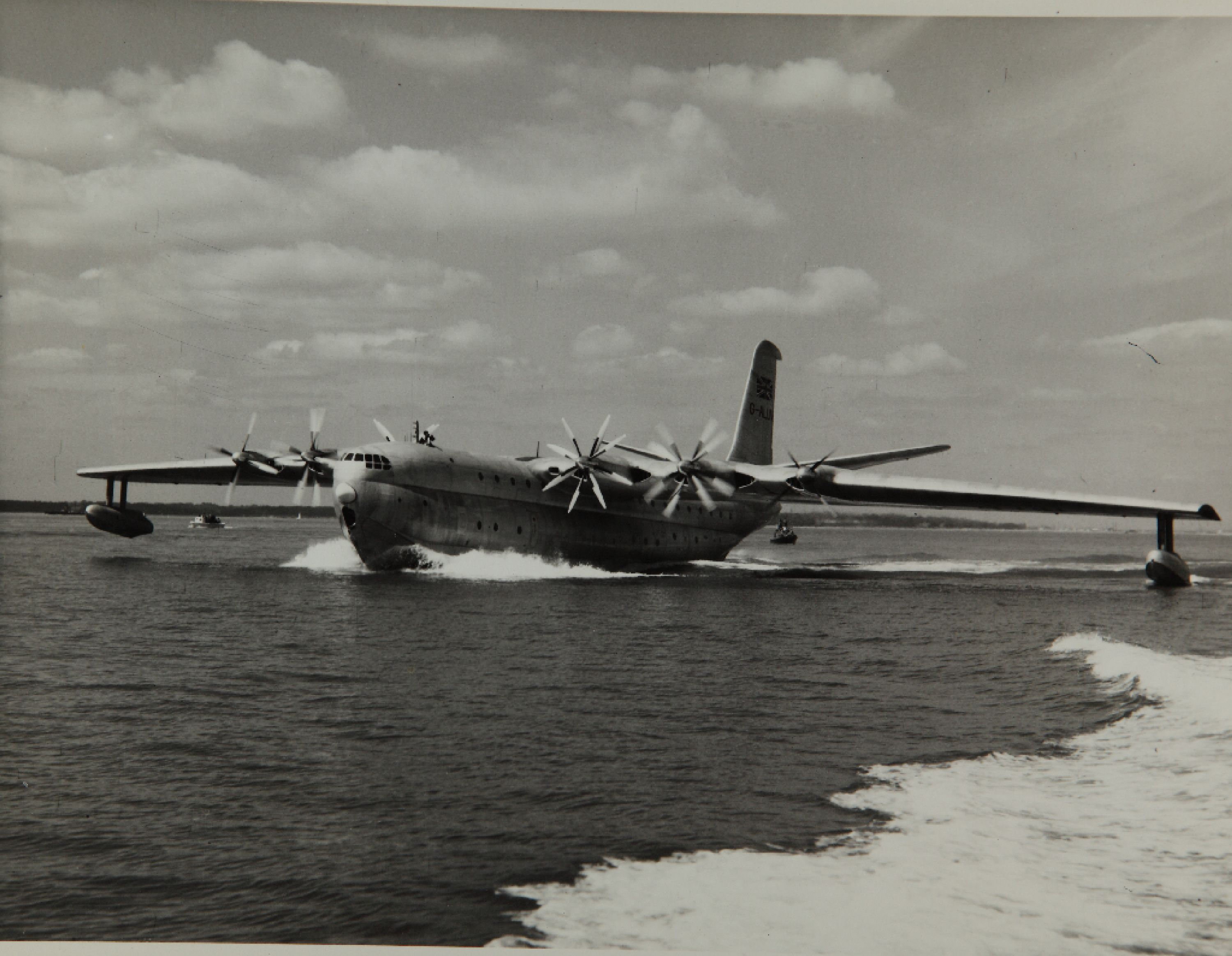
A Saunders-Roe SR.45 Princess during a taxiing run

The SR.45 Princess was a large flying boat, being the largest all-metal flying boat to have ever been constructed. The Princess featured a rounded, bulbous, "double-bubble" pressurized fuselage, which contained two full passenger decks; these decks had sufficient room to accommodate up to 105 passengers in great comfort. The planing bottom of the hull had only a slight step in the keel to minimize drag in the air. The Princess was powered by an arrangement of ten Bristol Proteus turboprop engines. These engines drove six sets of four-bladed propellers; of these, the inner four propellers were double, contra-rotating propellers, which were driven by a twin version of the Proteus, named the Bristol Coupled Proteus; each engine drove one of the propellers. The two outer propellers were single and each powered by a single engine.

The cockpit of the Princess was designed to be operated by two pilots, two flight engineers, a navigator, and a radio operator. Early on, the aircraft was intended to be outfitted with some form of powered flight controls, including an early fly-by-wire implementation, so pilots would be able to effectively actuate its large control surfaces, which would have to overcome equally larger forces. Designers instead decided to opt for a traditional mechanical-linkage approach that was augmented by a series of electrically driven power-assist units to effectively support actuation.

The ailerons and rudder were split into multiple sections so if a part of the servo-powered control system were to fail, a faulty section could be "trailed" so that it did not act against the remaining working sections. While the prototype aircraft had been fitted with advanced (but conventional) hydraulic controls, Saunders-Roe had intended production aircraft to use an analogue system featuring electrical servos with hydraulic final-control actuators. Such a system had been built and undergone ground testing, but the Princess had been terminated prior to any aircraft having been fitted with the system.

== Specifications ==
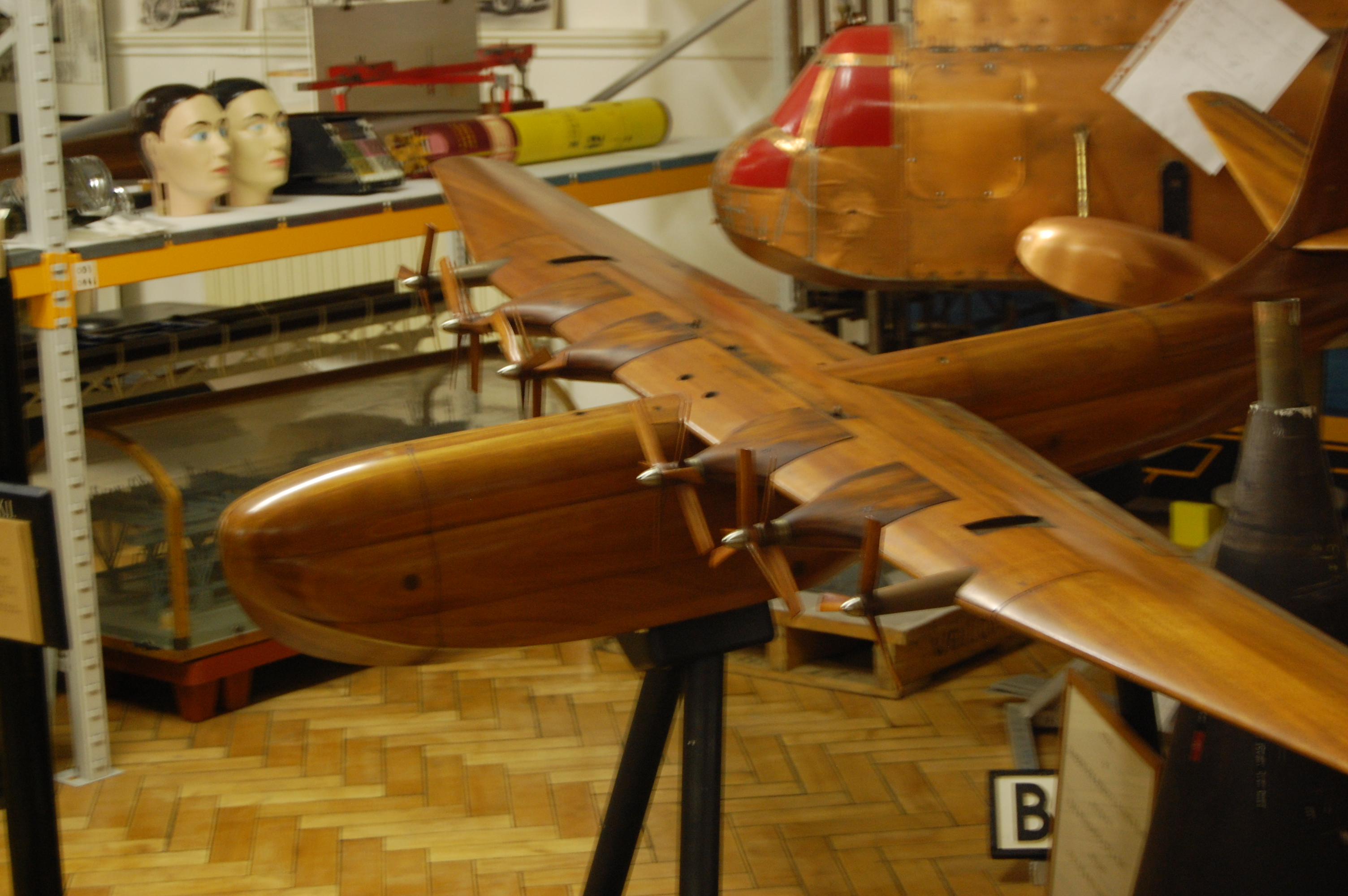
Wooden model of the SR.45 Princess used for wind tunnel testing

Data from Saunders and Saro Aircraft since 1917 British Flying Boats and Flight 1952

General characteristics

- Crew: 2 pilots, 2 flight engineers, radio operator and navigator
- Capacity: 105 passengers in tourist and first class cabins / 137,000 lb (62,142.2 kg) disposable load
- Length: 148 ft (45 m)
- Wingspan: 219 ft 6 in (66.90 m) with wingtip floats retracted. 209 ft 6 in (63.86 m) floats extended.
- Height: 55 ft 9 in (16.99 m)
- Wing area: 5,019 sq ft (466.3 m^{2})
- Airfoil: "Saro-modified Goldstein section" to "modified N.A.C.A. 4415 Series" at tip
- Empty weight: 190,000 lb (86,183 kg)
- Gross weight: 330,000 lb (149,685 kg)
- Max takeoff weight: 345,025 lb (156,501 kg)
- Fuel capacity: 14,000 imp gal (63,645.3 L; 16,813.3 US gal) in four integral inner wing tanks.
- Powerplant: 4 × Bristol Coupled-Proteus 610 (Note: each two Proteus engines feeding a common gearbox and contra-rotating propellers) turboprop, 5,000 hp (3,700 kW) each + 1,660 lbf (7.38 kN) residual thrust at 10,000 rpm at sea level (Note: Maximum continuous power of a Proteus was 2,050 hp (1,529 kW) + 700 lbf (3.11 kN) residual thrust at 9,500 rpm at sea level.)
- Powerplant: 2 × Bristol Proteus 620 Turboprop engines, 2,500 hp (1,900 kW) each + 820 lbf (3.65 kN) residual thrust at 10,000 rpm
- Propellers: 4-bladed de Havilland constant speed, quick-feathering Duralumin propellers., 16 ft 6 in (5.03 m) diameter

Performance

- Maximum speed: 380 mph (610 km/h, 330 kn) at 37,000 ft (11,000 m)
- Cruise speed: 360 mph (580 km/h, 310 kn) at 32,500 ft (9,900 m)
- Stall speed: 113 mph (181 km/h, 98 kn) flaps and floats down
- Range: 5,720 mi (9,210 km, 4,970 nmi)
- Endurance: 15 hours
- Service ceiling: 39,000 ft (12,000 m) absolute
- Rate of climb: 1,900 ft/min (9.7 m/s) at 184 mph (296 km/h; 160 kn) at sea level

== See also ==
Related development

- Saunders-Roe Duchess project – British design for a large jet-powered flying boat

Aircraft of comparable role, configuration, and era

- Bristol Brabazon – British propeller-driven large airliner prototype

Related lists

- List of flying boats and floatplanes
