= John Lankester Parker =

Chief Test Pilot for short Brothers

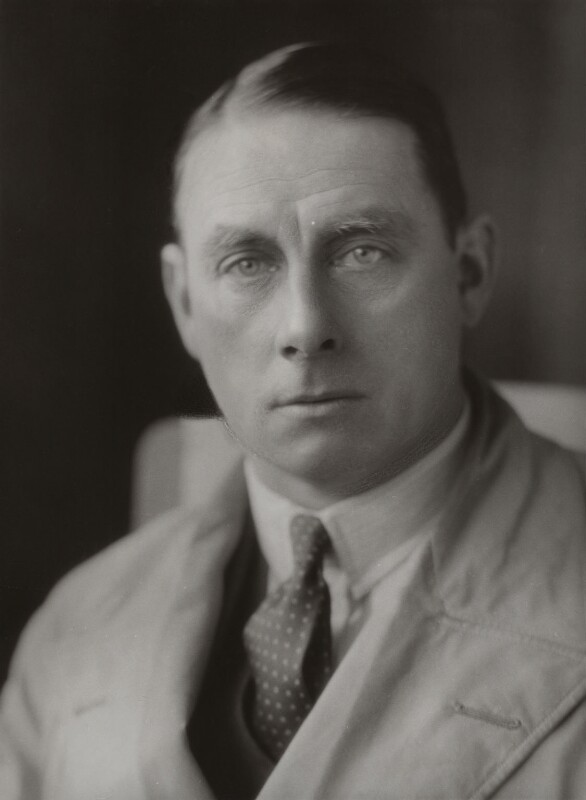
Parker in 1938

John Lankester Parker OBE FRAeS Hon. MSLAE (1896 – 22 August 1965) was Chief Test Pilot for Short Brothers from 1918 until his retirement in 1945. He joined Shorts in 1916 as a part-time test pilot and assistant to then Chief Test Pilot Ronald Kemp, having been recommended for the post by Captain, later Admiral Sir, Murray Sueter, RNAS. By the time he retired he was a director of the company.

== First flying experience ==
He gained his first flying experience as a pilot and instructor flying for the Northern Aircraft Company's Seaplane School based in Windermere, where he flew, first as a pupil and then as an instructor, between 1914 and 1916. It was during this time that he made the acquaintance of Murray Sueter, Ronald Kemp and Oscar Gnosspelius, all of whom would figure later in his work at Shorts.

In 1916, he joined the Prodger-Isaacs Syndicate of freelance test pilots, working for several British aircraft manufacturers.

== Shorts ==
His first assignment with Shorts began on 17 October 1916, when he was asked by Horace Short to test fly a batch of six Short Bombers from the Eastchurch airfield. In spite of his relative youth, his flying skills impressed Horace Short, who soon offered him a permanent position as assistant to Ronald Kemp.

He became Chief Test Pilot for Short Brothers in 1918 as successor to Ronald Kemp. Between 1918 and his last official flight as Chief Test Pilot on 22 August 1945 he flew every Shorts prototype on its maiden flight, ranging from the diminutive Short Satellite (640 lb (290 kg)) to the very large Short Shetland (75,860 lb (34,410 kg)). During the course of his long association with the company, especially during the early pioneering years, he survived numerous forced landings, both on land and on water.

He was awarded the OBE in June 1942.

In 1943 he became a Director of Short Brothers and Harland Ltd., Belfast, resigning from the Board in 1958.

== Other activities ==
Parker was a long-time member of the Guild of Air Pilots and Air Navigators, serving as its Master from 1951 until 1953 and again from 1956 until 1957. In 1948 he was the first recipient of the Guild's Brackley Memorial Trophy, "awarded to a transport pilot(s) or navigator(s), for outstanding flying, contributing to the operational development of air transport, or transport aircraft, or of new techniques in air transport flying."

In 1964 he succeeded Lord Douglas of Kirtleside as President of the Seaplane Club of Great Britain.

In memory of his long association with the Medway area, a road in Rochester, Kent was named after him.
