= Saunders Medina =

British flying boat built in 1926

A.4 Medina
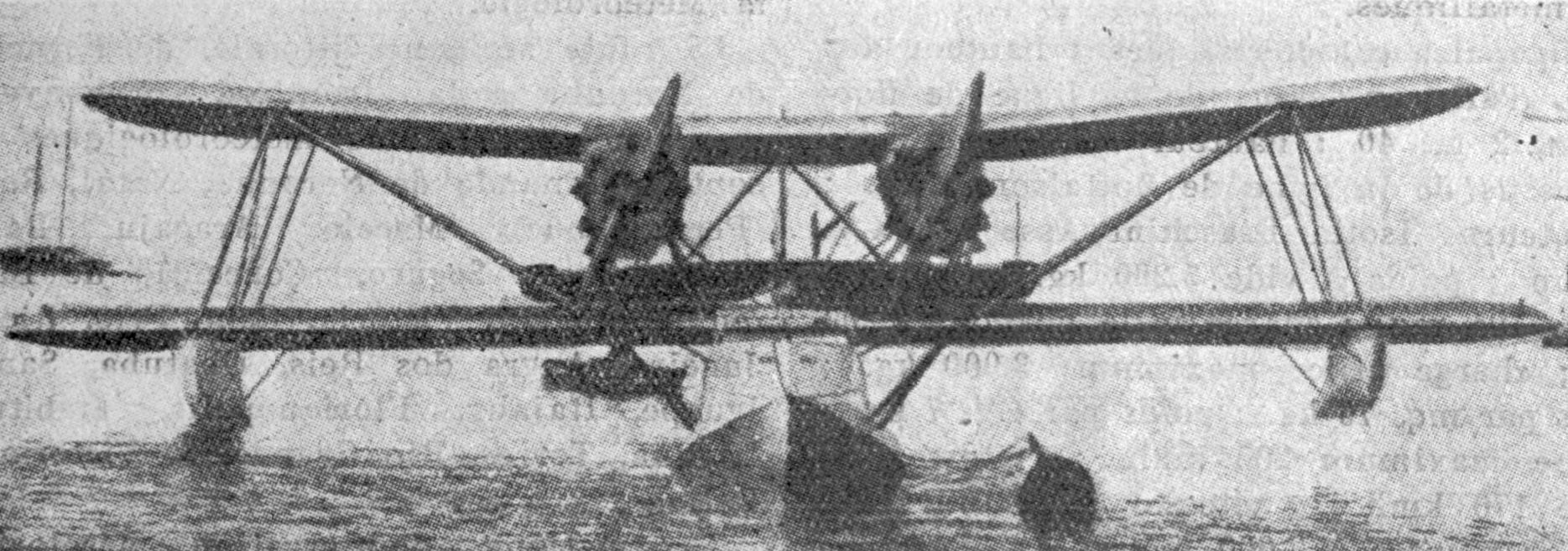

General information
- Type: Ten-passenger flying boat
- National origin: United Kingdom
- Manufacturer: S. E. Saunders Limited
- Status: Withdrawn from use
- Number built: 1

History
- First flight: November 1926
- Retired: Scrapped 1929

The Saunders A.4 Medina was a British flying boat built by S.E. Saunders at East Cowes, Isle of Wight.

== Development ==
The Medina was built for the Air Council between 1925 and 1926 and was a plywood-covered wooden flying boat powered by two 450 hp Bristol Jupiter VI radial engines mounted onto and slung from the top wings. The upper wing was slightly smaller than the lower wing, braced with Warren truss-type interplane struts. It had a crew of two and room for ten passengers. Only one Medina was built, registered G-EBMG, first flying in November 1926. It proved disappointing, having poor water handling, with its hull being prone to leaks. It was withdrawn from use and scrapped in 1929.

== Specifications ==
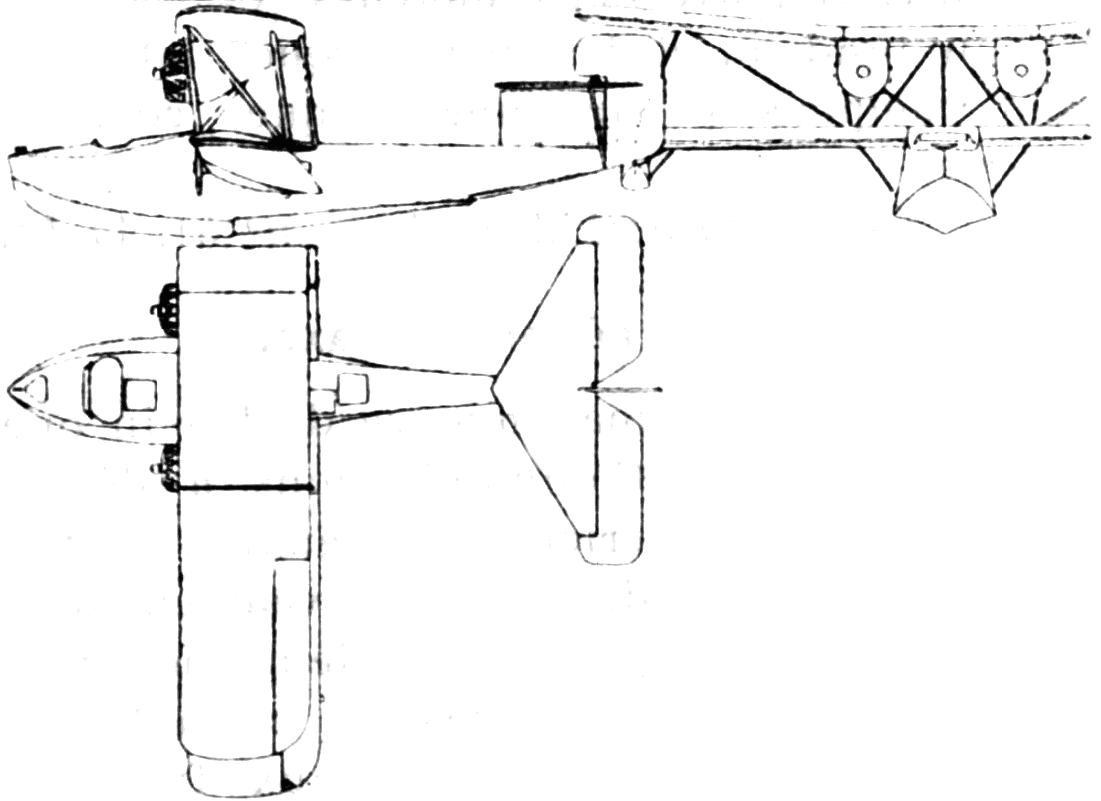
Saunders A.4 Medina 3-view drawing from Le Document aéronautique January,1927

Data from

General characteristics

- Crew: two
- Capacity: ten passengers
- Length: 49 ft 0 in (14.94 m)
- Wingspan: 58 ft 0 in (17.68 m)
- Height: 16 ft 0 in (4.88 m)
- Wing area: 1,007 sq ft (93.6 m^{2})
- Empty weight: 8,060 lb (3,656 kg)
- Gross weight: 11,560 lb (5,244 kg)
- Powerplant: 2 × Bristol Jupiter VI , 450 hp (336 kW) each

Performance

- Maximum speed: 115 mph (184 km/h, 100 kn)
- Cruise speed: 90 mph (145 km/h, 78 kn)
- Range: 360 mi (580 km, 310 nmi)
- Endurance: 4 hours

== See also ==
Related lists

- List of flying boats and floatplanes
