= Sunbeam Nubian =

1910s British piston aircraft engine

Nubian
- Type: V-8, 90 degree, water-cooled, piston engine
- National origin: United Kingdom
- Manufacturer: Sunbeam
- Designer: Louis Coatalen
- First run: 1916
- Major applications: Saunders T.1
- Manufactured: 1916-1917
- Number built: 36

The Sunbeam Nubian, also called the Sunbeam 155 hp, was a British 8-cylinder aero-engine that was first run in 1916.

== Design and development ==
In March 1916 Louis Coatalen, the chief designer at Sunbeam, responded to the Admiralty's request for more powerful engines by designing the V-8 Nubian. The Nubian featured the twin overhead camshafts and four valves of his prewar engines for Grand Prix and TT racing cars. With a bore of 95 mm (4 in) and stroke of 135 mm (5 in) the Nubian displaced 7.685 L (469 cu in) and was rated at 155 hp (116 kW) with a reduction gear ratio of 0.615:1.

The original engine was built with a 60-degree angle between cylinder banks, but severe vibration problems forced Coatalen to redesign it with a 90-degree angle, emerging as the Nubian II. Intended to power the Supermarine AD Flying Boat, the teething troubles of the Nubian forced Supermarine to use a 150 hp (112 kW) Hispano-Suiza V-8 engine instead.

Deliveries of the Nubian II began in October 1917, by which time the Nubian was overshadowed by the more powerful V-8s from Hispano-Suiza and the 200 hp (149 kW) Sunbeam Arab. The only aircraft known to have been powered by a Nubian was the Saunders T.1, but some of the 36 engines built, of 50 ordered, are believed to have been supplied to the Imperial Russian Air Service.

The Nubian suffered from a poor design decision at first and was overtaken by events which prevented widespread use, but its cousin, the V-12 Sunbeam Afridi and its family members found greater success.

== Variants ==
Sunbeam Nubian
The initial V-8 engine with 60 degree V and rated at 155 hp (116 kW).
Sunbeam Nubian II
Redesigned with 90 degree cylinder angle to alleviate severe vibration problems, the Nubian II was late in delivery and was not widely used.

== Applications ==
- Saunders T.1
- Blackburn GP - handed left and right

== Specifications (Nubian II) ==
Data from Sunbeam Aero-Engines

=== General characteristics ===
- Type: V-8 90 degree V, water-cooled piston engine
- Bore: 95 mm (4 in)
- Stroke: 135 mm (5 in)
- Displacement: 7.685 L (469 cu in)
- Length: 1,052 mm (41 in)
- Height: 765 mm (30 in)
- Dry weight: 310 kg (683 lb)
- Designer: Louis Coatalen

=== Components ===
- Valvetrain: Twin direct overhead camshaft, two exhaust and two inlet valves per cylinder
- Fuel system: gravity fed
- Fuel type: Petrol
- Oil system: Dry sump, pressure fed
- Cooling system: Water-cooled by radiator
- Reduction gear: 0.615:1

=== Performance ===
- Power output: 115.6 kW (155 hp)

== See also ==
Comparable engines

- Sunbeam Arab
- Sunbeam Crusader
- Hispano-Suiza 8

Related lists

- List of aircraft engines
