= Saunders T.1 =

T.1

General information
- Type: Military
- National origin: United Kingdom
- Manufacturer: S. E. Saunders Ltd.
- Designer: Henry Haberfield Thomas
- Number built: 1

History
- First flight: 1917

The Saunders T.1 was the first aircraft built by the Saunders Company, a two-seat single-engined biplane with unusual monocoque fuselage construction. Only one was built.

== Development ==
Before World War I, the Cowes-based firm of S.E. Saunders Ltd was well known for its motor boats and in particular for Sam Saunder's patented method of jointing plywood structures for marine environments. In the absence of waterproof glues, Saunders sewed sheets together with copper wire, a method known by the trade name Consuta. Consuta-built hulls were produced by Saunders for several flying boats between 1912 and 1915, but most of the company's war time was spent building other companies' designs. The T.1 (T for Henry Haberfield Thomas, its designer) was the first all-Saunders aircraft, appearing in 1917.

It was a single-engined two-seat biplane with single bay wings. These were unswept, carried no stagger and had parallel chord apart from the tips; notable was the large interplane gap and the large (6 ft 4 in, 1.93 m) overhang of the upper wing, wire braced from upward extensions of the interplane struts. It had unbalanced ailerons on the upper wing only. The most unusual feature of the aircraft, though no surprise given Saunders' previous experience was the fuselage, a wooden frame with Consuta-fastened plywood panels, one of the earliest monocoque aircraft structures. This carried a conventional tail, with an unbraced tailplane and fin bearing unbalanced control surfaces. The pilot's cockpit was below the wing trailing edge with a pair of inboard cut-aways in the trailing edge of the lower wing to improved downward visibility. He controlled a synchronised forward firing Lewis gun and the observer, sitting behind in a separate cockpit, operated a Lewis gun mounted on a Scarff ring. Dual controls were fitted.

The T.1 was originally intended to be powered by a 200 hp (150 kW) Hispano-Suiza engine, but all of these were prioritised for S.E.5as and instead a water-cooled 150 hp (112 kW) Sunbeam Nubian was installed, with a radiator immediately behind the four-bladed propeller. Initially the single exhaust pipe went up from the nose at an angle of about 30° to the vertical, though this was replaced by a more conventional arrangement later.

The T.1 first flew in 1917 and seems to have flown quite well, the only reported problem being a tendency to engine overheating. Only one was built though and its intended role is not clear; development ended when its designer, H.H. Thomas, died in the 1918–19 influenza epidemic.

== Specifications ==
Data from London 1988, pp. 53–54

General characteristics

- Crew: Two
- Length: 23 ft 8 in (7.21 m)
- Upper wingspan: 37 ft 5 in (11.40 m)
- Lower wingspan: 24 ft 9 in (7.54 m)
- Height: 11 ft 3 1/4 in (3.435 m)
- Wing area: 335 sq ft (31.1 m^{2})
- Empty weight: 1,795 lb (814 kg)
- Gross weight: 2,680 lb (1,216 kg)
- Powerplant: 1 × Sunbeam Nubian water-cooled V8 engine, 150 hp (110 kW)

Performance

- Maximum speed: 89 mph (143 km/h, 77 kn)
- Cruise speed: 74 mph (119 km/h, 64 kn)
- Endurance: 3 hr
- Service ceiling: 11,000 ft (3,400 m)

Armament

- Guns:
  - 1× 0.303 in (7.7 mm) Lewis gun synchronised to fire forward through propeller
  - 1× 0.303 in (7.7 mm) Lewis gun in observer's cockpit
