= Consuta =

Form of construction of watertight hulls

Sopwith Bat Boat

Consuta was a form of construction of watertight hulls for boats and marine aircraft, comprising four veneers of mahogany planking interleaved with waterproofed calico and stitched together with copper wire. The name is from the Latin for "sewn together".

The technique was patented by Sam Saunders of Goring-on-Thames and was first used on the 1898 umpire's steam launch of the same name. Having been restored, the steam launch Consuta was returned to service on the River Thames on 15 October 2001.

After opening the S. E. Saunders boatyard at East Cowes on the Isle of Wight, the technique was further used to build the crew and engine gondolas for HMA1 Mayfly, Britain's first airship. Later, the same technique was used to construct the hull of the Sopwith Bat Boat, the early flying boat that won the Mortimer Singer prize.

The technique remained in use until waterproof glues became available in the 1950s.
