= Armstrong Siddeley ASX =

1940s British turbojet aircraft engine

ASX
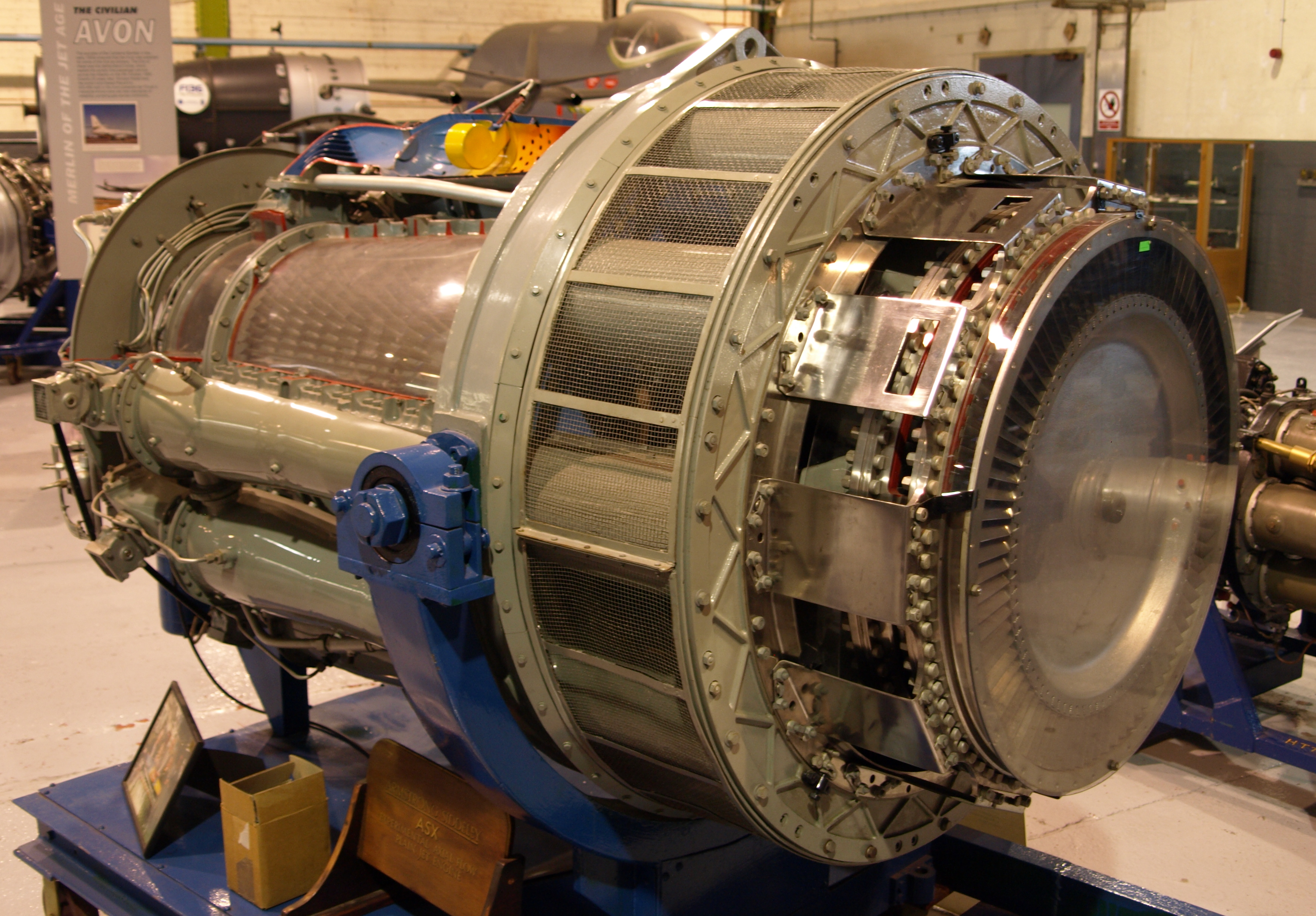
- Armstrong Siddeley ASX turbojet on display at the Rolls-Royce Heritage Trust, Derby
- Type: Experimental turbojet
- National origin: United Kingdom
- Manufacturer: Armstrong Siddeley
- First run: April 1943
- Major applications: Avro Lancaster (test bed only)
- Developed into: Armstrong Siddeley Python

The Armstrong Siddeley ASX was an early axial flow jet engine built by Armstrong Siddeley that first ran in April 1943. Only a single prototype was constructed, and it was never put into production. A turboprop version as the ASP was somewhat more successful, and as the Armstrong Siddeley Python saw use in the Westland Wyvern.

== History ==
In December 1941, Metrovick ran its Metrovick F.2 engine for the first time. While successful, the engine was too heavy to be a useful aircraft engine, and the Royal Aircraft Establishment (RAE) felt this was probably due to Metrovick's history as a steam turbine manufacturer without much aircraft experience. The RAE approached Armstrong Siddeley with an offer to help with the design, both to improve the F.2 and to get the company familiar with turbojet design so they might build their own designs, or others under license. However, Metrovick refused the offer, and no amount of effort on the part of Armstrong Siddeley or the RAE would change their opinion.

Now highly interested in jet propulsion, Armstrong Siddeley began looking for other designs they could work on, and eventually hired Fritz Albert Max Hepner. Hepner had a design similar to the early designs of A. A. Griffith, in that the engine did not use separate compressor and turbine stages, but combined the two by attaching an individual turbine stage to each compressor stage, and rotating each stage in opposite directions. The main difference between Hepner's design and Griffith's was that the stages were not connected to a central shaft, but instead to a surrounding rotating shell.

The RAE was not impressed with this design, and repeatedly refused to provide funding for its development, suggesting instead a much simpler design. Another major critic of the concept was Armstrong Siddeley's chief engineer, Stewart Tresilian, who had grudgingly taken the post in 1939 at the request of the RAE. The Armstrong Siddeley board fired Tresilian in January 1942 and submitting their latest design proposal; once again it was rejected.

It was not until August 1942 that the company was finally convinced to begin work on a simpler design. Like the F.2, the plan was to use the RAE's compressor designs while Armstrong Siddeley would develop the turbines and the rest of the engine. This new experimental design became the ASX. An order for six examples was placed in October 1942, and the contract signed on 7 November.

The engine ran for the first time on 22 April 1943, only 166 days after the contract was signed. The engine was soon producing 2,000 lbf. As soon as the Air Ministry was satisfied the company was able to make engines, they granted Armstrong Siddeley permission to make a Heppner-derived version. However, the company gave up on this as well, and decided to instead use the ASX as the basis for a turboprop, which became the ASP. Thus the first example of the ASX would ultimately be the last as well. Testing continued on the ASX through the rest of the war, and by 20 April 1945 it had run for a total of 22 hours.

Although A-S and Metrovick were not able to collaborate during the war, in the late 1940s the Ministry of Supply forced Metrovick to spin out their gas turbine division and handed it complete to Armstrong Siddeley in order to reduce the number of firms in the aviation business. So Armstrong Siddeley ultimately ended up with the F.2, and more importantly, the F.9 which would become the Armstrong Siddeley Sapphire.

== Design and development ==
The ASX was unique in layout. The inlet to the 14-stage compressor was placed near the middle of the engine, the air flowing forward as it was compressed. From there it fed into 11 flame cans arranged around the outside of the compressor, flowing back past the inlet, and finally through the turbine.

This layout allowed the compressor and combustion areas to be "folded" together to make the engine shorter, although the overall reduction in the case of the ASX appears to be fairly limited as the engine was almost 14 feet (4.3 m) long. Additionally, this layout makes it more difficult to service the compressor, although, at least in modern designs, it is the "hot section" that generally requires most servicing.

The ASX was flight tested fitted to the bomb bay of a modified Avro Lancaster, ND784, the first flight taking place on 28 September 1945.

At full power the engine ran at 8,000 rpm and developed 2,600 lbf (12 kN) of thrust at sea level. For cruise the engine ran at 7,500 rpm and developed 2,050 lbf (9.1 kN). It weighed 1,900 pounds (860 kg). The ASP conversion used a second turbine stage to drive the propeller through a gearbox, producing 3,600 shp, as well as 1,100 lbf (4.9 kN) of leftover jet thrust.

== Applications ==
- Avro Lancaster (Test only)

== Specifications (ASX) ==
Data from Aircraft Engines of the world 1946.

==== General characteristics ====
- Type: Axial flow turbojet
- Length: 167 in (424.2 cm)
- Diameter: 42 in (106.7 cm)
- Dry weight: 1,900 lb (860 kg)

==== Components ====
- Compressor: 14-stage axial reverse-flow compressor
- Combustors: 11 stainless steel can combustion chambers arranged around the compressor
- Turbine: 2-stage axial
- Fuel type: Kerosene
- Oil system: pressure feed to bearings, dry sump

==== Performance ====
- Maximum thrust: 2,600 lbf (12 kN) at 8,000 rpm at sea level
- Overall pressure ratio: 5:1
- Turbine inlet temperature: 1,220 °F (660 °C)
- Specific fuel consumption: 1.03 lb/(lbf h) (105 kg/(kN h))
- Thrust-to-weight ratio: 1.37
- Military thrust, static: 2,600 lbf (12 kN) at 8,000 rpm at sea level
- Cruising, static: 2,050 lbf (9 kN) at 7,500 rpm at sea level
- Idling, static: 130 lbf (1 kN) at 3,000 rpm at sea level

== See also ==
Related development

- Armstrong Siddeley Python

Related lists

- List of aircraft engines
