= Rolls-Royce Clyde =

1940s British turboprop aircraft engine

RB.39 Clyde
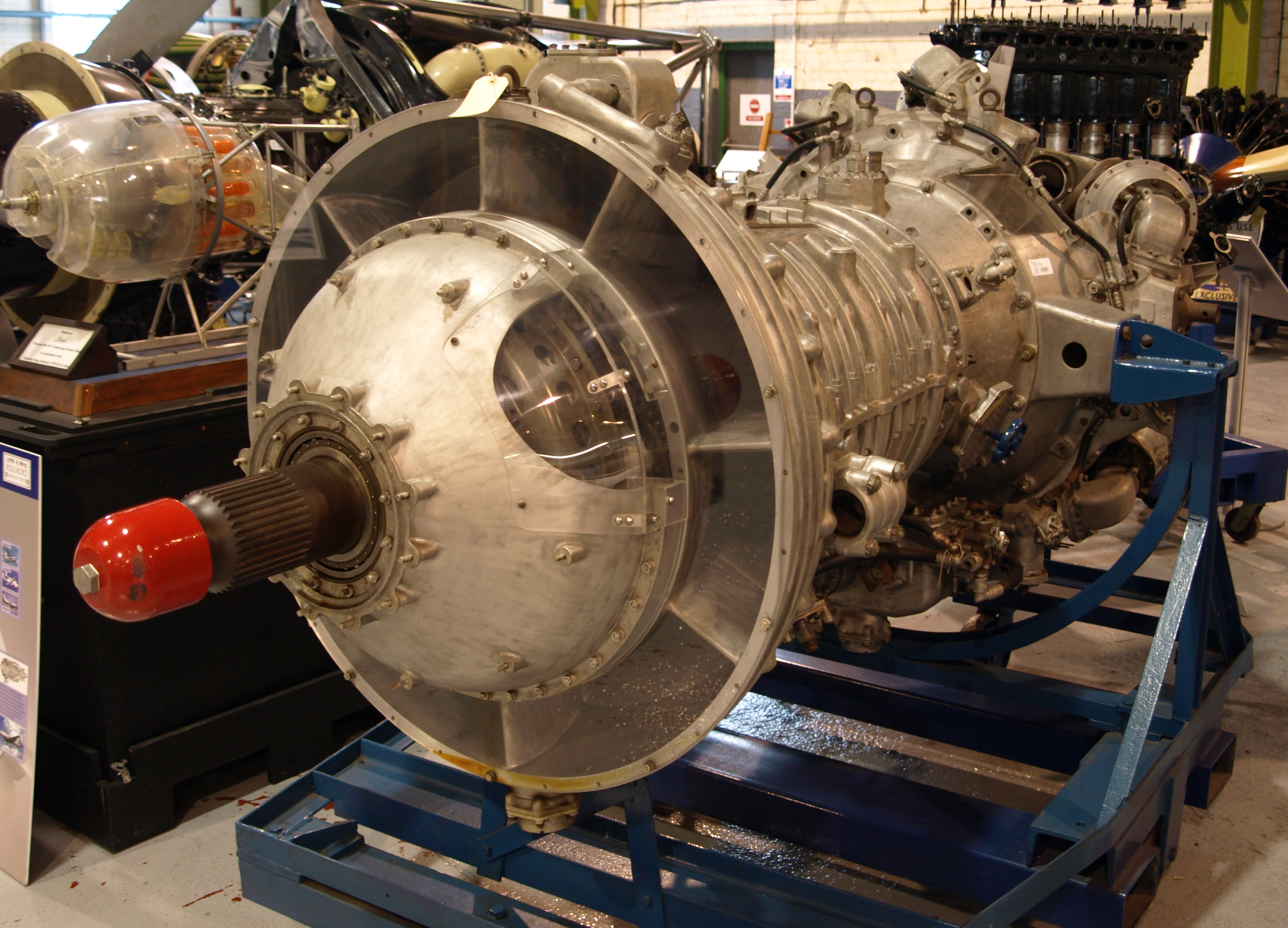
- Rolls-Royce Clyde on display at the Rolls-Royce Heritage Trust, Derby
- Type: Turboprop
- Manufacturer: Rolls-Royce Limited
- First run: 5 August 1945
- Number built: 9

The Rolls-Royce RB.39 Clyde was Rolls-Royce's first purpose-designed turboprop engine and the first turboprop engine to pass its civil and military type-tests.

As with subsequent Rolls-Royce gas turbines, it was named after a river, the River Clyde.

== Design and development ==
The Clyde used a two-shaft design, with an axial compressor based on that of the Metrovick F.2 for the low-pressure section, and a single-sided centrifugal compressor scaled up from the Merlin 46 supercharger as the high-pressure stage, both mounted on the HP shaft and driven by a single stage HP turbine. A single stage power turbine drove the front mounted propeller reduction gearbox via the concentric LP shaft. A fairly novel feature of this compact gearbox was the power output to contra-rotating propellers.

The Clyde was a long engine with the axial LP compressor in front of what was, in effect, a scaled-down Derwent engine. Accessories were grouped around the axial compressor which conveniently narrowed towards the rear. Cooling for turbines and turbine bearings came from a small impeller on the main shaft as well as air taken from the axial and centrifugal compressors. Testing of the development engines exceeded expectations with the engine soon being rated at 4,030 eshp. During testing potentially destructive vibrations were found originating in the straight-cut spur gears in the reduction gearbox.

The engine was selected as the main engine of the Westland Wyvern TF Mk.2 strike aircraft. However, despite the promising performance of the test engines Ernest Hives felt that pure-jets such as the Avon were the future and the Clyde programme was terminated, forcing Westland to use the less than satisfactory Armstrong Siddeley Python on the production Wyverns. and so Rolls-Royce's first production turboprop would be the Dart.

== Engines on display ==
A part sectioned example is on display at the Rolls-Royce Heritage Trust, (Derby).

== Specifications (Clyde) ==
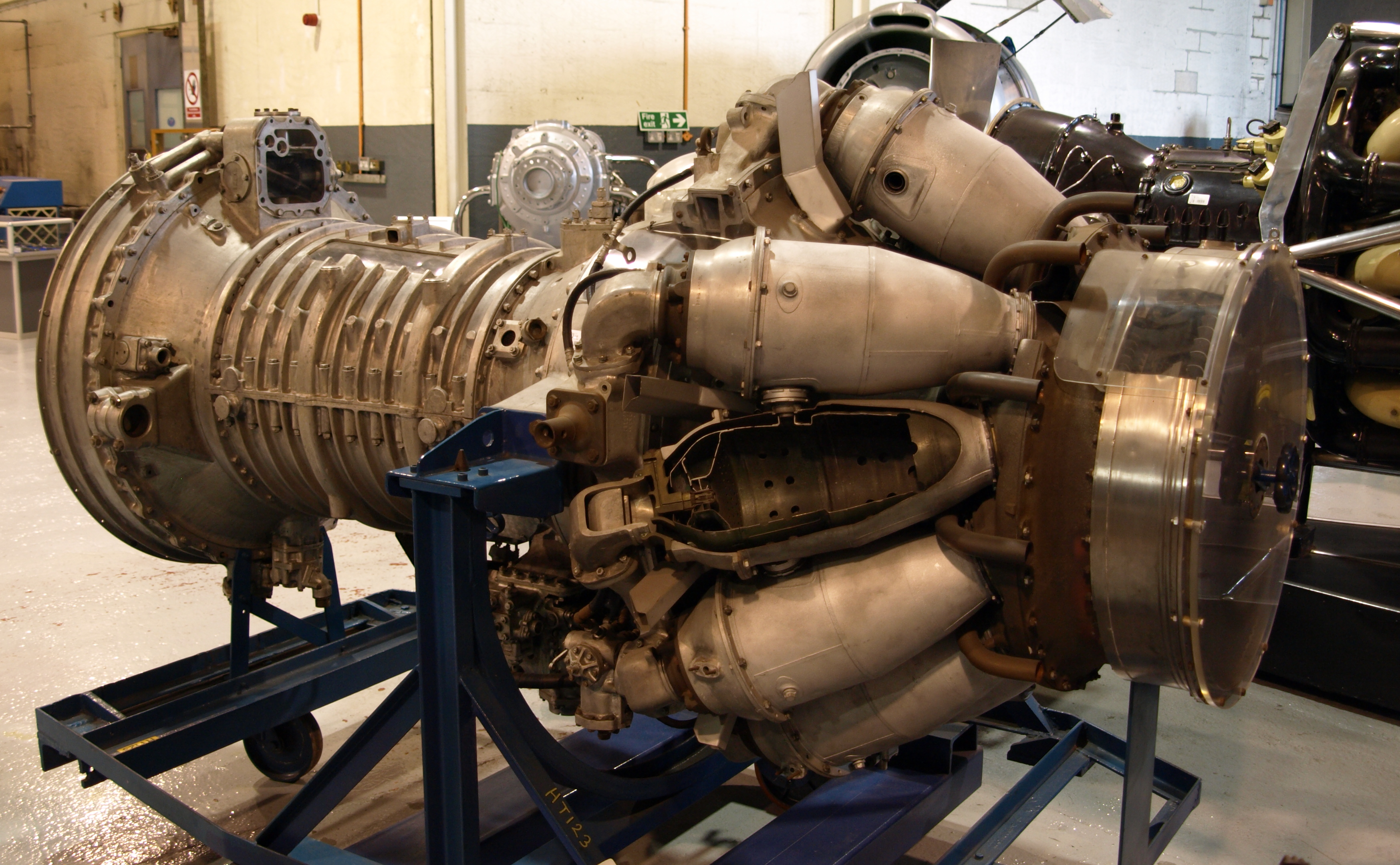
Side view with sectioned combustion chamber

Data from Turbojet History and Development 1930-1960 vol.1.

==== General characteristics ====
- Type: Two-Shaft Turboprop
- Length: 121.2 in (3,080 mm)
- Diameter: 46.8 in (1,190 mm)
- Dry weight: 2,800 lb (1,300 kg) (dry)

==== Components ====
- Compressor: LP - 9 stage axial, HP - Single centrifugal stage
- Combustors: Eleven can-type combustion chambers
- Turbine: HP - single stage axial, Power - single stage axial
- Fuel type: Kerosene (jet fuel grade)e
- Oil system: Pressure spray scavenge system

==== Performance ====
- Maximum power output: 4,030 eshp (3,006 kW)
- Overall pressure ratio: 6:1
- Air mass flow: 41.5 lb/s (18.8 kg/s)
- Specific fuel consumption: 0.71 lb/hp/hr (0.432 kg/kW/hr)
- Power-to-weight ratio: 1.439 eshp/lb (2.09 kW/kg)

== See also ==
Related lists

- List of aircraft engines
