= Jo Lancaster =

Royal Air Force Pilot

John Oliver Lancaster DFC CEng FRAeS (4 February 1919 – 10 August 2019) was a Royal Air Force bomber pilot who transitioned to a career as a test pilot for various firms. On 30 May 1949, he ejected from the experimental Armstrong Whitworth A.W.52 flying wing in a "primitive" Martin-Baker Mk.1 seat, becoming the first person to eject from a British aircraft in an emergency.

== Early career ==
In 1935, Lancaster joined Armstrong Whitworth Aircraft Ltd. on an engineering apprenticeship. In 1937 he joined the RAF Volunteer service, undergoing pilot training on DH 82 Tiger Moths.

On the night of 30–31 May 1942, he flew Wellington S9932 of 22 OTU on an op to Cologne, the first 1,000 plane raid, in which 600 acres (300 acres of the city centre) were damaged, 13,000 homes destroyed with another 6,000 badly damaged, leaving some 45,000 people homeless. The city suffered 5,000 casualties, including 469 deaths. Of the 1,046 bombers involved, "39 were lost – primarily to night fighters. This represented a loss of 4 percent which was considered the maximum Bomber Command could sustain." On 1–2 June 1942, piloted Wellington S9932 of 22 OTU on an op to Essen.

== Test pilot ==
Following Lancaster's operational tours, he was assigned to Aeroplane and Armament Experimental Establishment at Boscombe Down. In 1945 he completed the 3 Course Empire Test Pilots' School, and then in 1946 was seconded to Boulton-Paul Aircraft Ltd., and was later demobilised from the RAF. In 1946 he joined Saunders-Roe at Cowes, Isle of Wight, flying as deputy to Chief Test Pilot Geoffrey Tyson. Lancaster flew the Supermarine Walrus, Sea Otter, Short Sunderland and the Auster AOP.6 floatplane, as well as undertaking development test flying on the Saunders-Roe SR.A/1 jet fighter flying boat. His duties with Saunders-Roe ended in 1949 when he rejoined Armstrong Whitworth where he served as a test pilot under Chief Test Pilot Eric Franklin and participated in test programmes covering the Lancaster, Lincoln and York, Meteor T4, T7 and F8 and Night Fighter Mks. 11 to 14 and the Meteor TT20. He also tested the Sea Hawk, Hunter F2, F5, F6 and T7, Shackleton, Valetta, A.W.52G tailless experimental glider and Armstrong Whitworth A.W.52 experimental twin-jet flying-wing, Gloster Javelin and the Argosy.

== First British ejection ==
On 30 May 1949, Lancaster became the first pilot to eject in an emergency from a British aircraft when the flying wing A.W.52, TS363, out of Bitteswell, developed an oscillation in pitch during a shallow dive from ~5,000 feet, whilst in flight east of Leamington. "The plane which was on the secret list crashed in open country near Leamington Hastings. Jo Lancaster parachuted to safety and landed in a field at the rear of The Cuttle Inn at Long Itchington narrowly avoiding 'touch down' in the adjacent canal. It was the first ever deployment of the Martin-Baker ejection seat in an in-flight emergency."

== Later career ==
Lancaster retired in 1984. He has over 13,000 flight hours in his logbooks. As of 2003, he lived in retirement. In 2006, he corresponded with Aeroplane, providing details of his historic ejection. Lancaster died on 10 August 2019 at the age of 100.

== Published biography ==
In April 2016, Lancaster's biography First Out In Earnest: The Remarkable Life of Jo Lancaster DFC from Bomber Command Pilot to Test Pilot and the Martin Baker Ejection Seat by David Gunby, was published by Fighting High Publishing.
