= Armstrong Whitworth A.W.52 =

Airplane

A.W.52
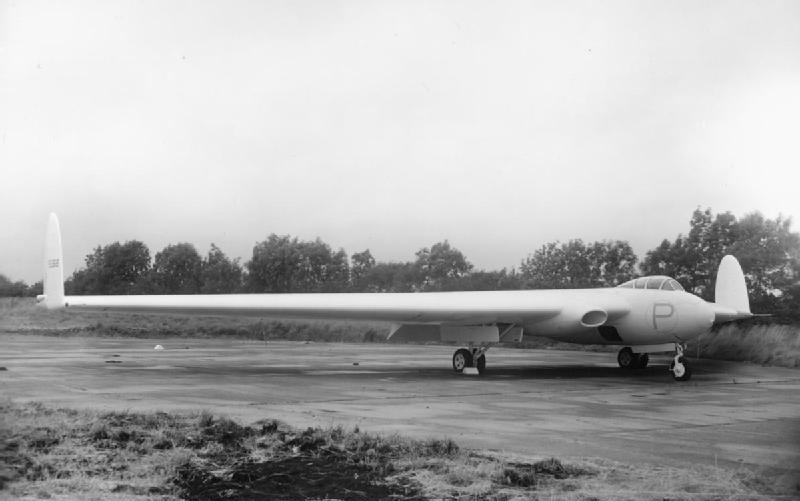
- The second jet-powered A.W.52 with Derwent engines

General information
- Type: Experimental flying wing
- National origin: United Kingdom
- Manufacturer: Armstrong Whitworth Aircraft
- Designer: John Lloyd
- Primary user: Royal Aircraft Establishment
- Number built: 2

History
- First flight: 13 November 1947
- Retired: 1954

The Armstrong Whitworth A.W.52 was an early flying wing aircraft designed and produced by British aircraft manufacturer Armstrong Whitworth Aircraft.

The A.W.52 emerged from wartime research into the laminar flow airfoil, which indicated that, in combination with the flying wing configuration, such an aircraft could be dramatically more efficient than traditional designs. It was pursued to gather data and experience with the configuration in support of Armstrong Whitworth's ambitions to develop its proposed flying wing jet airliner. Construction of the A.W.52 commenced during the late 1940s; a total of three aircraft, the A.W.52G glider and two jet-powered aircraft, were constructed for the research programme.

On 13 November 1947, the A.W.52 performed its maiden flight. On 30 May 1949, during a test flight, the first prototype encountered severe pitch oscillation that motivated its test pilot, John Oliver Lancaster, to eject from the aircraft; the incident was the first occasion of a genuine emergency ejection by a British pilot. The first prototype recovered and descended to the ground relatively undamaged. Shortly thereafter, Armstrong Whitworth decided to terminate all development work, having lost confidence in the configuration's practicality and the envisioned flying wing airliner that the A.W.52 was intended to lead to. Despite the termination, the second prototype remained flying with the Royal Aircraft Establishment until 1954.

== Development ==
=== Background ===
Interest in flying wing aircraft can be traced back to years prior to the First World War and the work of J. W. Dunne, which subsequently inspired various other aircraft engineers, such as G. T. R. Hill, to produce experimental aircraft such as the Westland-Hill Pterodactyl, during the 1920s and early 1930s. However, in spite of this early start, various difficulties inherent to the configuration repeatedly resulted in such efforts being abandoned without anything beyond experimental flying occurring. During the mid-1940s, Armstrong Whitworth became interested in the value of combining the flying wing configuration with that of two recent innovations: the laminar flow airfoil and the turbojet engine.

Amid the Second World War, John Lloyd of Armstrong Whitworth was approached by Ministry of Supply with a request to design a full-scale wing suitable for conducting laminar flow drag tests in a wind tunnel operated by the National Physical Laboratory. This would lead to real world testing of an Armstrong Whitworth-designed laminar flow wing fitted to a modified Hawker Hurricane, in which it was determined that positive performance gains were achieved, but that these were rapidly diminished as dirt accumulated on the wing and disturbed the airflow. Lloyd calculated that, the adoption of a relatively clean tailless layout in combination with a laminar wing would generate only one-third of the aerodynamic drag of a conventional aircraft, and quickly began outlining an envisioned airliner that incorporated these features.

An early design for this proposed airliner had emerged by 1943. It harnessed jet propulsion, being powered by either six or four engines, which were buried within the wing as to not disturb the airflow over the exterior surfaces. It had to be relatively large in comparison with any prior flying wing in order to provide sufficient headroom for passengers to be realistically carried. Thus, the proposed airliner had a weight of around 180,000 lb and a span of at least 160 ft. Furthermore, its structure was to possess relatively little weight due to the absence of a traditional fuselage or tail unit. However, this radical design would need to be tested exhaustively, which ought to include the test flying of scale aircraft. The initial design for such an aircraft was designated as the A.W.50.

=== A.W.52G ===
In order to test the design's low-speed characteristics, a single a 53 ft 10 in (16.41 m) span wooden glider known as the A.W.52G was designed. This glider was roughly half the size of the powered A.W.52, which in turn would be about half the size of the airliner. It was recognised that a glider could be completed quicker than a powered aircraft, and provide valuable aerodynamic data to refine the design of the powered follow-on aircraft, particularly in regards to control and stability. The A.W.52G was mainly made out of wood, and comprised three sections, a central unit with a nacelle for accommodating its two pilots, and the two outer wing sections. Control was achieved via two wing-tip elevons, which combined the functionality of traditional elevons and ailerons; a pair of Fowler flaps were also installed along the trailing edge.

During March 1943, construction of the AW.52G commenced. It was decided that it should be built with a pair of anti-spin parachutes installed at the wing tips to aid in its recovery should pilots encounter severe difficulty in the aircraft's handling. Almost exactly two years later, on 2 March 1945, the glider conducted its maiden flight, towed by an Armstrong Whitworth Whitley bomber. Tug releases from 20,000 ft (6,100 m) gave the glider a flight time of around 30 min continued; flight testing proceeded with typically satisfactorily result up until 1947. It was subsequently put on static display outside the company's Baginton facility before being broken up during the late 1950s.

While the glider had provided valuable data on the configuration's low speed characteristics, it was not capable of the high speed flight necessary to garner all of the needed data. For this, the production of self-propelled aircraft would be necessary. During late 1944, the Ministry of Supply had taken sufficient interest in Armstrong Whitworth's proposals that it issued a contract to the company for the production of a pair of two A.W.52 prototypes for evaluation purposes; they were nominally intended to serve as mail carrying aircraft.

=== A.W.52 ===
The A.W.52 was intended for high speed research and designed as an all-metal turbojet-powered aircraft, with a retractable undercarriage. Aerodynamically, it had much in common with the glider, both aircraft being moderately-swept flying wings with a centre section having a straight trailing edge. The wing tips carried small (not full chord) end-plate fin and rudders, which operated differentially, with a greater angle on the outer one. Roll and pitch were controlled with elevons that extended inward from the wing tips over most (in the case of the A.W.52 about three-quarters) of the outer, swept part of the trailing edge. The elevons moved together as elevators and differentially as ailerons. They were quite complicated surfaces – which included trim tabs – and hinged not from the wing but from "correctors", which were wing-mounted; the correctors provided pitch trim. To delay tip stall, air was sucked out of a slot just in front of the elevons, by pumps powered by undercarriage-mounted fans on the glider and directly from the engine in the A.W.52. The inner centre section wing carried Fowler flaps and the upper surface of the outer section carried spoilers.

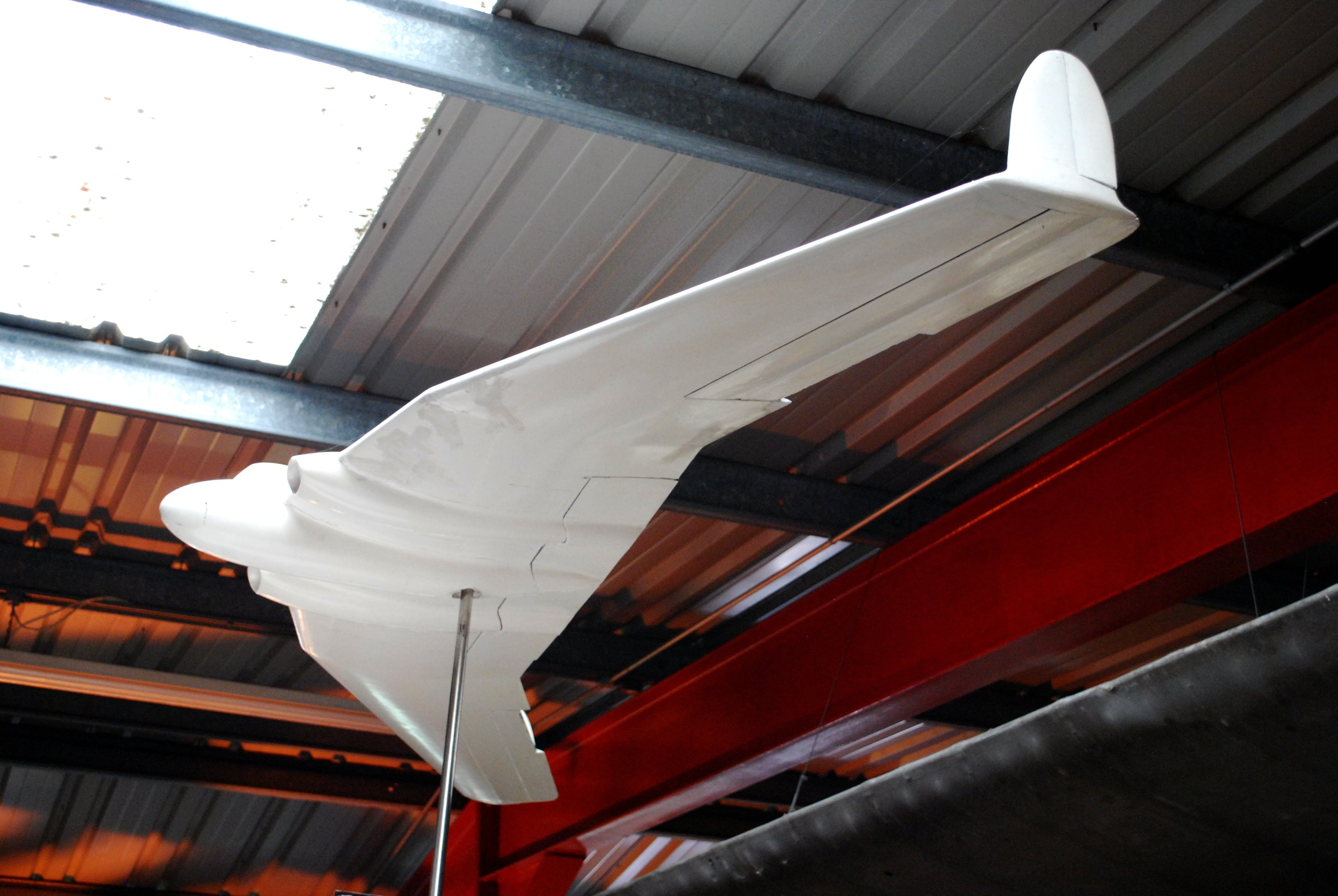
Model of the A.W.52 on display at the Midland Air Museum, Coventry

Maintenance of laminar flow over the wings was vital to the design and so they were built with great attention to surface flatness. Rather than the usual approach, where skinning is added to a structure defined by ribs, the A.W.52's wings were built in two halves (upper and lower) from the outside in, starting from pre-formed surfaces, adding stringers and ribs then joining the two halves together. The result was a surface smooth to better than 2/1000 of an inch (50 μm). The crew sat in tandem within a nacelle so that the pilot was just forward of the wing's leading edge, providing a better view than in the glider. This cockpit, which was pressurised, was close to the aircraft's central point, being slightly off-set to port. The engines were mounted in the wing centre section, close to the centre line and so not disturbing the upper wing surface. To prevent tip stalling, a boundary layer control system, powered by the engines, was incorporated.

The first prototype performed its first flight on 13 November 1947, powered by a pair of Rolls-Royce Nene engines, each capable of generating a maximum of 5,000 lbf (22 kN) of thrust. Almost one year later, it was followed by the second prototype on 1 September 1948; it was instead propelled by a pair of lower-powered Rolls-Royce Derwent engines, each capable of providing up to 3,500 lbf (16 kN). Trials of the two prototypes were largely disappointing: laminar flow could not be maintained, thus maximum speeds, though respectable, were less than had been expected. It was concluded that laminar flow could not be maintained on a flying wing as had been hoped. As in any tail-less aircraft, take-off and landing runs were longer than for a conventional aircraft (at similar wing loadings) because at high angles of attack, downward elevon forces were much greater than those of elevators with their large moment.

=== Accident and termination ===
On 30 May 1949, while diving the first prototype at 320 mph (510 km/h), test pilot John Oliver Lancaster encountered a pitch oscillation believed to be caused by elevon flutter. Starting at two cycles per second, it rapidly increased to incapacitating levels. With structural failure seemingly imminent, Lancaster opted to eject from the aircraft using its Martin-Baker Pre-Mk.1 ejection seat, and thus became the first British pilot to use the apparatus in a "live" emergency. It was fortunate that Lancaster was alone in the aircraft, as the second crew member was never provided with an ejection seat.

Subsequently, the aircraft stopped fluttering and glided down and landed in open country north of Southam in Warwickshire with relatively little damage. Following this incident, and in view of the relatively disappointing results that had been gathered so far, Armstrong Whitworth's management decided that no further effort would be exerted on the development of the flying wing concept. The company opted to allocate its resources towards the Armstrong Whitworth Apollo, a turboprop airliner that featured a more conventional configuration.

In the aftermath of Armstrong Whitworth's withdrawal, the second A.W.52 was handed over to the Royal Aircraft Establishment and transferred to RAE Farnborough, where it was used for experimental flying for several years. During June 1954 the aircraft was scrapped.

== Operators ==
United Kingdom

- Royal Aircraft Establishment

== Specifications (TS 363, Nene powered) ==
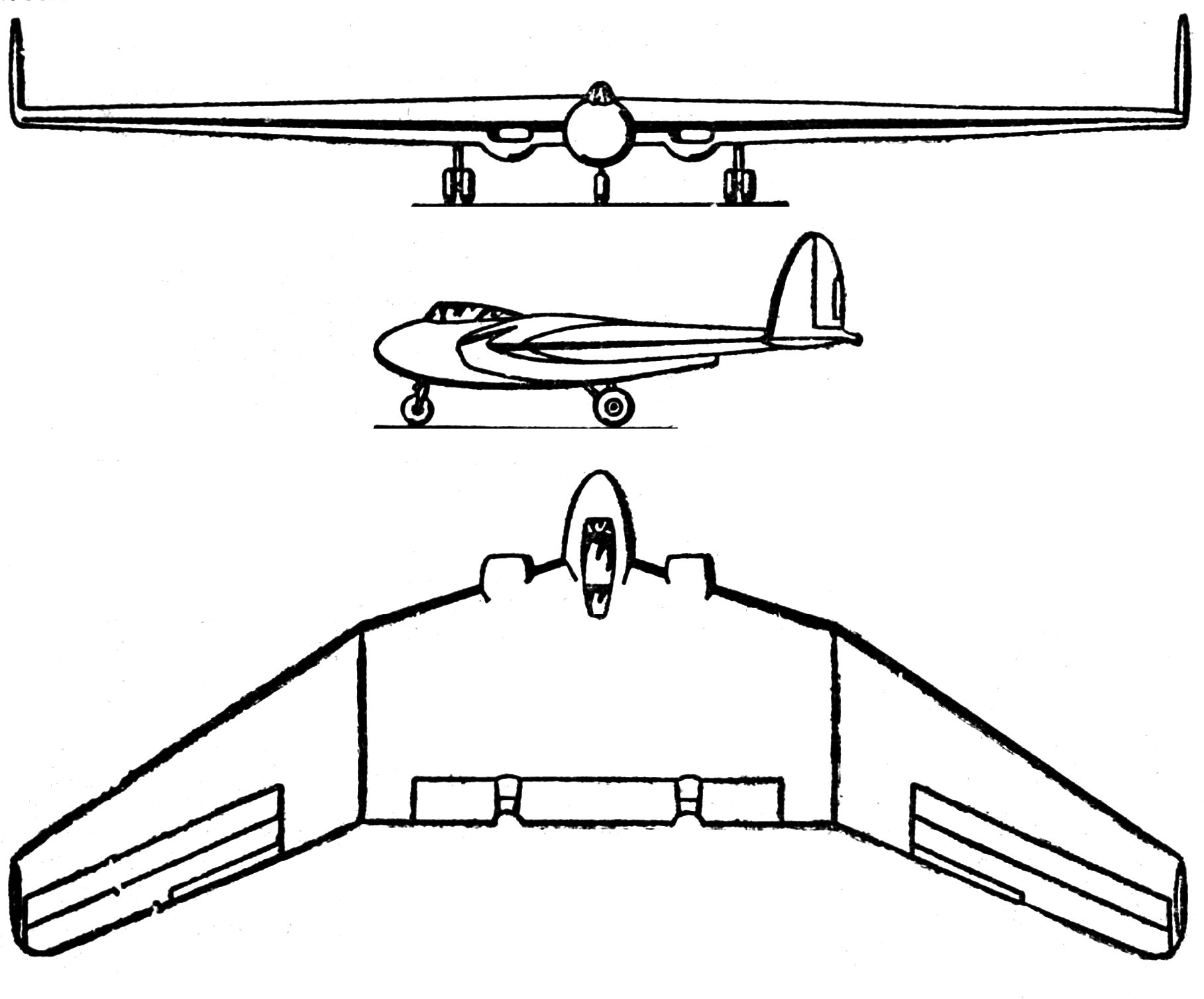
Armstrong Whitworth AW-52 3-view drawing from Les Ailes 18 January 1947

Data from Armstrong-Whitworth Aircraft since 1913, The Incomplete Guide to Airfoil Usage, Flight: 19 December 1946

General characteristics

- Crew: 2, pilot and navigator-wireless operator / flight test observer
- Capacity: 4,000 lb (1,800 kg) / 300 cu ft (8.5 m^{3})
- Length: 37 ft 5 in (11.4 m)
- Wingspan: 89 ft 11 in (27.4 m)
- Height: 14 ft 5 in (4.4 m)
- Wing area: 1,314 sq ft (122.1 m^{2})
- Airfoil: NPL.655-3-218 at root, tapering to NPL.655-3-118 at extremity of the centre section and to NPL.654-3-015 at the tips
- Empty weight: 19,660 lb (8,918 kg)
- Gross weight: 34,150 lb (15,490 kg)
- Powerplant: 2 × Rolls-Royce Nene centrifugal-flow turbojet, 5,000 lbf (22 kN) thrust each

Performance

- Maximum speed: 500 mph (800 km/h, 430 kn) at sea level
- Range: 1,500 mi (2,400 km, 1,300 nmi)
- Service ceiling: 36,000 ft (11,000 m)
- Rate of climb: 4,800 ft/min (24 m/s) at sea level
- Wing loading: 24.8 lb/sq ft (121 kg/m^{2})
- Max lift coefficient: 1.6

== See also ==
Aircraft of comparable role, configuration, and era

- Horten Ho 229
- Northrop XP-79
- Northrop YB-49

Related lists

- List of experimental aircraft
