= Martin-Baker Mk.1 =

British ejection seat

Mk.1
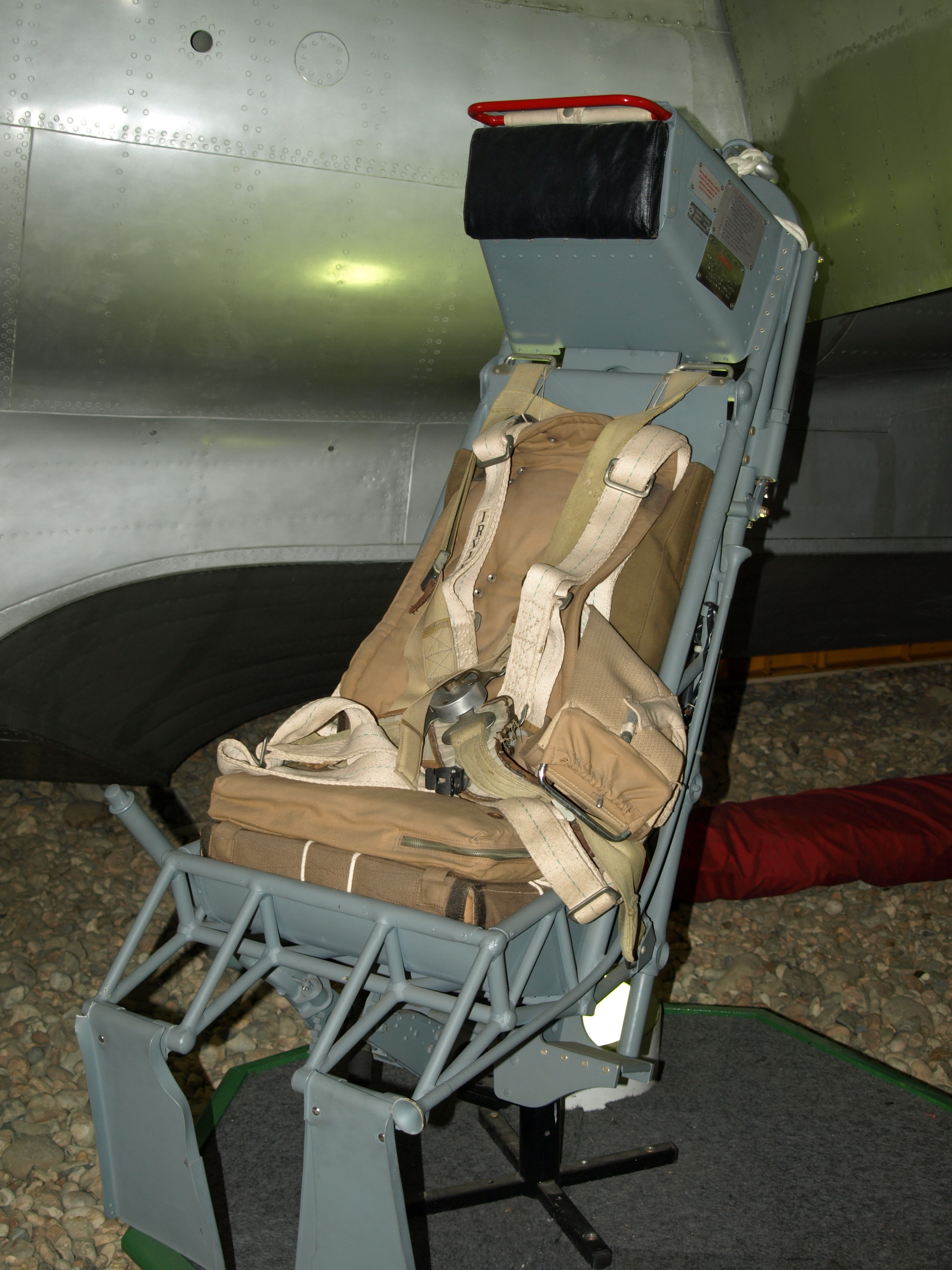
- Pre-production Martin-Baker Mk.1 seat as used in the Saunders-Roe SR.A/1 on display alongside the aircraft at the Solent Sky museum, Southampton

The Martin-Baker Mk.1 is a British ejection seat designed and built by Martin-Baker. Developed in the late 1940s it was the first in the line of production Martin-Baker seats for military aircraft. Ground and air testing of earlier designs resulted in the first successful test ejection of a company employee in July 1946. A seat type designed for the Saunders-Roe company was known as the Pre-Mk.1.

== History ==
The death of Valentine Baker in an aircraft accident in 1942 prompted James Martin to investigate new methods for aircrew escape and survival. Martin had previous experience of aircraft survival systems and had designed a quick-release canopy system during the Battle of Britain, a very successful device that was later fitted as standard to all Spitfires during manufacture.

In 1944 Martin was approached by the Air Staff after a fatal accident with the jet-powered Gloster F.9/40 (Gloster Meteor prototype). They asked for an escape system that forcibly ejected the pilot from an aircraft and was powerful enough to clear the tail surfaces at high airspeeds. German and Swedish engineers were investigating the same problem, but Martin was unaware of this.

Martin initially investigated systems that could be retro-fitted to existing fighter aircraft types that were in service at the time. His first design, a spring-powered swinging arm, hinged near the base of the fin, was not pursued although a Boulton Paul Defiant aircraft had been loaned to the Martin-Baker company for modification and testing.

A method using explosive charges to clear the seat from an aircraft was investigated next. As no information was available on what effect the g-forces might have on the human body a 16 ft (4.9 m) test rig was constructed at Denham for readings to be taken. On 20 January 1945 a 200 lb (91 kg) dummy was test fired on the rig. Four days later a company fitter, Bernard Lynch volunteered to test the system and was fired to a height of just under 5 ft (1.5 m) with no ill effects felt. The size of the explosive charge was progressively increased until Lynch reached a height of 10 ft (3.0 m) ft and declared that he was experiencing pain. News of the test quickly reached the aviation press; a journalist from The Aeroplane was hospitalised with crushed vertebrae after trying out the rig for himself.

James Martin was very concerned by this development and worked hard to reduce the peak acceleration loads felt by the occupant. The solution was to use a second charge firing in sequence and alterations to the seat to provide a posture that would protect the spine. Foot rests and a face blind firing handle were added.

Almost 200 tests were completed on the 26 ft (7.9 m) rig when testing transferred to a new 65 ft (20 m) rig, Bernard Lynch again being the first to use it on 17 August 1945, reaching a height of just over 26 ft (7.9 m). The need for airborne testing was apparent; the Defiant loaned for testing had its rear turret removed and a loaded seat had been fired from it whilst stationary on the ground on 10 May 1945. The next day the test was repeated in the air, and a further five tests up to indicated airspeeds of 300 mph (480 km/h) were successful.

On 12 September 1945 the Martin-Baker company was awarded a contract to design and produce two seats for high-speed testing. A Gloster Meteor aircraft was modified for testing. The first airborne test with this aircraft took place over Chalgrove airfield in June 1946. Using a dummy the parachute failed when it opened prematurely at a speed of 415 mph (668 km/h). A time-delay release mechanism was developed and initially suffered from problems. After many more tests it was felt that the system was safe enough for a manned live test. The volunteer was again Bernard Lynch, firing himself from the rear cockpit of the Meteor at 8,000 ft (2,400 m) over Chalgrove on 24 July 1946; the system worked perfectly.

Many more tests followed at ever increasing altitudes and airspeeds, some live and some with dummies. By 1948 the design had been refined enough to enter production for use in Royal Air Force and Fleet Air Arm aircraft. Prior to this order the Saunders-Roe company requested a seat to be used in its SR.A/1 jet-powered flying boat. This seat was known as the 'Pre-Mk.1' and did not feature all the refinements built into the production Mk.1 seats.

The first prototype Armstrong Whitworth A.W.52, TS363, crashed on 30 May 1949. The pilot, J.O. Lancaster, used the pre-Mk.1 ejection seat to save his life, making it the first occasion of an emergency ejection by a British pilot.

== Operation sequence ==
Operating the face blind firing handle initiated firing of the main gun located at the rear of the seat, the main gun being a telescopic tube with two explosive charges that fired in sequence. As the seat moved up its guide rails an emergency oxygen supply was activated.

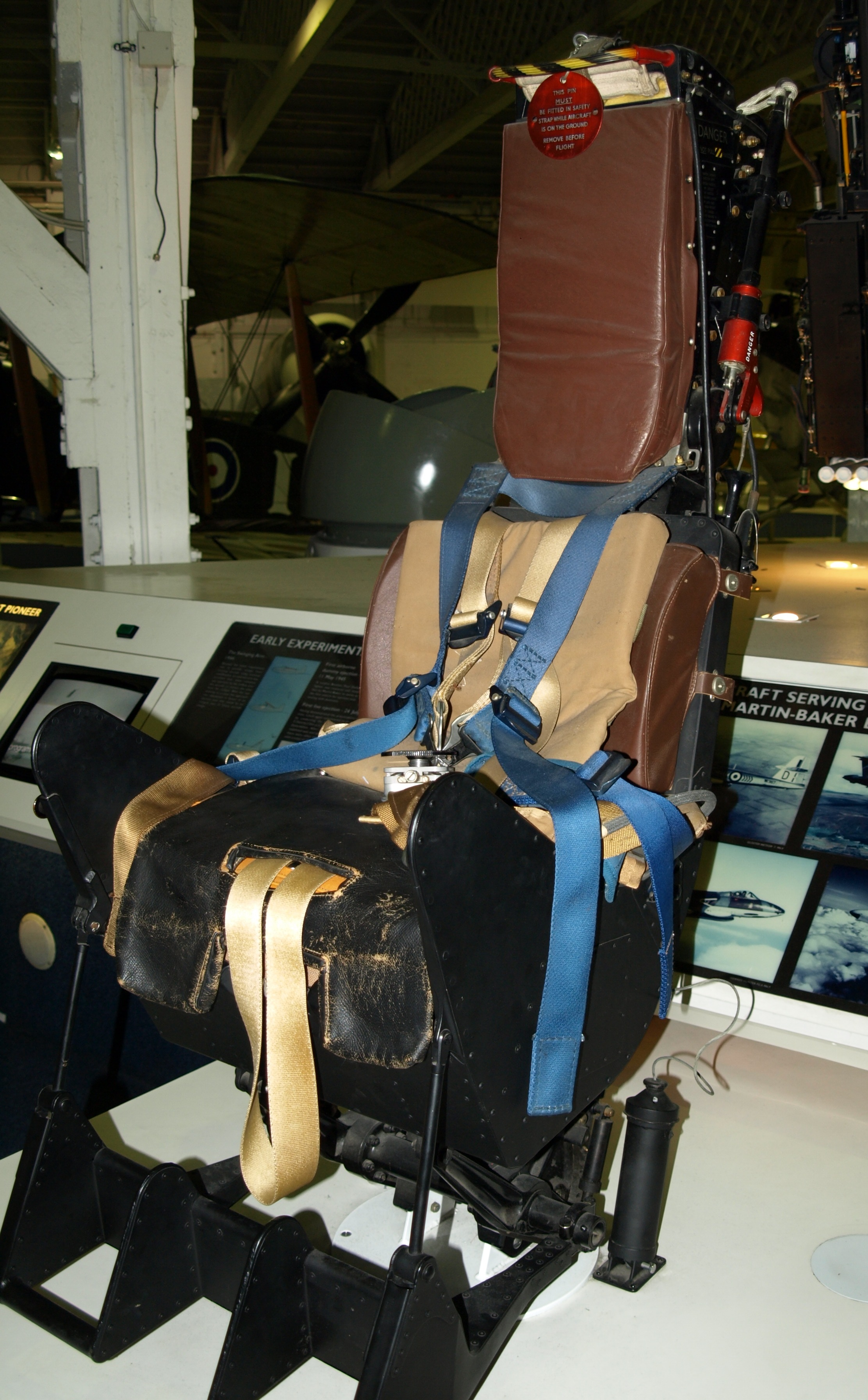
Martin-Baker Mk.1C ejection seat on display at the Royal Air Force Museum London

As the seat moved further up and out of the aircraft a lanyard attached to the cockpit floor fired a steel rod, known as the drogue gun, this extracted two small parachutes to stabilise the seat's descent path. The occupant then released themselves from the seat harness and operated the main parachute manually by pulling a ripcord.

== Applications ==
At some stage in their development examples of these aircraft were fitted with Martin-Baker Mk.1 ejection seats.

Test aircraft

- Boulton Paul Defiant
- Gloster Meteor

Pre Mk.1

- Armstrong Whitworth A.W.52
- Saunders-Roe SR.A/1

Mk.1

- Avro Canada CF-100 Canuck
- English Electric Canberra
- FMA IAe 33 Pulqui II
- Gloster Meteor
- Hawker Hunter
- Hawker Sea Hawk
- Supermarine Attacker
- Supermarine Swift
- Westland Wyvern

== Seats on display ==
- A Martin-Baker Pre-Mk.1 is on static display at the Solent Sky museum in Southampton.
- A Martin-Baker Mk.1C is on display at the Royal Air Force Museum London.

== Specifications (Mk.1) ==
- Maximum operating height: Not known
- Minimum operating height: Not known
- Minimum operating speed: Not known
- Maximum operating speed: 400+ knots indicated airspeed
