= Armstrong Siddeley Python =

British turboprop engine

Python
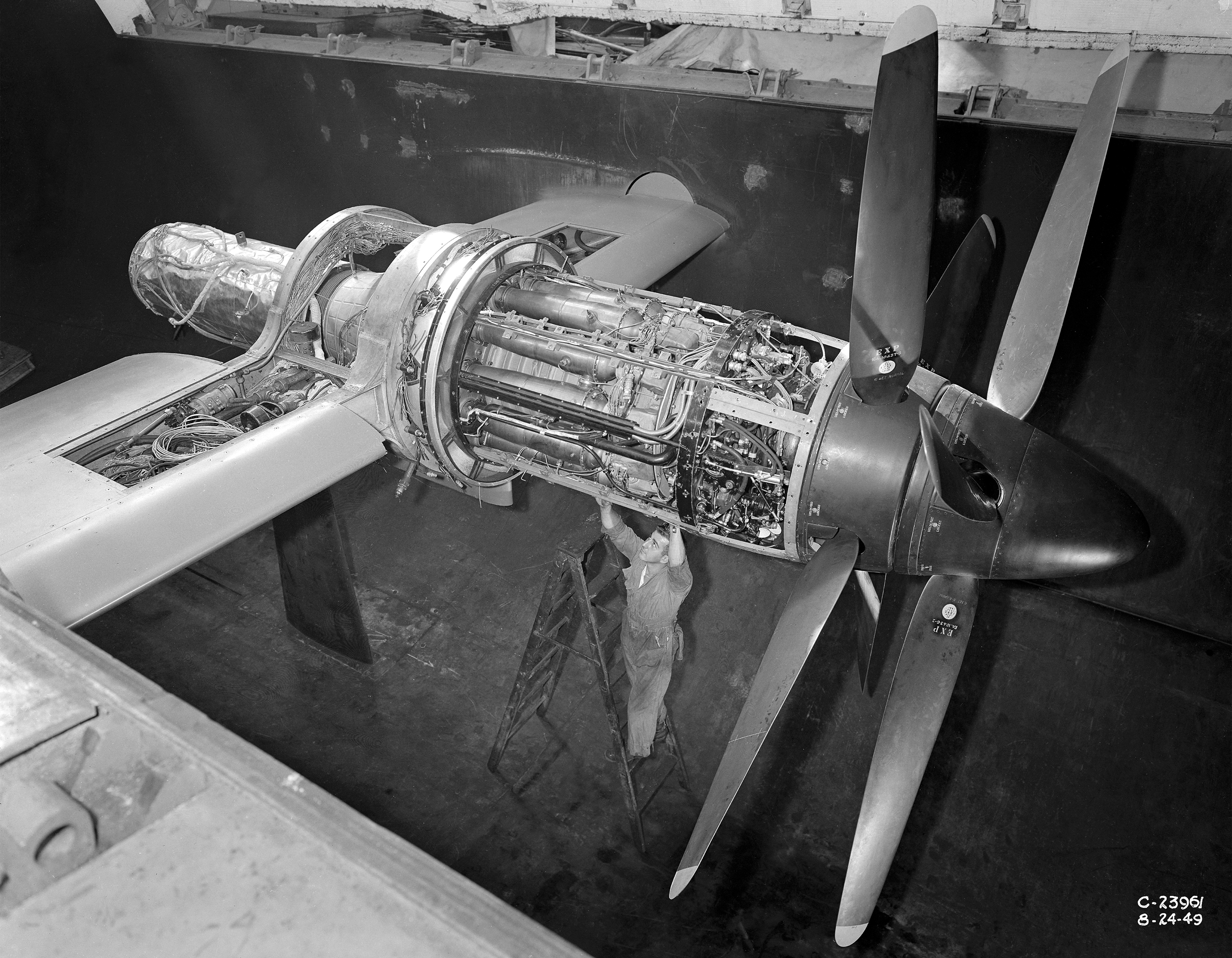
- An Armstrong Siddeley Python during NACA wind tunnel testing in 1949
- Type: Turboprop
- National origin: United Kingdom
- Manufacturer: Armstrong Siddeley
- First run: April 1945
- Major applications: Westland Wyvern
- Developed from: Armstrong Siddeley ASX

The Armstrong Siddeley Python is an early British turboprop engine that was designed and built by the Armstrong Siddeley company in the mid-1940s. Its main use was in the Westland Wyvern, a carrier-based heavy fighter. The prototypes had used the Rolls-Royce Eagle piston engine, but Pythons were used in production aircraft. In this application, the Python was rated at 4,110 equivalent shaft horsepower (eshp).

== Design and development ==
The design started as an experimental pure-turbojet known as the ASX, which commenced testing in 1943. By this point other engine designs were already entering pre-production, and it seemed there was little need for the ASX in its existing form. The design was then modified by the addition of a reduction gearbox to drive a propeller. The turboprop thus formed was named ASP.

=== Flight testing ===
Early flight-testing of the Python was carried out using the Lancaster B.1 (FE) TW911 and the Lincoln B.2 RE339/G: in each aircraft Pythons replaced the two outboard Rolls-Royce Merlins.

Lincoln B.2 RF403 had two Pythons similarly installed and was used for high-altitude bombing trials at Woomera, South Australia. These trials were principally of the ballistic casings for the Blue Danube atomic weapon: the Lincoln was the only available aircraft that could accommodate the large weapon casing, measuring 62 inches diameter x 24 feet (7.3 m) in length. The Pythons were fitted to increase the height from which tests could be carried out. Maximum release height and speed for the first eleven tests was 275 mph and 34,783 ft (10,602 m) with a bombing error of 61 ft.

== Engines on display ==
An Armstrong Siddeley Python is on display at the East Midlands Aeropark Castle Donington.

== Variants ==
ASP.1 (Python 1)
reduction gear ratio 0.127:1
ASP.2 (Python 2)
reduction gear ratio 0.135:1
ASP.3 (Python 3)

== Applications ==
- Avro Lancaster - (test only)
- Avro Lincoln - (test only)
- Westland Wyvern

== Specifications (ASP.3) ==
Data from Flight.

==== General characteristics ====
- Type: Turboprop
- Length: 123.2 in (313 cm)
- Diameter: 54 in (137 cm)
- Dry weight: 3,450 lb (1,565 kg)

==== Components ====
- Compressor: Axial flow; 14 stages
- Combustors: 11 combustion chambers
- Turbine: Axial flow; two stages

==== Performance ====
- Maximum power output: 4,110 eshp (3,065 kW) at sea level at 8,000 rpm, including 1,180 lbf (535 kp) exhaust thrust
- Overall pressure ratio: 5.35:1
- Air mass flow: 52.5 lb/s (23.8 kg/s)
- Specific fuel consumption: 0.805 lb/(h eshp)
- Power-to-weight ratio: 1.2:1

== See also ==
Related development

- Armstrong Siddeley ASX

Related lists

- List of aircraft engines
