= Saunders-Roe SR.A/1 =

Prototype flying boat fighter aircraft

SR.A/1
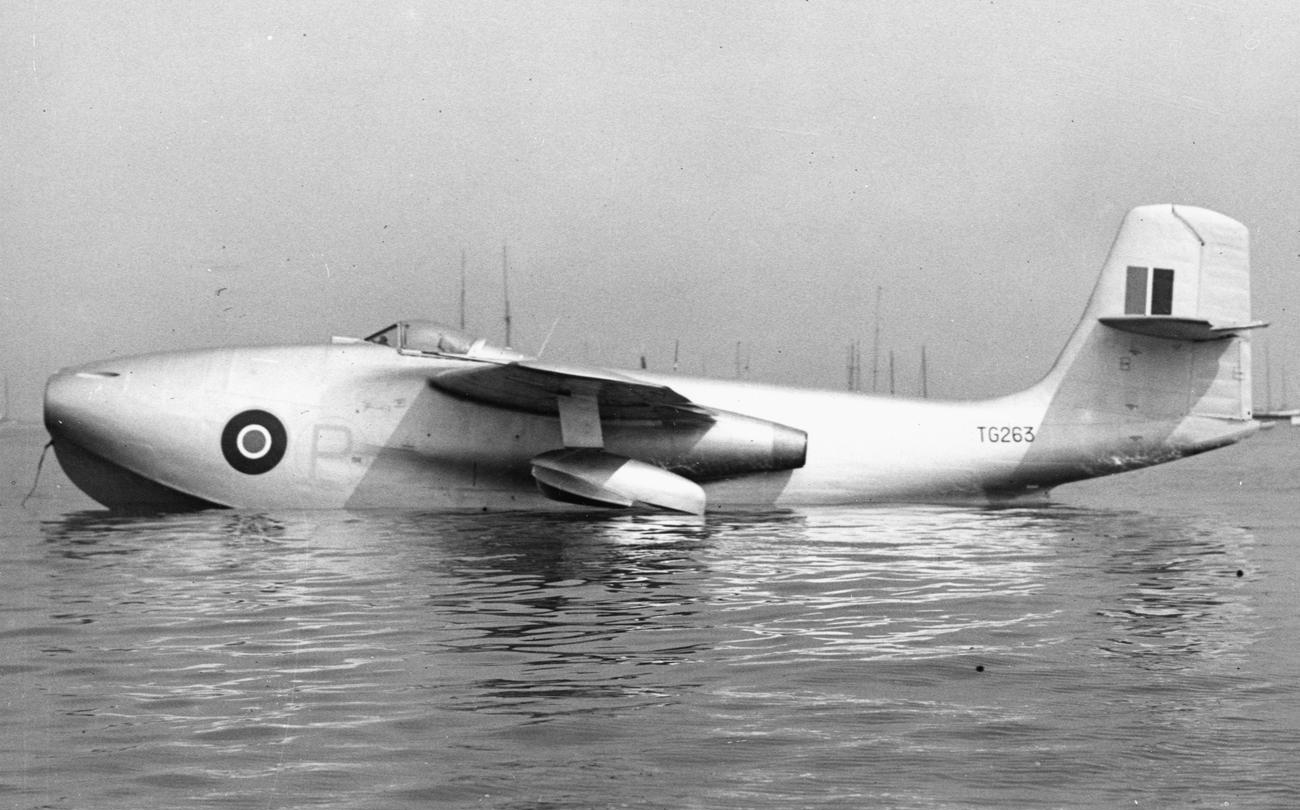
- TG263 on the water

General information
- Type: Flying boat fighter
- Manufacturer: Saunders-Roe
- Status: Experimental
- Primary user: Marine Aircraft Experimental Establishment
- Number built: 3

History
- First flight: 16 July 1947
- Retired: 1951

The Saunders-Roe SR.A/1 is a prototype flying boat fighter aircraft designed and built by British seaplane manufacturer Saunders-Roe. It is the first jet-propelled water-based aircraft in the world.

The concept behind the SR.A/1 originated during the Second World War as a reaction to Japan's successful use of military floatplanes and the emergence of the turbojet engine. Saunders-Roe presented an initial proposal of their jet-powered seaplane concept, then designated SR.44, to the Air Ministry during mid-1943. In April 1944, the Ministry issued Specification E.6/44 for the type and supported its development with a contract for three prototypes. Development was protracted by Saunders-Roe's work on other projects, the war having ended prior to any of the prototypes being completed.

On 16 July 1947, the first prototype made its maiden flight. The SR.A/1 was evaluated by the Royal Air Force (RAF), who concluded that the design was incapable of matching up to the performance of land-based designs. Despite interest from foreign governments, including the United States, no orders for the SR.A/1 materialised. As such, it never entered volume production or saw service with any operators. While interest in the SR.A/1 programme was briefly revived following the start of the Korean War, the aircraft was considered to be obsolete by that point and was again rejected.

== Design and development ==
=== Origins ===
The SR./A.1 was directly inspired by the modest successes experienced by the Imperial Japanese Navy in using seaplane fighters, such as the Nakajima A6M2-N (an adaptation of the Mitsubishi Zero) and the Kawanishi N1K. Seaplanes had performed successfully during both of the world wars although, according to author H. F. King, their achievements were often not highly publicised or well known. Prior to the introduction of the Gloster Gladiator, every British shipborne fighter was designed with an interchangeable wheel-or-float undercarriage. In theory, seaplanes were ideally suited to conditions in the Pacific theatre of the Second World War, and could turn any relatively calm area of coast into an airbase. Their main disadvantage came from the way in which the bulk of their flotation gear penalised their performance compared to other fighters.

Both immediately prior to and during the war, Britain made very little use of seaplane fighters, instead relying upon aircraft carriers and land-based fighters as the basis of their military operations, despite the concept having remained popular with other powers, including Japan, Italy, and France. Proposed seaplane conversions were produced for both the Hawker Hurricane and the Supermarine Spitfire to meet operational needs in the Norwegian Campaign, but were largely curtailed following the rapid German victory in this theatre. No quantity production of seaplane fighters followed. It was in this backdrop that British seaplane manufacturer Saunders-Roe recognised that the newly developed turbojet engine presented an opportunity to overcome the traditional performance drawbacks and design limitations of floatplanes. By not requiring clearance for a propeller, the fuselage could sit lower in the water and use a flying boat-type hull. The prospective aircraft's performance when powered by Halford H.1 engines was projected to be 520 mph at 40,000 ft.

Saunders-Roe speculated that, as floatplanes could have staging grounds nearer to their objectives than land-based counterparts, both the time and effort involved in mounting missions, particularly offensive ones, could be reduced. Early jet aircraft were typically restrained in terms of their range due to the high fuel consumption involved, a factor which could be overcome by bringing forward their staging areas, something which a floatplane would be readily capable of doing. Re-basing to virtually any body of water could also be performed with little in the way of setup or ground preparation, according to the company.

=== Order and production preparations ===
Saunders-Roe first presented their idea, then designated as the SR.44, to the Air Ministry during mid-1943. Criticisms of the design were produced by Ministry officials, included the observation that the wing thickness/chord ratio was considered to be too high for a high-speed fighter when operating at a high altitude. In response to these criticisms, the seaplane's design was modified and refined. During April 1944, the Air Ministry issued Specification E.6/44 in direct response to the modified design. In the following month, an accompanying development contract covering the production of three prototypes was issued to Saunders-Roe.

At this point, there were intentions for the SR.A/1 to be used in the Pacific theatre against Japan; as such, there were measures taken even at an early stage of development to support immediate quantity production. However, shortly following the end of the Pacific War in August 1945, Saunders-Roe opted to concentrate its efforts on the Saunders-Roe Princess, a long-range civilian flying boat project, a choice which caused development of the fighter to slip behind. Due to the war's end, pressure for the commencement of the type's production had lessened significantly.

=== Flight testing and cancellation ===
On 16 July 1947, the first prototype, piloted by Geoffrey Tyson, conducted its maiden flight. Barely two weeks later, Tyson flew the fifth flight for a crowd of officials representing multiple organisations, including the Royal Navy, the Royal Air Force, the Royal Aircraft Establishment, Saunders-Roe, Metropolitan-Vickers and at least one unidentified foreign government. Subsequent flight testing with the prototypes revealed that the SR.A/1 possessed a relatively good level of performance and handling. Its agility was publicly displayed when Tyson performed a demonstration of high-speed aerobatics and inverted flight above an international audience at the 1948 Farnborough Airshow while piloting the type. During the flight test programme, two of the three prototypes suffered accidents, leading to an interruption in the trials and modifications being made to the remaining intact aircraft.

TG263 appeared in a Pathé Newsreel in July 1947. TG271 appeared in a BBC Newsreel in August 1948.

The SR.A/1 possessed a somewhat small and heavily framed cockpit canopy, which provided the pilot with a poor view outside the aircraft, a particularly negative feature for a prospective fighter aircraft. Despite this, the pressurised cockpit was relatively spacious, providing enough room to accommodate an additional crew member potentially; an observer could also have been seated in a more rearward position. As a measure to increase survivability, two of the SR.A/1 prototypes were fitted with the first two production Martin-Baker ejection seats to be built. An automatic mooring system was incorporated, allowing the pilot to moor the aircraft without any external aids or even having to leave the cockpit. The air intake for the engines was extendable to minimise the ingestion of seawater during takeoffs, although testing revealed only minor performance decreases due to this factor. To reduce drag, the floats could be retracted during flight.

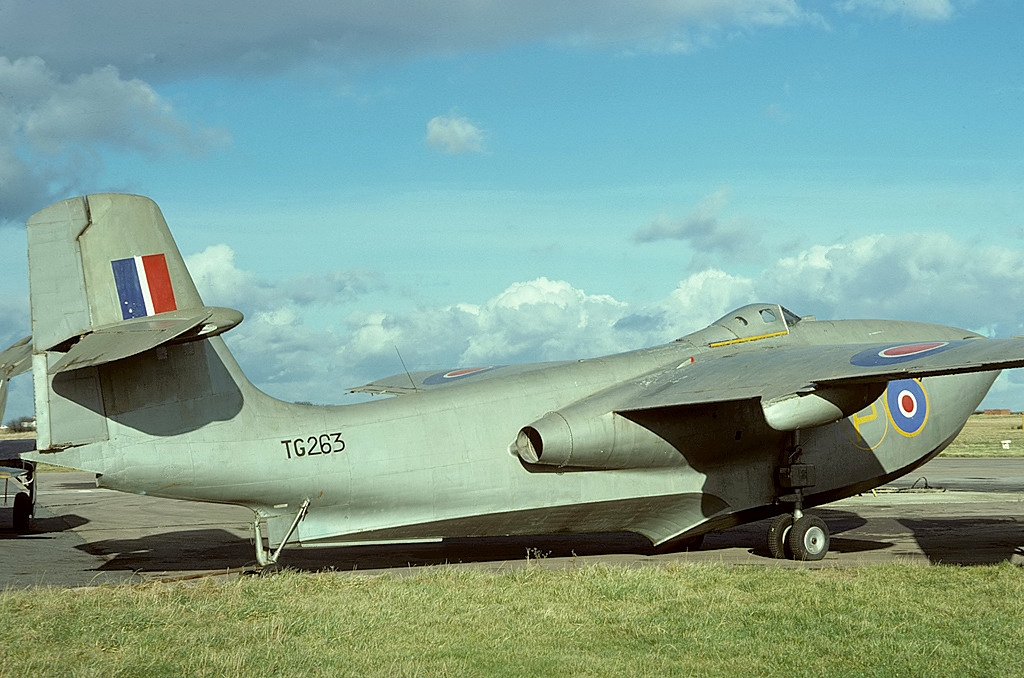
The Saunders-Roe SR.A/1

A fundamental problem that emerged during development was that the Beryl engine, which powered the type, had ceased production when British manufacturing conglomerate Metropolitan-Vickers had decided to withdraw from jet engine development, leaving only a limited number of engines available. For any production to have proceeded, an alternative powerplant would have to have been acquired. Despite possessing some favourable qualities, officials judged that the need for such aircraft had completely evaporated with the end of the war. Furthermore, the success of the aircraft carrier in the Pacific had demonstrated a far more effective way to project airpower over the oceans, though Saunders-Roe argued that carriers and their escorts were still very vulnerable to aircraft or other vessels.

Due to a lack of orders, work on the project was suspended, leading to the remaining prototype being placed into storage in early 1950. During November 1950, shortly after the outbreak of the Korean War, interest in the SR.A/1 programme was briefly resurrected. This interest was not just confined to Britain; data on the project was also passed onto the United States. However, it was soon recognised that the concept had been rendered obsolete in comparison to increasingly capable land-based fighters, together with the inability to solve the engine problem, forcing a second and final cancellation. During June 1951, the SR.A/1 prototype (TG263) flew for the last time. It is now in the Solent Sky Museum in Southampton, UK.

Although the aircraft never received an official name, it was commonly referred to by company workers as "Squirt".

== P.121 Hydro-ski naval fighter ==
Despite the SR.A/1's rejection, Saunders-Roe remained interested in the development of military seaplanes, performing several internal design studies on the subject, including some relatively radical concepts. Amongst these were designs that drew or built upon the SR.A/1. During the early 1950s, the company worked on a new fighter design featuring skis — aircraft publication Flight referred to it as the "Saunders-Roe Hydroski" — with the aim of bringing its performance closer to that of land-based aircraft. By adopting hydroskis and dispensing with the hull approach of the SR.A/1, no concessions to hydrodynamic requirements were imposed upon the fuselage. It was designated Project P.121.

Work on the P.121 reportedly "received no official support". On 29 January 1955, the company decided not to proceed with the construction of a prototype.

== Operators ==
United Kingdom

- Marine Aircraft Experimental Establishment

== Survivors ==
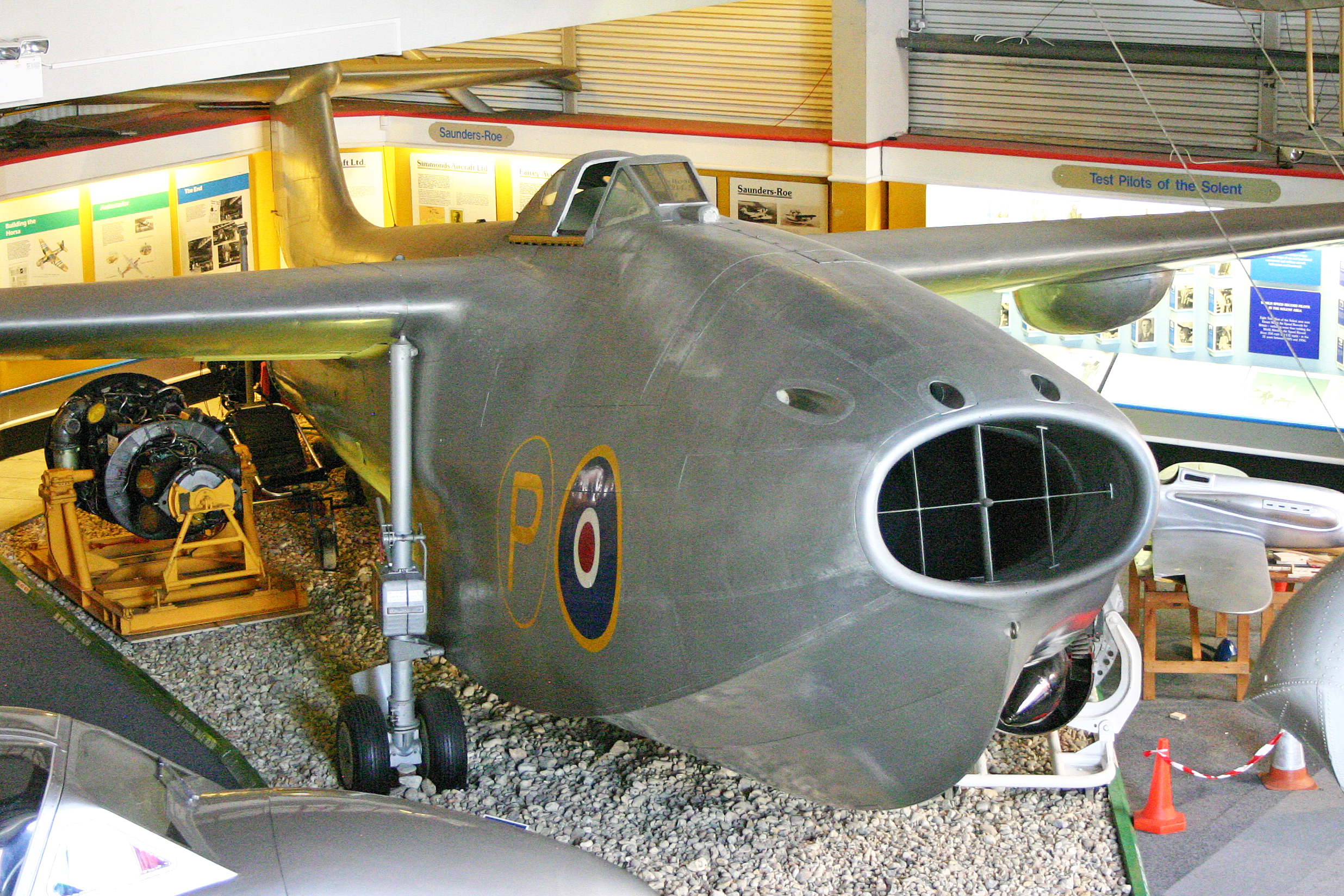
TG263 at Solent Sky in 2011

The first prototype, serial number TG263, has been preserved and is on display at Solent Sky aviation museum in Southampton. Both other aircraft (TG267 and TG271) were lost in accidents during the four-year flight test programme.

== Specification (SR.A/1) ==
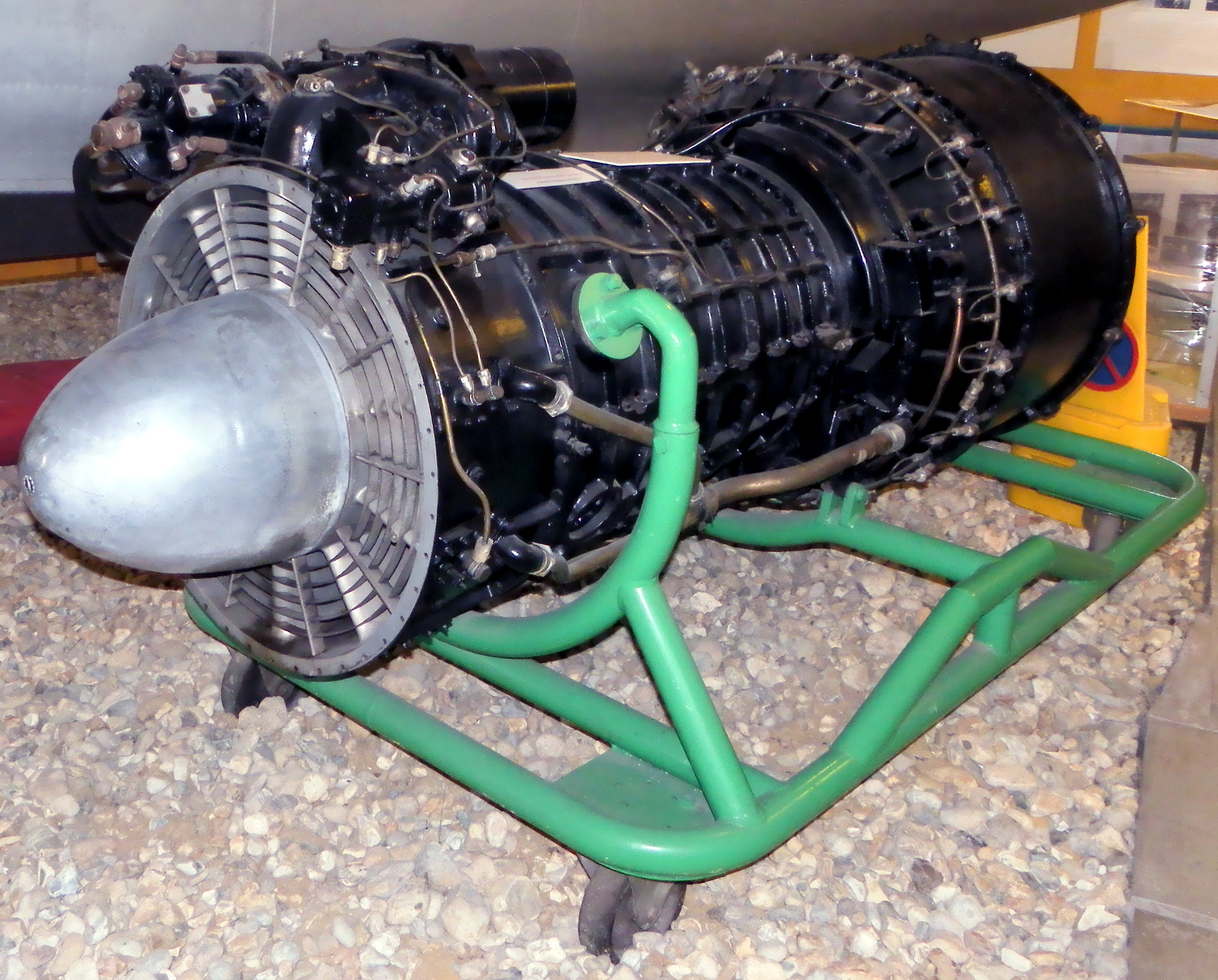
A Metropolitan-Vickers F.2/Beryl turbojet engine

Data from British Flying Boats

General characteristics

- Crew: 1
- Length: 50 ft 0 in (15.24 m)
- Wingspan: 46 ft 0 in (14.02 m)
- Height: 16 ft 9 in (5.11 m)
- Wing area: 415 sq ft (38.6 m^{2})
- Empty weight: 11,262 lb (5,108 kg)
- Gross weight: 16,000 lb (7,257 kg)
- Max takeoff weight: 19,033 lb (8,633 kg) max. overload weight with slipper tanks
- Fuel capacity: 424 imp gal (509 US gal; 1,930 L) internal fuel, provision for two 149 imp gal (179 US gal; 680 L) slipper tanks
- Powerplant: 2 × Metropolitan-Vickers Beryl MVB.2 turbojets, 3,850 lbf (17.1 kN) thrust each

Performance

- Maximum speed: 512 mph (824 km/h, 445 kn)
- Endurance: 1 hr 48 min
- Service ceiling: 48,000 ft (15,000 m)

Armament

- Guns: 4 × 20 mm Hispano Mk 5
- Rockets: 8 × rockets
- Bombs: 2 × 1000 lb (455 kg) bombs

== See also ==
- Eric Brown

Aircraft of comparable role, configuration, and era

- Convair F2Y Sea Dart

Related lists

- List of aircraft of the Royal Air Force
- List of fighter aircraft
- List of flying boats and floatplanes
