= Westland Wyvern =

British military aircraft

Wyvern
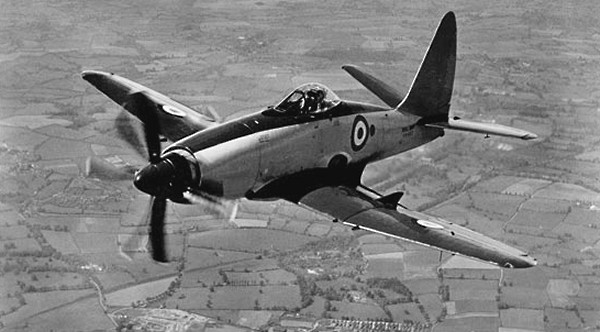
- Wyvern S.4

General information
- Type: Carrier-based strike aircraft
- National origin: United Kingdom
- Manufacturer: Westland Aircraft
- Primary user: Royal Navy
- Number built: 127

History
- Manufactured: 1946–1956
- Introduction date: 1953
- First flight: 16 December 1946 (Note: Some sources give 12 December 1946 for first flight)
- Retired: 1958

The Westland Wyvern is a British single-seat carrier-based multi-role strike aircraft built by Westland Aircraft that served in the 1950s, seeing service in the 1956 Suez Crisis. Production Wyverns were powered by a turboprop engine driving large and distinctive contra-rotating propellers, and could carry aerial torpedoes.

== Design and development ==
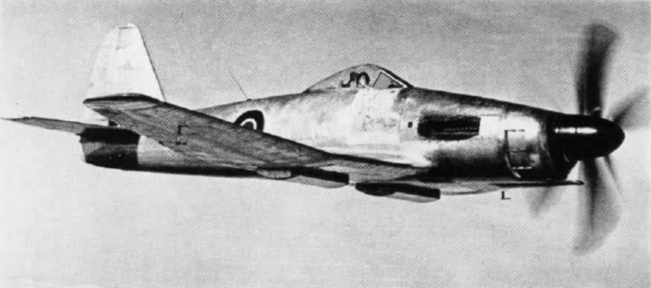
A Wyvern prototype with the Rolls-Royce Eagle piston engine

The Wyvern began as a Westland project for a naval strike fighter, with the engine located behind the pilot, driving a propeller in the nose via a long shaft that passed under the cockpit floor, similar to the Bell P-39. This enabled the pilot to be located in a position that conferred the best possible visibility over the nose for carrier operations. Official interest resulted in Air Ministry Specification N.11/44 for a long-range naval fighter using the 24-cylinder H-block Rolls-Royce Eagle 22 piston engine (unrelated to the First World War-era engine of the same name) being issued to cover Westland's design. The specification also called for an airframe design that would be able to take a turboprop engine when a suitable unit was available. There was a parallel specification for the Royal Air Force, F.13/44, for which Hawker submitted the competing P.1027, a development of the Tempest. The RAF variant was cancelled, when in 1945 it was decided that all future fighter aircraft would be jet-powered.

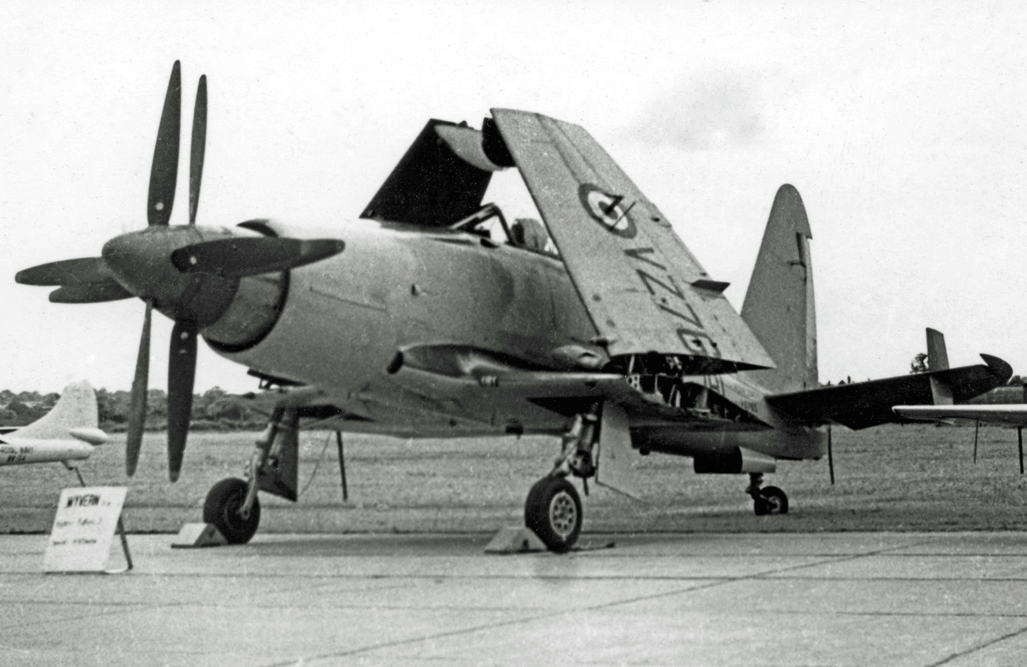
Wyvern S.4 strike aircraft of 813 Naval Air Squadron at RNAS Stretton in 1955

The original design soon matured into the more conventional Westland W.34, with the 3,500 hp (2,610 kW) Eagle engine in the nose driving large contra-rotating propellers and the pilot sitting high in a humped fuselage to improve visibility. The design was otherwise orthodox, with a low wing, tailwheel undercarriage and double-folding wings fitted with both Youngman flaps on the inner wing section and conventional flaps on the outer section. The W.34 was to be armed with four Hispano 20 mm cannon in the wings and have the ability to carry a torpedo under the fuselage or a selection of bombs and rockets under the wings.

The prototype W.34; the Wyvern TF.1, first flew at Boscombe Down on 16 December 1946 with Westland's test pilot Harald Penrose at the controls. This aircraft was lost on 15 October 1947 when the propeller bearings failed in flight. Westland's assistant test pilot Sqn. Ldr. Peter Garner was killed attempting to make an emergency landing. From prototype number three onwards, the aircraft were navalised and carried their intended armament.

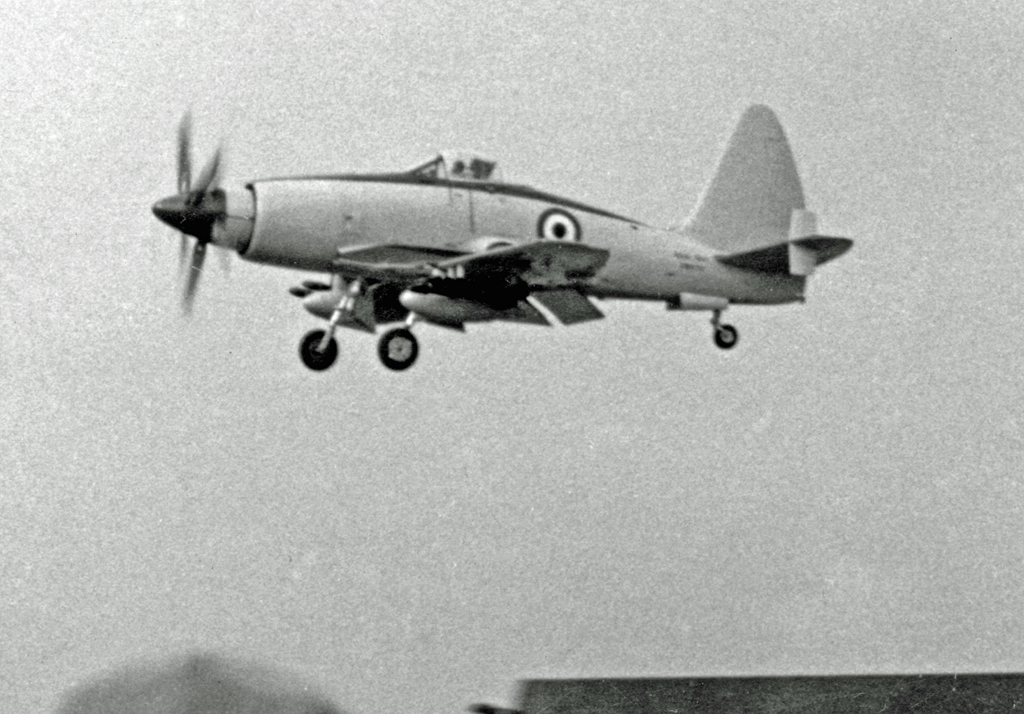
Wyvern TF.2 being demonstrated at the Farnborough Air Show in 1953 by a Westland pilot

At around this time, the Eagle engine was cancelled and it was found that there were insufficient pre-production engines available to complete all the prototype and pre-production aircraft. Specification N.12/45 was therefore issued for the Wyvern TF.2, to be powered by a turboprop engine: either the Rolls-Royce Clyde or the Armstrong Siddeley Python. A single Clyde-powered prototype was ordered along with two with Pythons. A Clyde-powered TF.2 first flew on 18 January 1949. Both the piston-powered and turboprop versions shared many common components including wing and tail units, and essentially the same basic cockpit structure. The flight was cut short to only three minutes when shortly after takeoff, the cockpit filled with smoke from a fuel leak onto the exhaust ducting. Clyde development was subsequently cancelled by Rolls-Royce after only 50 hours of flight time for the TF.2, and the aircraft was delivered to Napier & Son to be fitted with the Nomad turbo-compound engine. The latter engine never materialised, however and this aircraft was used for crash barrier trials.

The first Python-powered TF.2 flew on 22 March 1949 and this aircraft introduced the ejection seat to the Wyvern. Twenty TF.2s were completed to the Python design although after three years of testing what was then a revolutionary aircraft design, a myriad of detailed aerodynamic changes resulted. The Python engine responded poorly to minor throttle adjustments, so control was exercised by running the engine at a constant speed and varying the pitch of the propellers. The aircraft was declared ready for service in 1952, but never reached an operational squadron.

The definitive Wyvern model was the TF.4, later S.4. Initially, 50 S.4s were ordered and were joined by the last 7 TF.2s, which were altered while still under construction. S.4s reached limited shore-based front line service in May 1953 with 813 Naval Air Squadron at RNAS Ford, replacing the somewhat similar (and equally troubled) Blackburn Firebrand. Several second-line squadrons also received Wyverns around this time.

Total production was 127 airframes with 124 aircraft completed, as the last three Eagle piston-engined airframes, VR138, -139, and -140, were never completed.

== Operational history ==
The first carrier trials were carried out by the first pre-production Wyvern TF.2 aboard HMS Illustrious on 21 June 1950. Despite this, when the Wyvern S.4 entered service with 813 Naval Air Squadron in May 1953, it had not obtained clearance for carrier operations, this being obtained only in April 1954. The Wyvern was in service with the Fleet Air Arm from 1954 to 1958. Wyverns equipped 813 Squadron, 827 Squadron, 830 Squadron and 831 Squadron of the Fleet Air Arm.

In September 1954, 813 embarked with their Wyverns on HMS Albion for carrier-based service in the Mediterranean. The Wyvern soon showed a worrying habit for flameout on catapult launch: the high G forces involved caused fuel starvation. A number of aircraft were lost off Albion's bow and Lt. B. D. Macfarlane made history on 13 October 1954 when he successfully ejected under water using his Martin-Baker Mk.1 ejection seat after his aircraft had ditched on launch and been cut in two by the carrier. 813 did not return to Albion until March 1955 when the problems had been resolved.

830 Sqn. took the Wyvern into combat from HMS Eagle, flying 79 sorties during Operation Musketeer, the armed response to the Suez Crisis. Two Wyverns were lost to damage from Egyptian light anti-aircraft fire; the pilots of both aircraft successfully ejected over the sea and were picked up by Eagle's search and rescue helicopter. The squadron returned to the UK on Eagle after this conflict and disbanded in January 1957. Consequently, 813 was the last Wyvern squadron, disbanding on 22 April 1958.

All Wyverns were withdrawn from service by 1958: while in service and testing there were 68 accidents, 39 were lost and there were 13 fatalities, including two RAF pilots and one United States Navy pilot.

== Variants ==
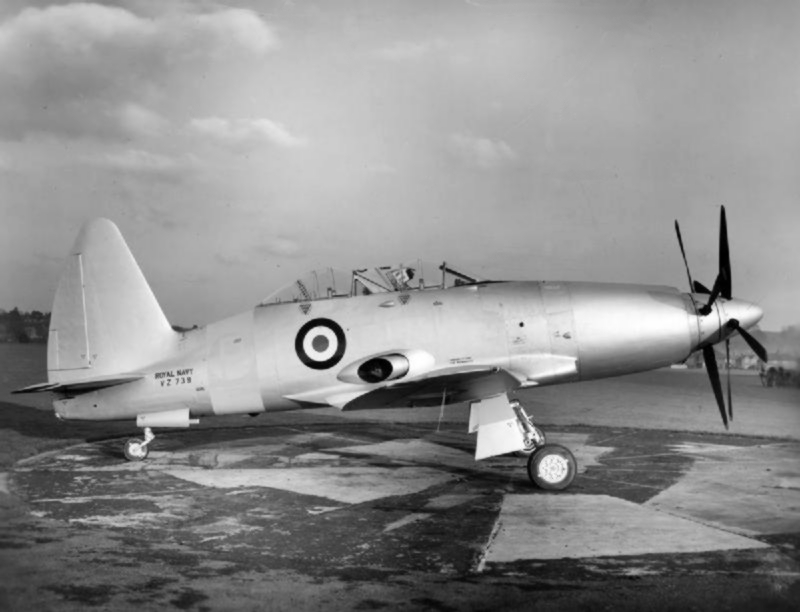
The sole Wyvern T.3, circa 1950

- W.34 Wyvern

Six prototypes ordered in August 1944, with the first aircraft flown 12 December 1946. Powered by the Rolls-Royce Eagle Mk 22 H-block piston engine.

- W.34 Wyvern TF.1

Pre-production aircraft ordered in June 1946, with only seven built of 20 contracted due to the cancellation of the Eagle powerplant.

- W.35 Wyvern TF.2

The original production version, powered by the Armstrong Siddeley Python turboprop in replacement of the discontinued Eagle piston powerplant seen on the W.34 prototypes. Three prototypes were ordered in February 1946 with a production contract for 20 aircraft issued in September 1947. Only nine production aircraft were built, and the remaining eleven were completed as S.4s.

- W.38 Wyvern T.3

Two-seat conversion trainer. One prototype serialed VZ739 was ordered in September 1948 and first flown in February 1950.

- W.35 Wyvern TF.4

The definitive version. 50 were ordered in October 1948, 13 in December 1950, 13 in January 1951 and a final 11 in February 1951. A total of 98 built (including 11 that had started as TF.2s). The model was later redesignated as the S.4.

== Survivors ==
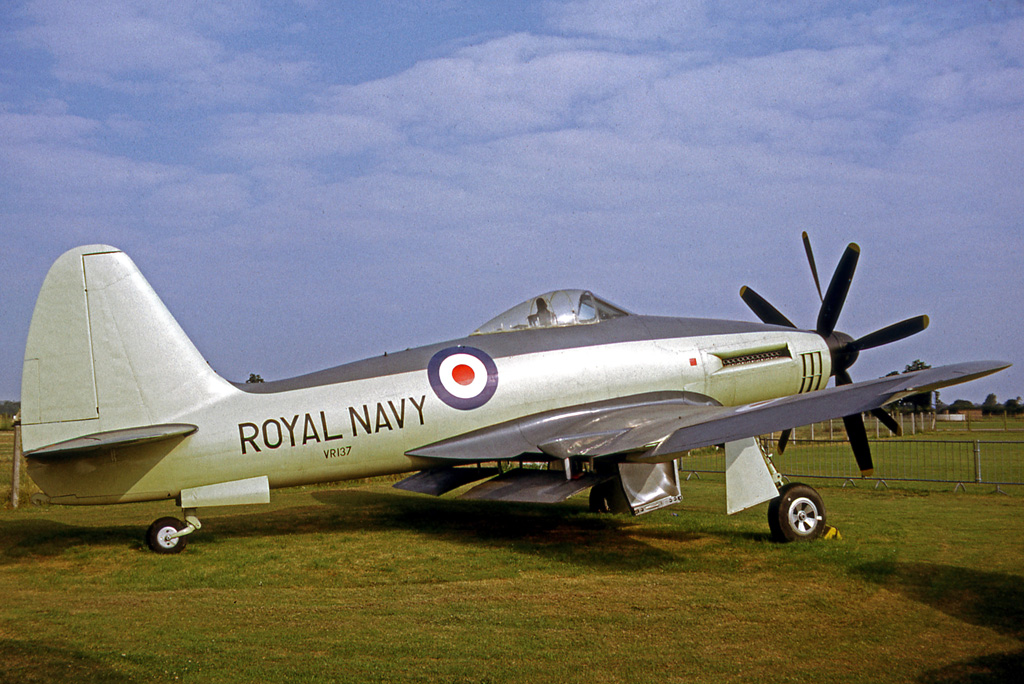
The last remaining Wyvern, a TF.1, exhibited outdoors at the Fleet Air Arm Museum at RNAS Yeovilton in 1971

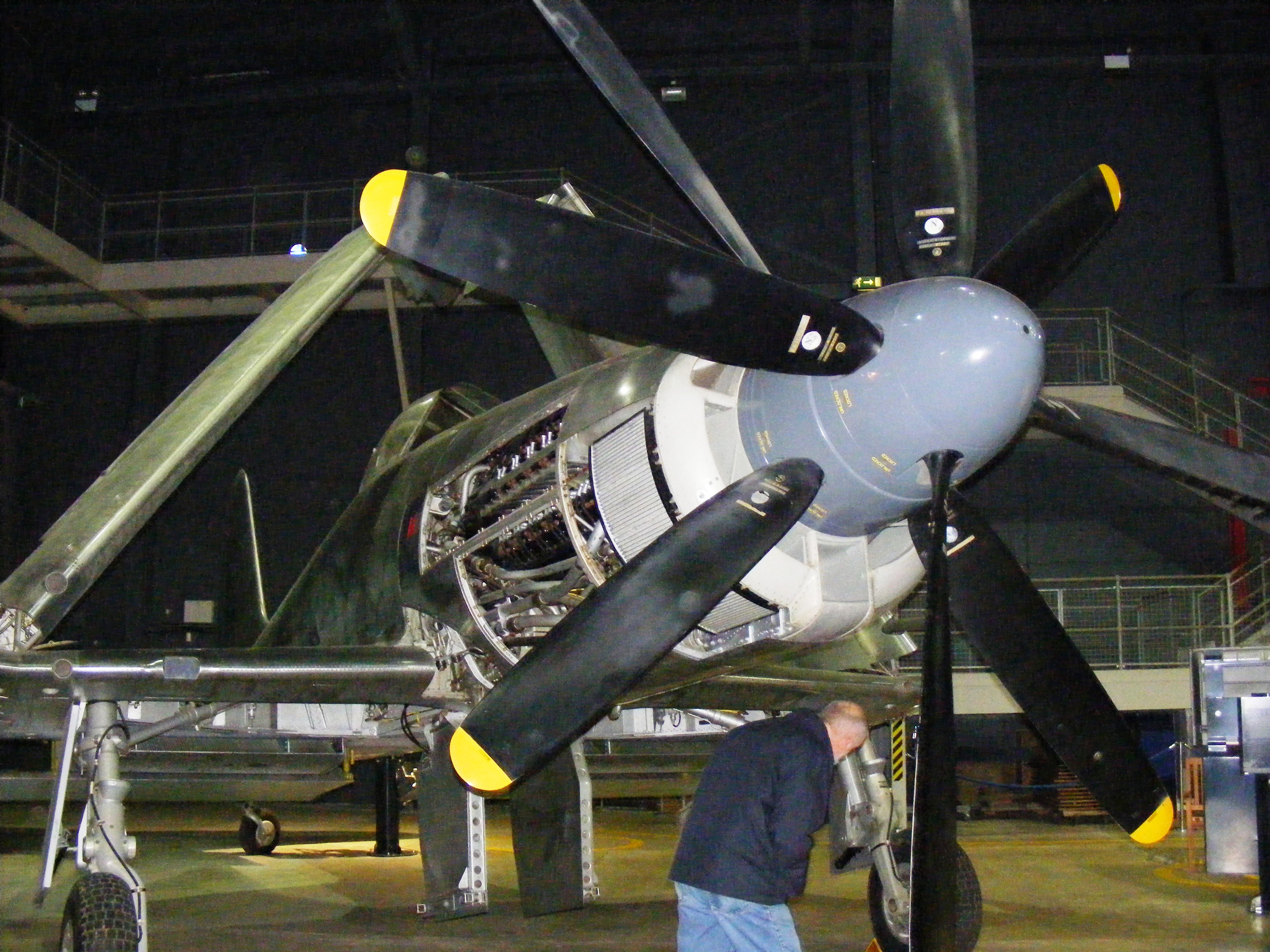
The Wyvern TF.1 at the Fleet Air Arm Museum.

An unflown pre-production aircraft, the last to be fitted with the original Eagle piston engine, (serial number VR137) is on display at the Fleet Air Arm Museum in Yeovilton, England.

== Operators ==
United Kingdom

- Royal Navy Fleet Air Arm
  - 700 Naval Air Squadron (1955-57)
  - 703 Naval Air Squadron (1954-55)
    - 703W Flight (1954)
  - 764 Naval Air Squadron (1955-57)
  - 787 Naval Air Squadron (1954)
  - 813 Naval Air Squadron (1953-55 & 1945-58)
  - 827 Naval Air Squadron (1954-55)
  - 830 Naval Air Squadron (1955-57)
  - 831 Naval Air Squadron (1955-57)
  - Wyvern Conversion Unit at Royal Naval Air Station Ford (1957)

== Specifications (Wyvern S.4) ==
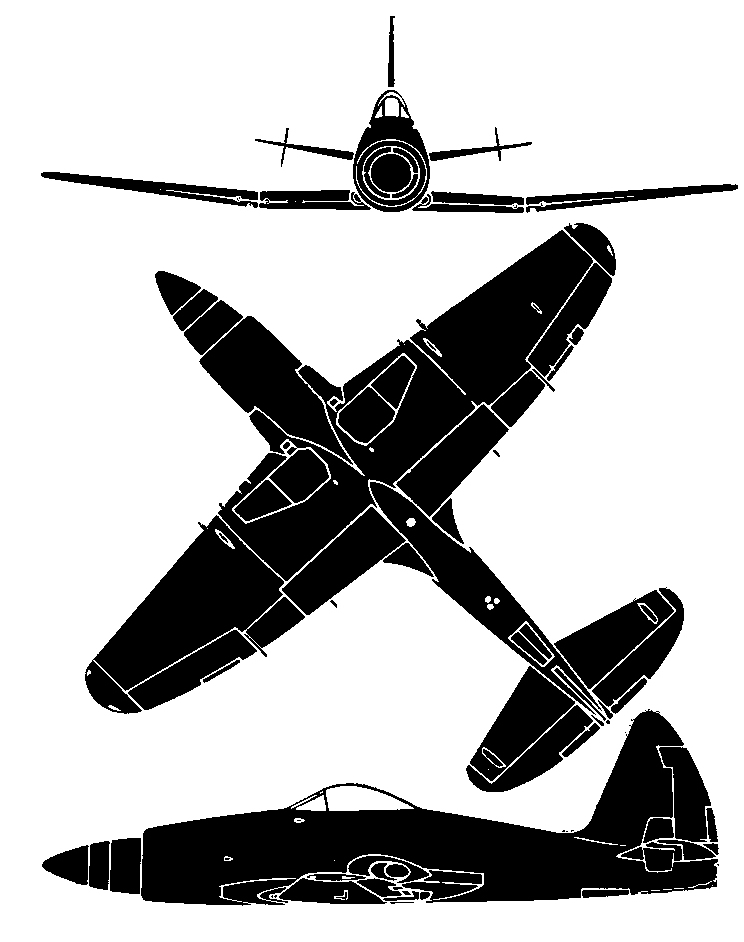

Data from Westland Aircraft since 1915

General characteristics

- Crew: 1 (2 in T.3)
- Length: 42 ft 3 in (12.88 m)
- Wingspan: 44 ft 0 in (13.41 m) (folded 20 ft (6 m)
- Height: 15 ft 9 in (4.80 m) (folded 20 ft (6 m)
- Wing area: 355 sq ft (33.0 m^{2})
- Empty weight: 15,600 lb (7,076 kg)
- Gross weight: 21,200 lb (9,616 kg)
- Max takeoff weight: 24,550 lb (11,136 kg)
- Powerplant: 1 × Armstrong Siddeley Python turboprop engine, 3,560 hp (2,650 kW) +1,100 lbf (4.893 kN) residual thrust
- Propellers: 8-bladed Rotol contra-rotating, 13 ft (4.0 m) diameter

Performance

- Maximum speed: 383 mph (616 km/h, 333 kn) at sea level, 380 mph (610 km/h) at 10,000 ft (3,000 m)
- Range: 910 mi (1,460 km, 790 nmi)
- Service ceiling: 28,000 ft (8,500 m)
- Rate of climb: 2,350 ft/min (11.9 m/s)
- Wing loading: 59.7 lb/sq ft (291 kg/m^{2})
- Power/mass: 0.194 eshp/lb

Armament

- Guns: 4 × 20mm Hispano Mk.V cannon, 2 in each wing
- Rockets: 16 × RP-3 underwing rockets
- Missiles: 1 × Mk.15 or Mk.17 torpedo
- Bombs: Up to 3,000 lb (1,361 kg) of bombs or mines

== See also ==
Aircraft of comparable role, configuration, and era

- Blackburn Firebrand
- Douglas A2D Skyshark
- Fairey Spearfish
- Tupolev Tu-91
