= Curtiss Wanamaker Triplane =

Experimental four-engined triplane flying boat

Curtiss T Wanamaker Triplane
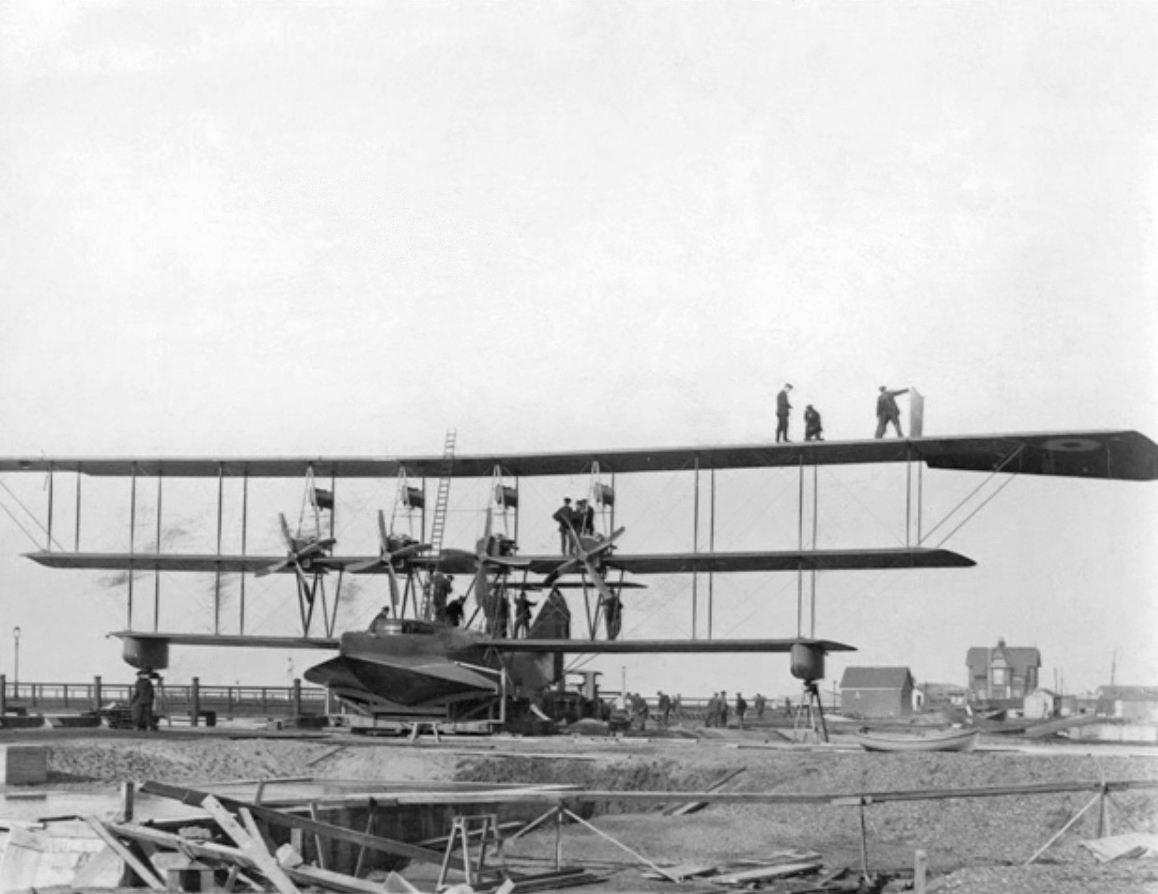
- RNAS Felixstowe, 1916

General information
- Type: Patrol bomber flying-boat
- National origin: United States
- Manufacturer: Curtiss Aeroplane and Motor Company
- Primary user: Royal Naval Air Service
- Number built: 1

History
- First flight: 1916
- Retired: 1916

The Wanamaker Triplane or Curtiss Model T, retroactively renamed Curtiss Model 3 was a large experimental four-engined triplane patrol flying boat of World War I. It was the first four-engined aircraft built in the United States. Only a single example (No.3073) was completed. At the time, the Triplane was the largest seaplane in the world.

== Design and development ==
In 1915, the American businessman Rodman Wanamaker who, prior to the outbreak of the First World War commissioned the Curtiss Aeroplane and Motor Company to build a large flying boat, America to win the £10,000 prize put forward by the British newspaper Daily Mail for the first aircraft to cross the Atlantic, commissioned Curtiss to build a new, even larger flying boat for transatlantic flight that became known as the Wanamaker Triplane, or Curtiss Model T, (retroactively re-designated Model 3 when Curtiss changed its designation system).

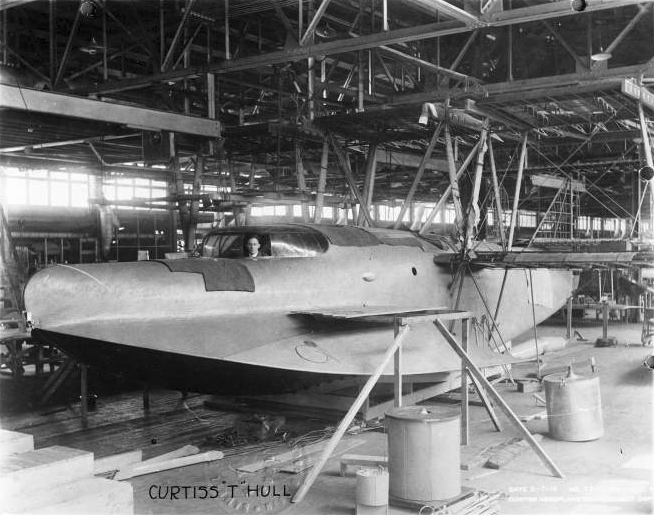
Partially constructed, 5 July 1916.

Early press reports showed a large triplane, 68 ft (17.9 metres) and with equal-span six-bay wings of 133 foot (40.5 metre) span. The aircraft, to be capable of carrying heavy armament, was estimated to have an all-up weight of 21,450 pounds (9,750 kilogrammes) and was to be powered by six 140 hp 104 kW) engines driving three propellers, two of which were to be of tractor configuration and the third a pusher.

The British Royal Naval Air Service (RNAS) placed an order for 20 Triplanes. The first one was completed at the Curtiss factory, Buffalo, New York in July 1916. This was the first four-engined aircraft to be built in the United States and one of the largest aircraft in the world.

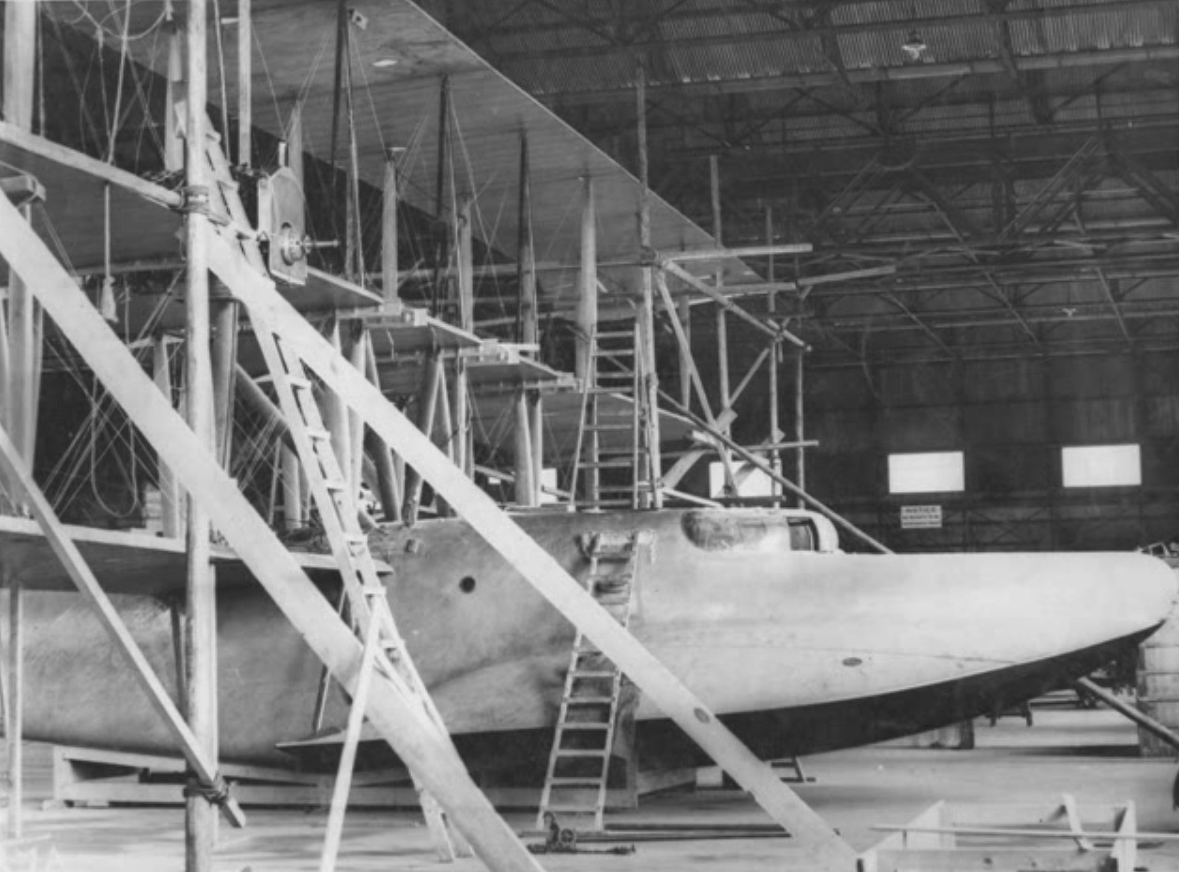
Fitted with a Rolls-Royce engine at RNAS Felixstowe.

The finished Model T differed from the aircraft discussed in the press in various points. Size and weight were similar, with the upper wing having a span of 134 feet, but the other wings had different spans. It was planned to be powered by four tractor 250 hp (187 kW) Curtiss V-4 engines installed individually on the middle wing, which was unusual for the time. The crew of two pilots and a flight engineer were provided with an enclosed cabin, similar to the Curtiss Model H. To reduce the forces a pilot would need to use on the controls, small windmills could be connected to the aileron cables by electrically operated clutches to act as a form of power assisted controls.

As the planned Curtiss V-4 engines were not available when the prototype was completed, it was decided not to fly the aircraft in the United States, but to take it to England by ship. where it was reassembled at the naval air station Felixstowe. Initially it was fitted with four 240 hp (180 kW) Renault engines, but these were soon exchanged for four 250 hp Rolls-Royce Eagles.

As the aircraft was damaged beyond repair on the maiden flight it was considered unsuccessful, and the order for the remaining nineteen cancelled. The Wanamaker Triplane did however, provide the inspiration for John Porte of the Seaplane Experimental Station to build a massive five-engined flying boat of similar layout, the Felixstowe Fury.

== Operators ==
United Kingdom

- Royal Naval Air Service
  - RNAS Felixstowe

== Specifications (Renault engines) ==
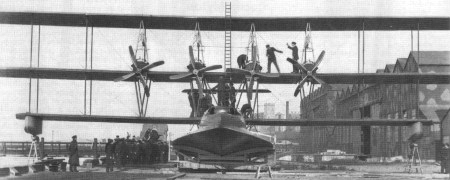
Front elevation of the Model T with four Rolls-Royce engines, RNAS Felixstowe, 1916

Data from Curtiss Aircraft 1907–1947

General characteristics

- Crew: 6
- Length: 58 ft 10 in (17.93 m)
- Upper wingspan: 134 ft (41 m)
- Mid wingspan: 100 ft (30 m)
- Lower wingspan: 78 ft 3 in (23.85 m)
- Height: 31 ft 4 in (9.55 m)
- Wing area: 2,815 sq ft (261.5 m^{2})
- Empty weight: 15,645 lb (7,096 kg)
- Gross weight: 22,000 lb (9,979 kg)
- Powerplant: 4 × Renault 12F V-12 water-cooled piston engines, 240 hp (180 kW) each

Performance

- Maximum speed: 100 mph (160 km/h, 87 kn)
- Range: 675 mi (1,086 km, 587 nmi) at cruise speed of 75 mph
- Endurance: 7 hr
- Time to altitude: 10 minutes to 4,000 ft (1,220 m)

== See also ==
- American Trans-Oceanic Company
- Curtiss NC

Related development

- Curtiss Model H
- Porte Baby
- Felixstowe Fury (Porte Super-Baby)
- Gosport G9

Aircraft of comparable role, configuration, and era

- Sikorsky Ilya Muromets
