= Dornier Do E =

Do E
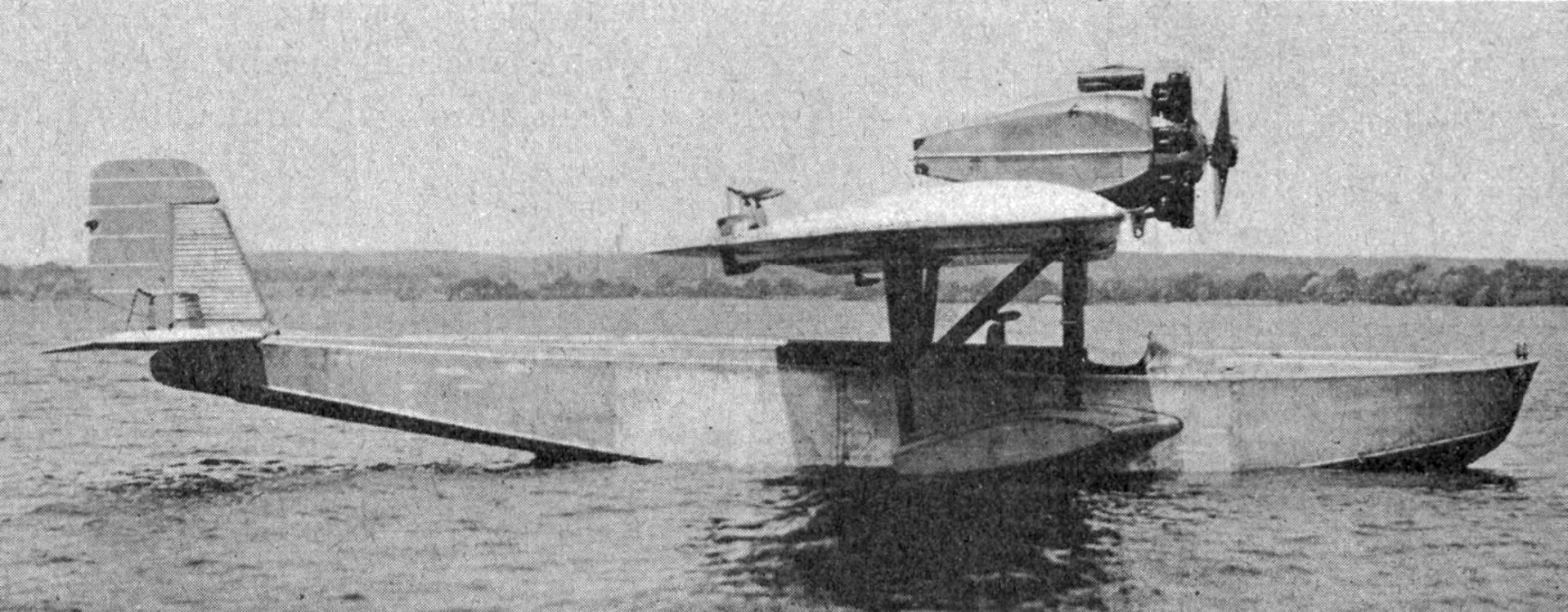

General information
- Type: Do E
- National origin: Germany
- Manufacturer: Dornier Flugzeugwerke
- Number built: 4

The Dornier Do E was a small German flying boat of 1924, designed for reconnaissance missions.

== Development ==
Conceptually, the Do E was very similar to the successful Dornier Wal, but smaller and single-engined. It was of all-metal construction, with a parasol wing that was attached by struts to a wide, shallow hull. The hull had a single step and stability on the water was ensured by the characteristic Dornier sponsons. The single engine was installed on top of the wing centre section, driving a tractor propeller.

The crew accommodation consisted of an open cockpit with two seats side by side, and a position for an observer in the aft fuselage. The Do E could be equipped with a defensive gun or photographic equipment, operated by the observer.

Only four are known to have been completed. Two aircraft with Rolls-Royce Eagle IX engines, known as Do E Is, were exported to Japan and Chile. Two more were built as the Do E II, with Gnome-Rhone Jupiter air-cooled engines. The Do E I was distinguished from the Wal and the Do E II by having a wing covered with metal panels, instead of fabric.

Dornier registered the two Do E II aircraft for the 1926 German contest for seaplanes, but cancelled their participation shortly before the start.

== Specifications (Do E/II) ==
Data from Wasserflugzeuge - Flugboote, Amphibien, Schwimmerflugzeuge, Die deutschen Flugboote : Flugboote, Amphibien-Flugboote u. Projekte von 1909 bis zur Gegenwart

General characteristics

- Crew: 3
- Length: 12.45 m (40 ft 10 in)
- Wingspan: 17.1 m (56 ft 1 in)
- Height: 4.75 m (15 ft 7 in)
- Wing area: 52.9 m^{2} (569 sq ft)
- Empty weight: 1,925 kg (4,244 lb)
- Gross weight: 2,600 kg (5,732 lb)
- Powerplant: 1 × Gnome-Rhône 9A Jupiter 9-cylinder air-cooled radial piston engine, 340 kW (450 hp)
- Propellers: 2-bladed fixed-pitch wooden propeller

Performance

- Maximum speed: 162 km/h (101 mph, 87 kn)
- Alighting speed: 85 km/h (53 mph; 46 kn)
- Range: 1,500 km (930 mi, 810 nmi)
- Service ceiling: 3,600 m (11,800 ft)
