= Felixstowe Fury =

British five-engined triplane flying-boat

F.4 Fury
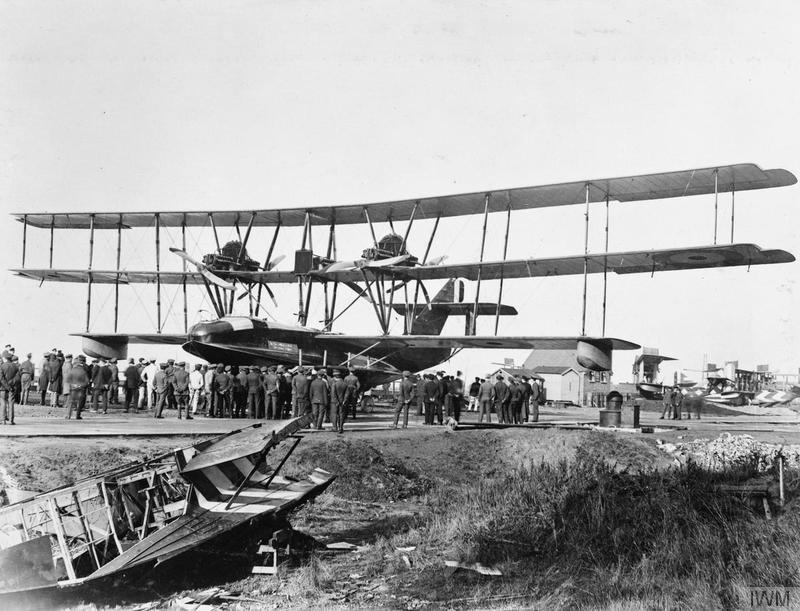
- Fury at the Seaplane Experimental Station, Felixstowe. Wreckage of a Felixstowe F.2A in the foreground.

General information
- Type: Long-range flying-boat
- National origin: United Kingdom
- Manufacturer: Seaplane Experimental Station, Felixstowe
- Designer: John Cyril Porte
- Status: Prototype
- Owners: Admiralty
- Primary user: Royal Air Force
- Number built: 1

History
- First flight: 11 November 1918
- Retired: 11 August 1919
- Developed from: Curtiss Model T Felixstowe F.5

The Felixstowe F.4 Fury (serial N123), also known as the Porte Super-Baby, was a large British, five-engined triplane flying-boat designed by John Cyril Porte at the Seaplane Experimental Station, Felixstowe, inspired by the Wanamaker Triplane/Curtiss Model T. At the time the Fury was the largest seaplane in the world, the largest British aircraft, and the first aircraft controlled successfully by servo-assisted means.

The test-flying programme demonstrated the aircraft's suitability for long-distance flight, however on 11 August 1919 (the eve of a planned flight from England to South Africa) it stalled and crashed into the sea after take-off, killing one member of the crew and suffering irrepairable damage.

== Development ==
Started in early 1917, the Porte Super-baby was a huge aircraft by the standards of the time, with a wingspan comparable to the monoplane flying-boat designs of the 1930s. Construction was superintended by Warrant Officer R. Gowing at Felixstowe. The hull, claimed to have been the best of all Porte's designs, was planked diagonally with cedar wood forming a very wide, slightly concave v-bottom with large fuselage chines. Previous Felixstowe hulls used a straight edged section. Experiments on the effect of different steps in the hull were carried out on a model in the Froude tank at the National Physical Laboratory, first with one, then two and three, finally reverting to two steps.

It was assembled and photographed at Felixstowe as early as 2 October 1918, but delivered on 31 October, with the first flight taking place on the 11th of November with Porte at the controls. Conceived for military purposes and armed with Lewis guns the Fury did not see active duties, its first flight on Armistice Day meant focus was paid to the aircraft's civilian capabilities.

At the Seaplane Experimental Station.

The Fury's unstaggered wings comprised the 3-bay lower wings, mounted near the top of the hull, and a pair of 4-bay upper wings of larger span. All were supported by pairs of vertical struts and diagonal cross-bracing. The original design specified three 600 hp (450 kW) Rolls-Royce Condor engines, but these were not available and five 334 hp (249 kW) Rolls-Royce Eagle VII engines were fitted instead. These were mounted on the middle wing and supported by additional struts, configured as two outboard tandem tractor/pusher (push-pull) pairs and one central pusher. In addition to its triplane wing configuration, the Fury had a biplane tailplane with three rudders, mounted on a single vertical fin similar to the Curtiss triplane. The Fury was initially provided with servo-motors for the main flight control surfaces, designed by Major Arthur Quilton Cooper, but these were removed later without compromising the pilot's ability to control this large aircraft. At some point the engines were replaced with more powerful Eagle VIIIs.

== Operational history ==
With the intense competition in early 1919 to achieve the first transatlantic flight, it was planned to join other teams in the race by shipping the Fury to Cape Broyle, Newfoundland. The intention being a non-stop flight, however the aircraft's size presented a problem as no vessel with a capacity large enough could be found as transport and the project was officially opposed on grounds of expense, despite the crossing being well within the Fury's capabilities; fuel capacity was 1,500 gallons (6,819 litres). On 24 April 1919, the Fury performed a seven-hour flight. Flown initially with a designed weight of 24,000 lb (11,000 kg) its overload weight was 28,000 lb (13,000 kg), and the aircraft performed well at both limits. The Air Ministry's preference to leave the non-stop achievement to a commercial venture, led to the abandonment of the attempt about the third week of May 1919, when flight tests resumed.

The first Atlantic crossing by the Curtiss NC-4 starting 8 May, reached Lisbon 27 May 1919 arriving in Plymouth on the 31st to great fanfare as the first flight from North America (United States, Canada, and Newfoundland) to Great Britain and Ireland. The first non-stop Atlantic crossing by Alcock and Brown followed a few weeks later using a modified Vickers Vimy landing in Clifden, Ireland 15 June.

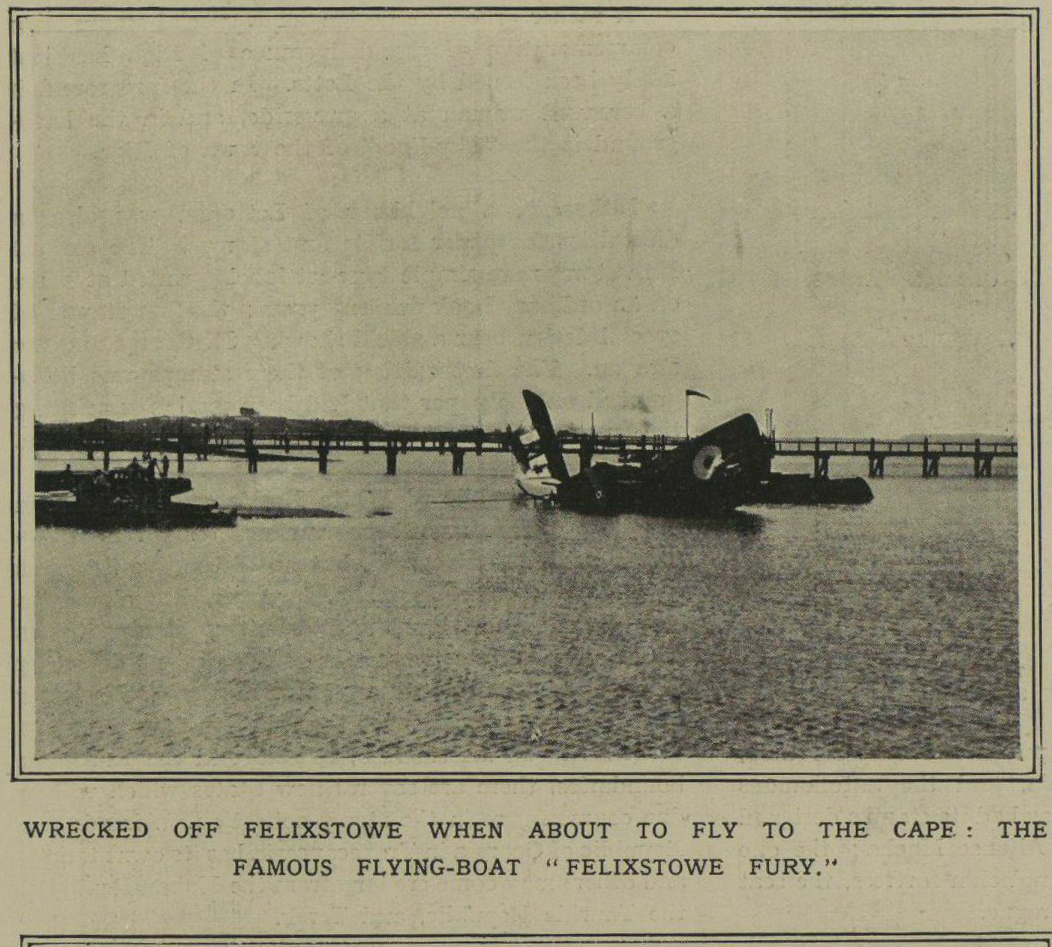
A cutting from The Illustrated London News 16 August 1919, showing wreckage of the Fury being hauled toward a slipway at the Seaplane Experimental Station.

Plans were then made for another long-distance flight, this time for the 8,000-mile (12,875 km) flight from England to Cape Town, South Africa via Gibraltar, Malta, Alexandria, Khartoum, Victoria Nyanza, Lake Tanganyika, Lake Nyassa, Beira and Durban. This was due to start on 12 August 1919 from Plymouth; refuelling and revictualling depots were established throughout the journey supported by detailed meteorological reports. Final preparations were being made on 11 August at Felixstowe when the aircraft side-slipped at low altitude and crashed at 90 mph (145 km/h) shortly after take-off, breaking up on impact. The accident in the harbour, about 500 yards (460 metres) off-shore was witnessed by large crowds of holiday makers.

Despite attempts at rescue, one of the seven-person crew (wireless operator Lt S.E.S. McLeod), remained strapped to his seat and drowned. The surviving crew members rescued by pinnaces were: Officer in charge, Colonel T.S.M. Fellowes, Pilots, Major E.R. Moon and Captain C.L. Scott, chief engineer, Lt J.F. Armitt and mechanics, W/O J.G. Cockburn and W/O H.S. Locker. McLeod's body was recovered after the rescue and the wreck was eventually towed ashore.

The crash was a surprise as the Fury was subject to exhaustive tests in the 12 weeks prior to the flight, surpassing the crews expectations who had every confidence in the aircraft. Flight tests were in accordance with RAF safety margins, however Chief of the Air Staff, Air Vice Marshal Hugh Trenchard regarded the journey as a service reliability test and no details of the project were published.

The Felixstowe Fury was the last aircraft to be designed by Porte at Felixstowe; demobilised, he already left the Royal Air Force working with the Gosport Aircraft Company on their flying boats. Without Porte and Chief Technical Officer John Douglas Rennie to supervise, the Fury may have been loaded incorrectly. Major Moon at the controls apparently left the water before the safe flying speed and with insufficient power left to draw on, the aircraft stalled.

Two months after the Fury's destruction Porte succumbed suddenly to pulmonary tuberculosis, dying on 22 October 1919, aged 35.

== Variants ==
=== Gosport G9 ===
Unrealised commercial version of the Fury designed primarily for carrying mail and valuable cargo long distance over sea or 10-12 passengers and three crew with a loaded weight of 28-29,000 lb, 3100 lbs of cargo.

Fitted with three Rolls-Royce Condor engines in a two tractor and one central pusher configuration - as originally intended for the Fury, two 1000 hp Cosmos Hercules engines or four 450 hp Napier Lion engines in push-pull pairs. The design was similar to Porte's G5 variant of the Felixstowe F.5.

== Operators ==
United Kingdom

- Royal Air Force
  - Seaplane Experimental Station, Felixstowe
  - No. 4 Communications Squadron

== Specifications Fury (at "Medium load") ==
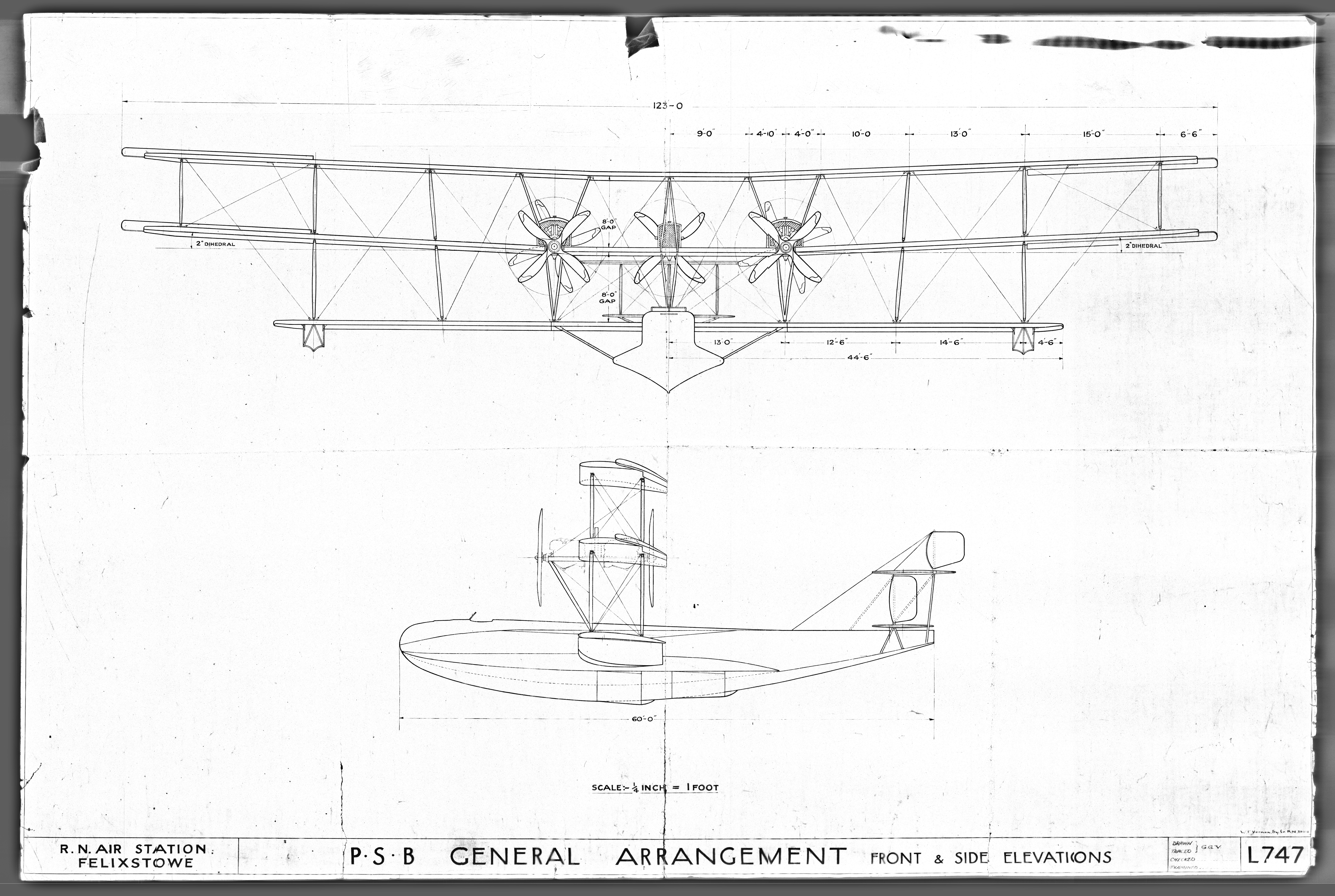
Original RNAS Felixstowe drawing showing the general arrangement of the Felixstowe Porte Super Baby, Fury, or F.4.

Data from Bruce

General characteristics

- Crew: 7
- Capacity: 24-30 (passenger transport)
- Length: 63 ft 2 in (19.25 m)
- Wingspan: 123 ft (37 m)
- Height: 27 ft 6 in (8.38 m)
- Wing area: 3,108 sq ft (288.7 m^{2})
- Empty weight: 18,563 lb (8,420 kg)
- Gross weight: 25,263 lb (11,459 kg)
- Max takeoff weight: 33,000 lb (14,969 kg)
- Powerplant: 5 × Rolls-Royce Eagle VIII V-12 water-cooled piston engines, 334 hp (249 kW) each
- Propellers: 4-bladed fixed-pitch pusher propellers (x3) and 2-bladed tractor propellers (x2)

Performance

- Maximum speed: 97 mph (156 km/h, 84 kn) at 2,000 ft (610 m)
- Service ceiling: 12,000 ft (3,700 m)
- Rate of climb: 353 ft/min (1.79 m/s)
- Time to altitude: 10,000 ft (3,048 m) in28 minutes 20 seconds

Armament

- Guns: At least four Lewis guns (2 bow, 2 dorsal)
- Bombs: not fitted

== See also ==
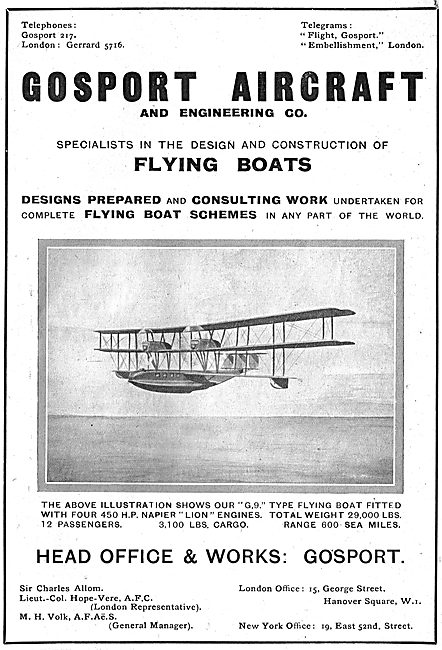
Advertisement featuring the Gosport G9, 7 July 1920.

- Zeppelin-Lindau Rs.I
- Curtiss NC
- Handley Page V/1500 Atlantic
- Sopwith Atlantic
- Tarrant Tabor
- Fairey N.4

Related development

- Porte Baby
- Curtiss Model T
- Felixstowe F.5
- Gosport G9
- Blackburn Iris
- Blackburn Sydney
- Short Sarafand
- Blackburn Perth
