= American Trans-Oceanic Company =

- Founded: 1914; 112 years ago
- Hubs: Port Washington, New York; Palm Beach, Florida
- Headquarters: New York City
- Key people: Rodman Wanamaker; Glen Curtiss; Grover Whalen

American Trans-Oceanic Company was an airline based in the United States.

== History ==
Rodman Wanamaker published a letter in 1916 stating the founding of the American Trans-Oceanic Company to capitalize on the 1914 effort to fly across the Atlantic non-stop. A Curtiss H-16 aircraft was ordered for the company. Wanamaker claimed that if the trans-Atlantic flight could be accomplished once, then it could be accomplished over and over with commercial transports shortly thereafter.

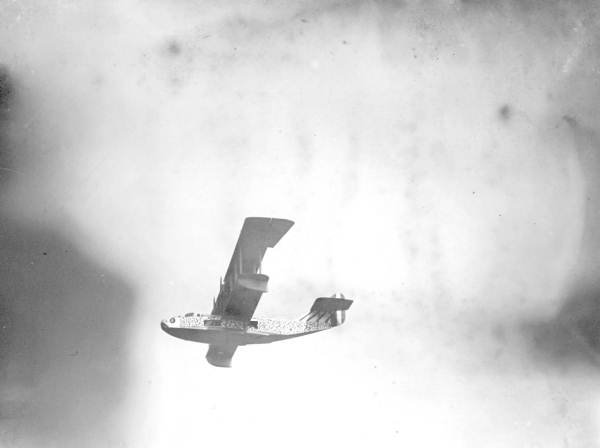
Curtiss H-16 Big Fish overhead

Forming just prior to America's full involvement in World War I, American Trans-Oceanic Company became one of the earliest commercial airlines in the United States. Operations also included a full-time flight school in Long Island and Palm Beach using Curtiss aircraft. New innovations were deployed, such as a Sperry autopilot. Rates varied from $15 for a 15-minute flight to $250 for a 320-mile flight to Cuba. Four five-hour flights a week were flown to Bimini at night. By 1918, the company carried four to five thousand passengers without incident.

The company's most distinctive aircraft was Big Fish, A Curtiss H-16 painted as a fish that flew between Palm Beach, Havana, Nassau, and New York City.

In 1927, Wanamaker sponsored Richard E. Byrd through the American Trans-Oceanic Company to make the Transatlantic attempt again in a Fokker Trimotor, the America. The company put up nearly $150,000 to fund the effort. The aircraft crashed on the attempt to win the Orteig Prize, losing to Charles Lindbergh. The team attempt was accomplished on July 1, 1927, crashing in Ver-sur-Mer.

Wanamaker died in May 1928. Without Wanamaker's involvement, American Trans-Oceanic Company's sponsorships did not continue.

== Destinations ==
Country/Continent

- Havana
- Nassau
- Bimini
- New York City
- Atlantic City
- Newport
- Bar Harbor
- New London
- Boston
- Saratoga Springs
- Lake George
- Albany

== Fleet ==
The American Trans-Oceanic Company fleet consists of the following aircraft as of 1918:

American Trans-Oceanic Company Fleet
Aircraft	Total	Routes	Notes
Curtiss Model F		Short Routes	5-6 place open flying boats
Curtiss H-16		Long Routes	14-16 place flying boats

== Incidents and accidents ==
In January 1917, one of the Twin engine Curtiss flying boats was destroyed when it was torn from its hangar in a gale storm in Long Island. In 1921 the Big Fish, Curtiss H-16 was destroyed in a crash.

== See also ==
- List of defunct airlines of the United States
- Wanamaker Triplane
