= John Cyril Porte =

British aviator

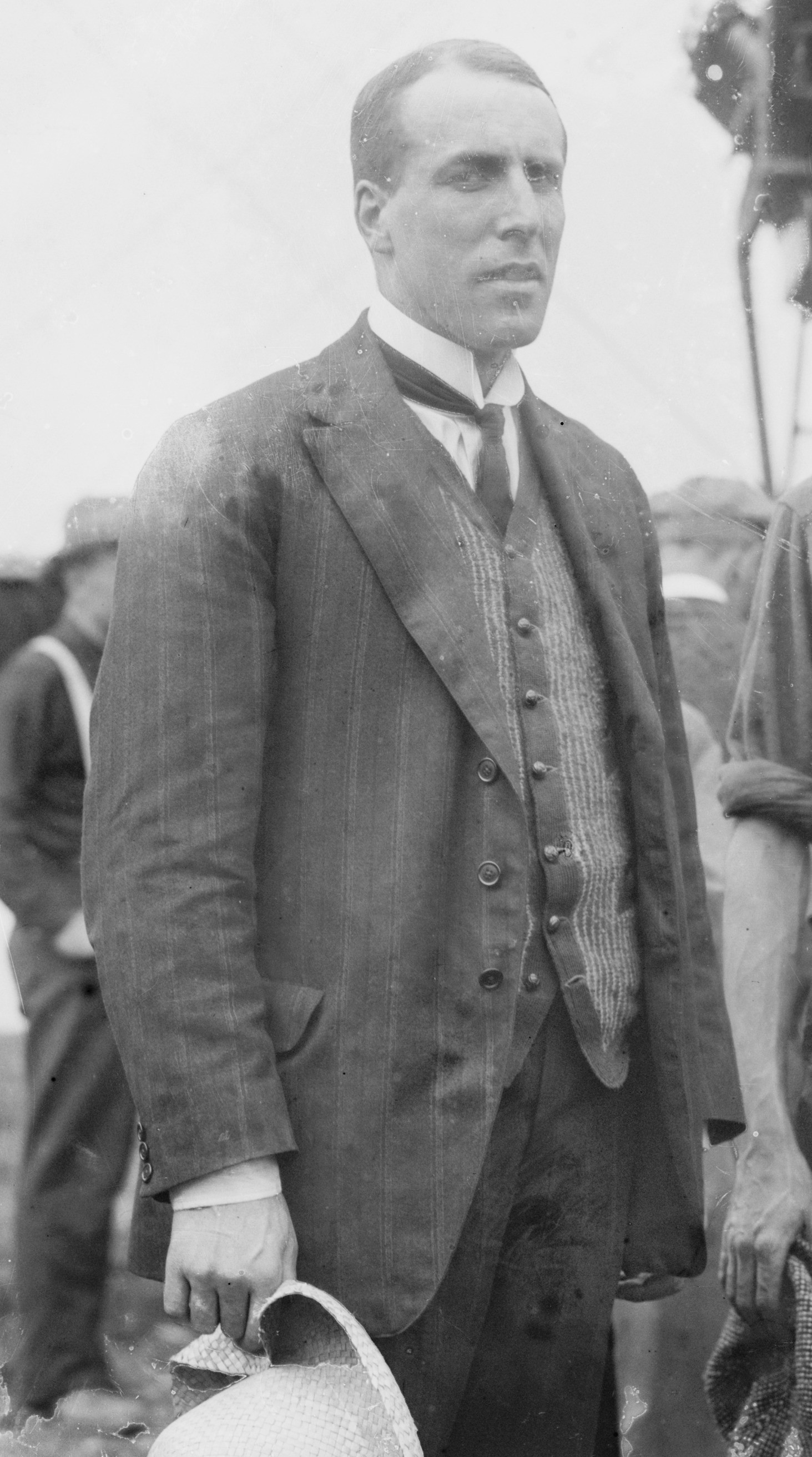
- Porte on 22 June 1914, day of the naming ceremony for Wanamaker's America.
- Born: 26 February 1884; Bandon, County Cork, Ireland
- Died: 22 October 1919 (aged 35); Brighton, England
- Occupations: Inventor; Aviator; Company director
- Known for: Navigation; Air racing Transatlantic flight Seaplane Experimental Station; Anti-submarine warfare Flying boats
- Military career
- Allegiance: United Kingdom of Great Britain and Ireland
- Branch: Royal Navy; British Army; Royal Air Force
- Service years: 1898–1911; 1914–1919
- Conflicts: First World War
- Awards: Companion of the Order of St Michael and St George; Navy Distinguished Service Medal (United States)

Lieutenant Colonel John Cyril Porte, CMG, FRAeS (26 February 1884 – 22 October 1919) was a British flying boat pioneer associated with the First World War Seaplane Experimental Station at Felixstowe.

== Early life and career ==
Porte was born on 26 February 1884 to Reverend John Robert Porte (1849–1922) TCD and Henrietta (née Scott) in Bandon, County Cork, Ireland. Reverend Dr. Porte served as Rector of St Peter's, Ballymodan, Bandon before moving to England with his family as Vicar of St Matthew's church, Denmark Hill in 1890. Rev. Porte's father, George Porte (1819–1892) was a Civil Engineer and master of Erasmus Smith School living in Dublin, a member of the Royal Irish Academy, Fellow of the Royal Geological Society of Ireland and founder member of the Dublin Microscopical Club.

Porte joined the Royal Navy in 1898 age 14, passing through HMS Britannia before he was posted as a midshipman on the training brig HMS Pilot in late September 1902. He served on HMS Royal Oak before he was promoted to lieutenant in 1905. Porte transferred to the Royal Navy Submarine Service in 1906 receiving his training on HMS Thames before HMS Forth and duties on submarines, his first command was HMS B3, beginning 1 January 1908. He served under Murray Sueter, a pioneer of submarines, airships and aeroplanes who encouraged Porte to join that branch of the service.

During 1908 he designed a glider in collaboration with Lieutenant Wilfred Baley Pirie (1888–1960). The glider tested 17 August 1909 from the north side of Portsdown Hill near Portsmouth. Launched using rails like the Wright Brothers, the event featured on the front page of Flight magazine. The aircraft was a staggered wing biplane flown by two pilots simultaneously using a system common to airships; one having control of the rudder and wing warping, the other control of the elevator. The use of staggered planes apparently preceded that of the Goupy. Both officers were attached to the submarine depot at Haslar.

In 1910 he joined HMS Mercury for duties on a Holland-class submarine, taking over HMS C38 on 31 March 1910. It was during his service as a submariner that Porte contracted tuberculosis, being retired as unfit 25 October 1911 with the rank of Lieutenant, RN.

Porte learnt to fly by the end of 1910 using a Santos-Dumont Demoiselle that he built in his spare time; he was also assigned to HMS President in London for a flying course and gained his flying certificate (No. 548) with the Aero Club de France 28 July 1911, flying a Deperdussin monoplane at Reims airfield. Six days prior, Porte took part in the Daily Mail Circuit of Britain from Brooklands with the first British built 60hp Anzani Deperdussin monoplane, but suffered an unfortunate accident shortly after takeoff. He proved to be a gifted and natural pilot.

With Admiral Edmund Fremantle as chairman and Louis Béchereau as Technical Director of the Paris Deperdussin works acting as technical advisor, Porte was test pilot, and joint managing director of the British Deperdussin Company in April 1912 alongside Italian D. Lawrence Santoni, who was already well known in aviation circles and went on to found Savoia. They were the first to establish a British factory for the manufacture of a foreign aircraft; with Porte also as technical director and designer, Frederick Koolhoven joined them from France as chief engineer and works manager in the summer of 1912. Porte invested nearly all his money in the venture.

He flew Deperdussin aircraft in the Military Aeroplane Trials at Larkhill and air races at Hendon Aerodrome, where he became a popular figure with the weekend crowds, by now achieving a considerable reputation as a skilled pilot. About November 1912 Porte was a director of British Anzani alongside Captain John Crosby Halahan, a former Royal Dublin Fusiliers and Royal Flying Corps (RFC) officer, Waldo Ridley Prentice and Claude Scholfield, with Santoni as chairman. Halahan was appointed manager of the Deperdussin Flying School at Hendon in 1913.

Porte tested the British Deperdussin Seagull float plane successfully at Osea Island about June 1913; around this time he was recovering from a serious operation to his jaw. During the collapse and liquidation of Deperdussin from about August 1913, Porte lost all his investments. Following he was employed by White & Thompson as a designer and test pilot.

He married Minnie 'Betty' Miller at St James's Church, Piccadilly on 16 August 1916.

== Transatlantic challenge ==
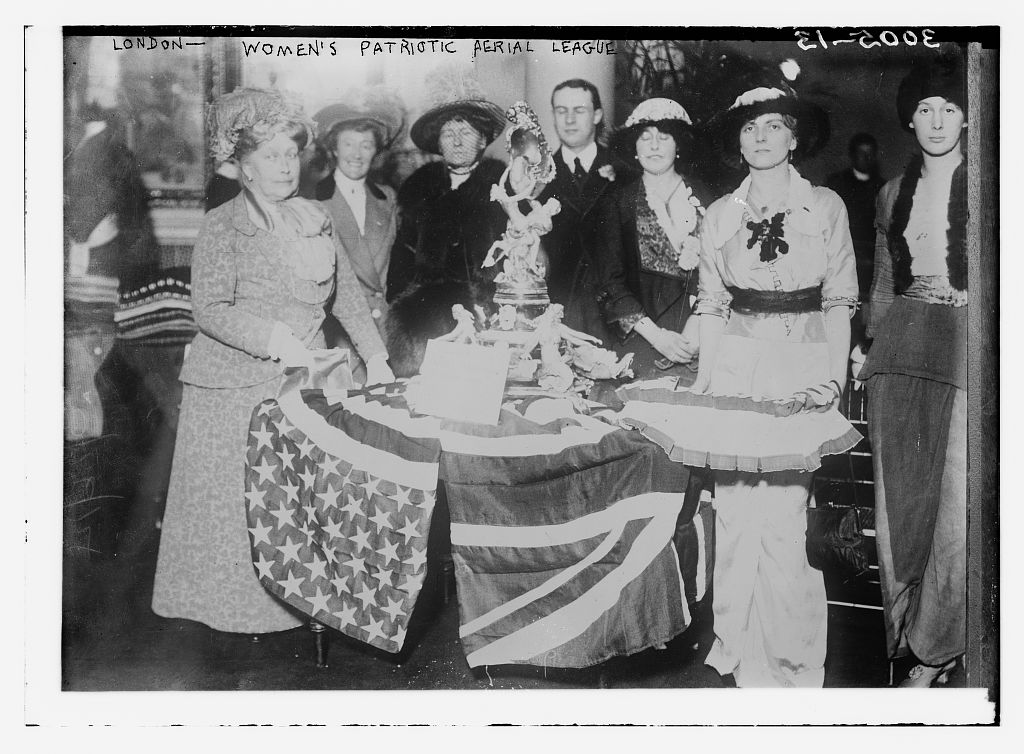
London early 1914, the Woman's Aerial League silver trophy and $5,000 prize.

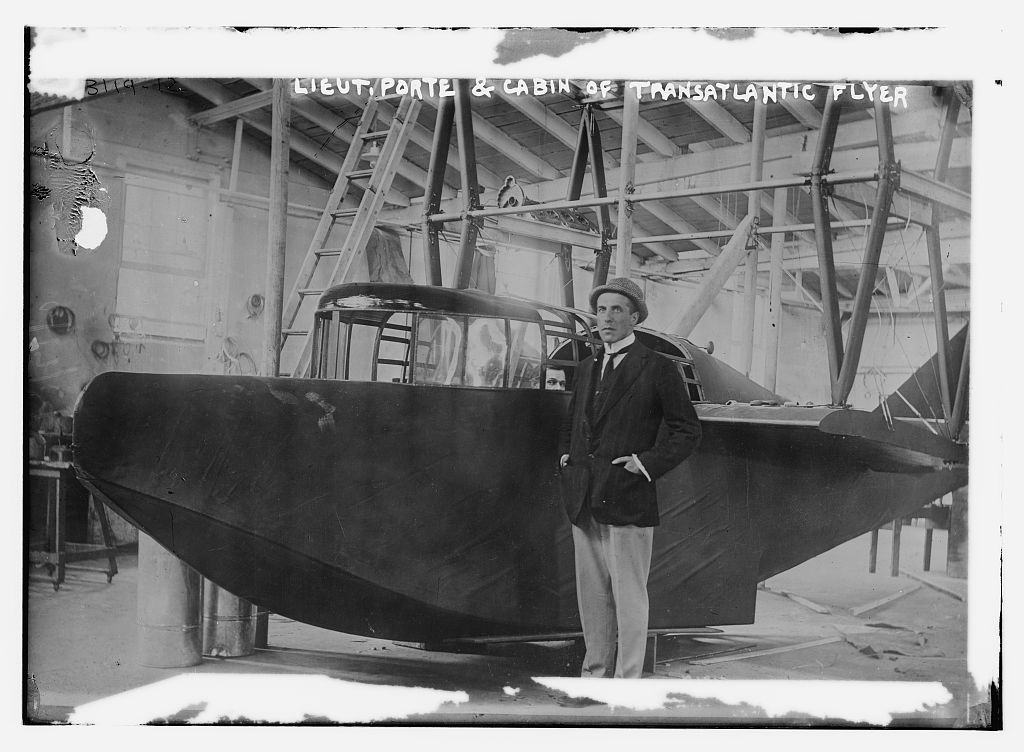
In the Curtiss factory with the second prototype designed under Porte's supervision; appearing in The Sun 18 June 1914, "The latest photographs of the Wanamaker seaplane. Lieut. Porte standing by the machine."

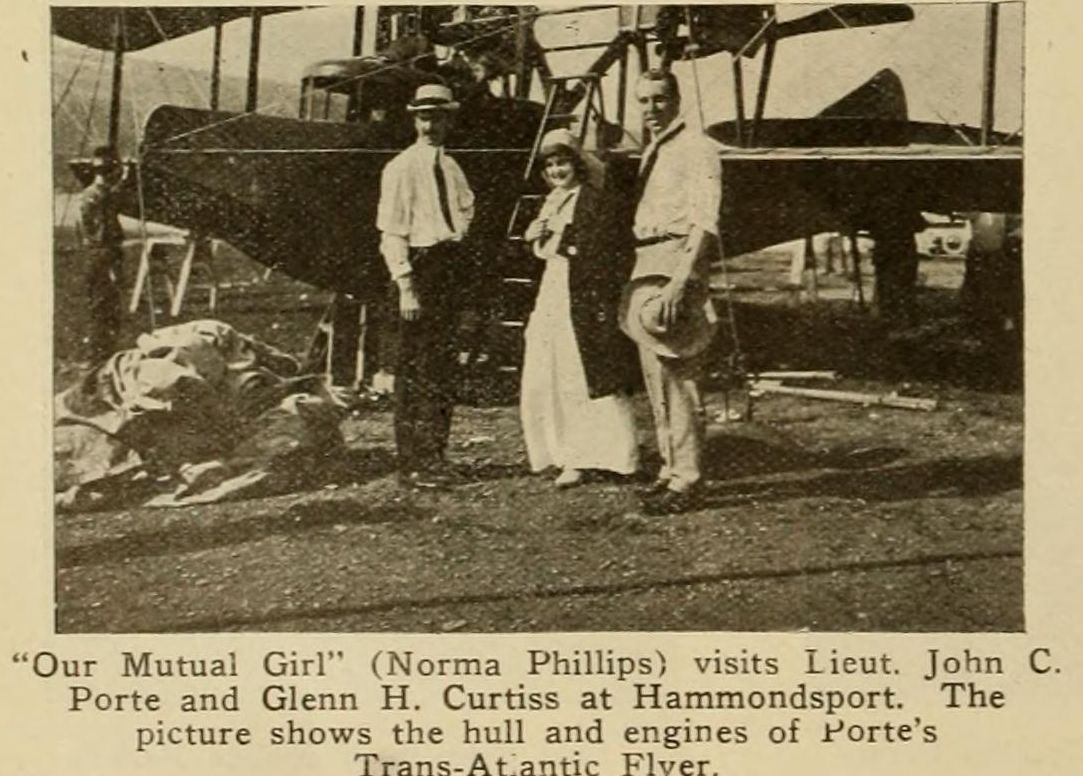
A cutting from Moving Picture World 25 July 1914: Glen Curtiss, actress Norma Phillips (Our Mutual Girl) and Porte with his characteristic straw hat in front of the Trans-Atlantic Flyer.

About 1911 Porte met American aircraft designer Glenn Curtiss and proposed a partnership to produce an aircraft to compete in the Daily Mail prize for the first transatlantic crossing. In 1912 Curtiss produced the two-seat Flying Fish that was classified as a flying boat because the hull sat in the water; it featured an innovative notch or "step" in the hull that Porte recommended for breaking clear of the water on takeoff.

Pursuing his interest in flying boats, over October 1913 Porte met Curtiss with Eric Gordon England at George Volk's Seaplane Base on Brighton sea front, where the Curtiss flying boat was demonstrated. In January 1914 Porte was engaged in building improved Curtiss flying boats for White & Thompson with a flying school to support the enterprise.

Widely publicised, Porte and Curtiss then worked together on a design at Hammondsport, New York, US between February and August 1914, commissioned and funded by American businessman Rodman Wanamaker for a prototype flying boat with which they intended to cross the North Atlantic Ocean and win a $50,000 cash prize put up by the Daily Mail, supported by Lord Northcliffe; in connection with the London, Anglo-American Exhibition beginning 14 May 1914, Victoria Woodhull Martin announced a further $5,000 and silver trophy on behalf of the Woman's Aerial League of Great Britain, 4 February 1914.

Porte was to fly and navigate the aircraft with co-pilot and engineer George Hallett. The route selected was much longer than a direct flight, at reduced risk and planned to start 20 July from St. John's, Newfoundland to the Azores, 1,198 miles distant for re-fuelling and on to Plymouth, stopping en route at Vigo in northern Spain.

By 20 May 1914 the official contenders for the prize were Irishman Porte, and Englishman Gustav Hamel with a British built prototype Martinsyde monoplane funded by Canadian businessman Mackay Edgar. Edgar retired from the competition 25 May 1914 following Hamel's disappearance over the English Channel 23 May, withdrawing entirely on 18 June. The commencement of hostilities stopped Wanamaker's plan on 4 August 1914 when the United Kingdom of Great Britain and Ireland declared war on Germany and Porte, leaving with nothing but his clothes, boarded Lusitania at New York bound for Liverpool.

== War service ==
His health notwithstanding, two days after returning to England he was recommissioned in the Royal Naval Air Service as lieutenant commander and posted 13 August 1914 as Squadron Commander in charge of pilot training at Hendon Aerodrome, requisitioned from Claude Graham White on 4 August under the Defence of the realm Act.

Captain Murray Sueter, now Director of the Admiralty Air Department was looking for a suitable aircraft to combat the German U-boat and Zeppelin forces in the North Sea. By March 1915 Porte convinced Sueter to purchase Curtiss H-4 flying boats, a military version of their earlier twin 100 horsepower America flying boat design, and permitted the assistant U.S. naval attache to London, Lieutenant John H. Towers, to fly RNAS aircraft on a regular basis between 1914 and 1916. These early flying boats did not have sufficient power, and the naval station at Felixstowe soon replaced their Curtiss engines with Anzani 10-cylinder powerplants. More Curtiss aircraft were ordered, but their 160 hp Curtiss engines were deemed unsatisfactory and replaced with 250 hp Rolls-Royce Falcon engines, being known as H-12s or Large Americas.

Once the project was under way, Porte assisted with the assembly and testing of the America flying boats at RNAS Felixstowe; he was officially posted to Felixstowe in September 1915 as commander of the Experimental Flying Wing where he would frequently fly on offensive patrols to gather what was required of the aircraft.

His first design implemented at Felixstowe was the Porte Baby, a large, three-engined biplane flying-boat powered by one central pusher and two outboard tractor Rolls-Royce Eagle engines. Between November 1915 and 1918, it was the largest flying boat built and flown in the United Kingdom.

Porte modified a Curtiss H-4 (No.3580) with Hispano-Suiza engines and a new hull whose improved hydrodynamic qualities made taxiing, take-off and landing much more practical, and renamed it the Felixstowe F.1. He then modified the hull of the larger Curtiss H-12 flying boat, creating the Felixstowe F.2, that was greatly superior to the original Curtiss boat. Under Porte's supervision, the Naval and Seaplane Experimental Station continued to enlarge and improve the design of the Felixstowe aircraft independently of Curtiss, through the F.3 and the F.5; Porte's last design to be built was the 123 ft-span five-engined Felixstowe Fury triplane (also known as the "Porte Super-Baby" or "PSB"), largest seaplane in the world and largest British aircraft at the time.

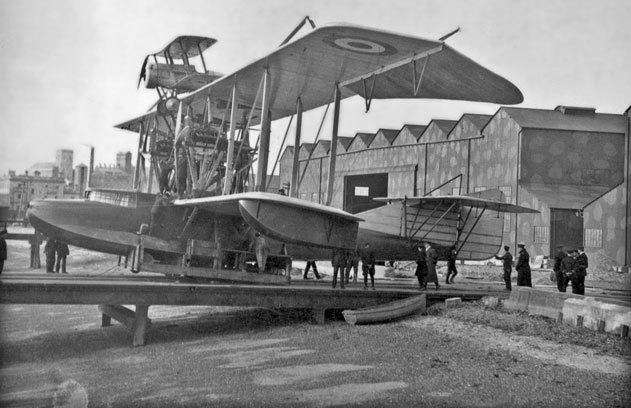
Bristol Scout C (C3028) from HMS Vindex atop Porte Baby (No.9800), RNAS Felixstowe, May 1916, Porte walking under the tailplane.

The Felixstowes were mainly used on long-range patrols to look for the High Seas Fleet or submarines of the Imperial German Navy. However, the aircraft were also initially used successfully to intercept Zeppelins. To avoid this danger, Zeppelins were forced to fly higher, resulting in Porte developing the first composite aircraft experiments in 1916, with a Porte Baby carrying a small Bristol Scout fighter piggyback. The flying boat would provide the long range, while the fighter would be able to climb rapidly to engage the enemy. With Porte at the controls of the flying boat, on 17 May 1916 Flight Lieutenant M. J. Day successfully flew the Baby launch craft over Harwich in its one and only trial flight, and, although on this occasion the parasite was successfully released, the scheme was abandoned as impractical for North Sea conditions.

Several hundred seaplanes of Porte's design were built for war-time patrolling of the east coast of England, for naval reconnaissance around the Mediterranean Sea, and were even sold to the US for coast patrols. Armed with torpedoes and depth charges, they could attack ships and U-boats. A measure of the success of Porte's work is that the Curtiss Aeroplane and Motor Company manufactured the F.5 as the F5L and Aeromarine 75.

Seaplane lighter and Curtiss H-12 flying boat.

Acutely aware of the flying boat's limitations, Porte pioneered the use of a small towing lighter with a planing hull to increase its effective range. The lighter was designed to be "trimmed down" with water ballast to enable the flying boat to taxi up on to the deck. Once the flying boat was in place, it was picked up by a destroyer and towed to the release area at 30 kts. The aircraft was then recovered.

Porte extended this technique for Colonel Samson, Officer commanding RNAS Great Yarmouth. A thirty-foot deck was added to the seaplane lighter with a Sopwith Camel single-seat fighter held down with a quick release system. The first trial with Samson as pilot failed; at the moment of release, the aircraft lifted off at the wrong angle and stalled into the sea. Despite the setback, both Samson and Porte were convinced the scheme would work, so a lighter pilot was selected. On 11 August 1918 Lieutenant S. D. Culley took off successfully from lighter H5 towed by HMS Redout. Culley intercepted and destroyed Zeppellin L 53 at the peak of the fighter's ceiling, rendezvoused with the destroyer and ditched his aircraft alongside the lighter. Restored seaplane lighter H21, built 1918 is held in the Fleet Air Arm Museum collection.

During Porte's tenure at Felixstowe, due to the reorganisation of the different aerial services, he received various naval, RNAS and Royal Air Force ranks, and was known variously as lieutenant commander, wing commander and lieutenant colonel. He was pensioned with the rank of colonel.

Porte was also President of the RNAS Felixstowe Sports Committee.

== Profiteering trial ==
On 25 July 1917, while he was engaged in his large flying boat design, Porte, William Augustus Casson (age 63), Lyman J. Seeley and other persons were indicted in London's Bow Street Magistrates' Court on charges of profiteering under the Prevention of Corruption Act 1906. Following questions in the Houses of Parliament a Committee of Inquirey was appointed by Sir Edward Carson, then First Lord of the Admiralty, chaired by barrister and member of parliament John George Butcher. Casson and Porte were examined before the committee during the early months of 1917, but there was apparently no exchange of correspondence between the committee, Curtiss publicity manager Seely or Glen Curtiss.

The case was high-profile; Sir John Dickinson presiding, Sir Archibald Bodkin and the Attorney General, Sir Frederick Smith represented Director of Public Prosecutions, Charles Willie Mathews, assisted by H. D. Roome (co-author of Archbold) and Mr Branson, both the Attorney General and Director of Public Prosecutions were present in Court. Walter Joseph Synott and Patrick Hastings argued for Casson; Porte's solicitor Sir George Lewis (son of Sir George Lewis) instructed Richard David Muir and Ellis Hume-Williams.

During his time at Hammondsport before the war, Porte arranged with Seely, then Curtiss sales manager, to receive as an agent, 20–25% commission on all Curtiss flying boats that he sold after the projected trans-Atlantic flight. At the time of his hasty return from the United States in August 1914, Porte's connections with the Curtiss company had not been fully and legally dissolved; Porte continued to receive monies secretly through Casson as a commission agent between August 1914 and 24 July 1917, when he was in the position of ordering aircraft on behalf of the Navy and was accused of receiving £48,000 in this manner. On 19 November 1917 Casson admitted guilt but, on return of the money, the Attorney General entered a plea of nolle prosequi against Porte in light of his failing health and important war service. Dropping the charges was seen by The Crown as a way of removing any stigma from Porte's name and reputation as a public servant, but the authorities refused any payment for his inventions.

Seeley did not appear, remaining at Hammondsport in the United States; the embarrassment of the case led to his dismissal, but with no lasting financial implications. The nervous strain of the proceedings combined with the onerous commitments at Felixstowe had an adverse effect on Porte's already poor state of health, the circumstances making it very difficult to mount a proper defense; he was taken ill toward the end of the second hearing and remained for a period at the Russell Hotel in the advanced stages of chronic pulmonary tuberculosis; proceedings continued in his absence until the final hearing at the Old Bailey. The distinguished Casson, a retired civil servant and barrister living in Bedford Park, was 'persuaded' to plead guilty so the trial could be brought to a swift conclusion and reprimanded by the sentencing judge, Henry McCardie. His health gravely impaired, Porte returned to Felixstowe where he was nursed to recovery by his wife.

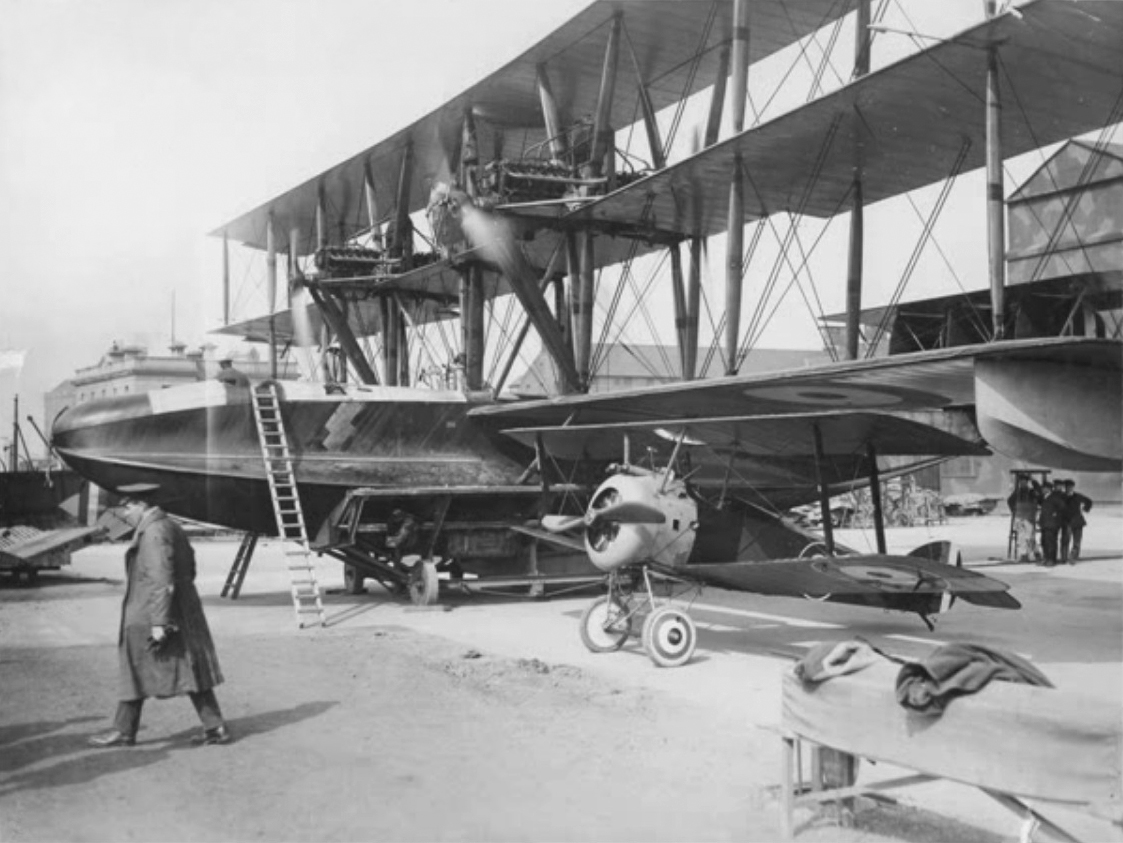
Felixstowe Fury with revised tailplane and Sopwith Camel comparison at the Seaplane Experimental Station, Felixstowe early 1919, Porte in the foreground.

In November 1917 Porte was recommended for the Distinguished Service Order, but this was refused at the highest level: "In view of the special circumstances of this officer's case the First Lord is not prepared to consider any decoration for past services". He was however, promoted to captain, RN and put in charge of all operational squadrons at RNAS Felixstowe in addition to the Experimental Wing. On 26 February 1918 (Porte's birthday), King George V made a special visit to the base to see Porte's work first hand and personally present medals to the station aircrew. His attention restored, Porte returned to work on the "PSB" with the assistance of his Chief Technical Officer, Squadron Commander J. D. Rennie, later chief designer of Blackburn Aircraft Company.

Porte was appointed a Companion of the Order of St Michael and St George in the 1918 Birthday Honours "in recognition of distinguished services rendered in connection with the War". He was elected a Fellow of the Royal Aeronautical Society in July 1918 for his design work.

== Later life ==
Demobilised from the RAF, and still very sick, Porte joined the Gosport Aircraft Company in August 1919 as chief designer; it was hoped that there would be progressive developments as he agreed to use his recent patents that were very forward looking, one incorporating a ski or hydrofoil. These designs gave him the idea of lifting hydrofoils and an appointment was arranged with Lord Northcliffe who expressed an interest. The meeting was brokered by Air Commodore R. M. Groves (an RNAS contemporary) for the end of October 1919, who in a letter described the invention "As incredible as the Ironship or Telephone in their day". It was also hoped the company would convert the many war surplus 'F' type flying boats for civil use.

Before his death Porte produced a series of flying boat designs for commercial purposes, offering considerable improvements and modification of the proven types developed during the war including the G9, a trans-ocean passenger and cargo version of the Felixstowe Fury, however partly through lack of Government interest and adequate finance, none of the new designs were realised.

Worn out with overwork and worry, his illness taking over his worn out body, Porte died suddenly in Brighton, East Sussex, of pulmonary tuberculosis on 22 October 1919, age 35; he was buried in Brighton and then re-interred in June 1920 at West Norwood Cemetery alongside his mother and three of his brothers who pre-deceased him. His monument is a cross and anchor with an epitaph, "Colonel Porte was the inventor of the British flying boats."

== Legacy ==
Even into his last moments, Porte was thinking and talking about his future ideas; at the time of his death, there was a sense of real loss in the aviation world. C. G. Grey, Editor of The Aeroplane, stated in a long obituary, "The history of John Cyril Porte is a tragedy relieved by the example of indomitable will and loyalty which he has set to all who serve the King. Few have suffered more and none have done better work in spite of physical and mental suffering".

Walter Raleigh in his book The War in the Air summed up the importance of Porte's work during the First World War: "The shortest possible list of those who saved the country in its hour of need would have to include his name."

In recognition of his pioneering work, on 19 September 1919 shortly before his death, Porte was awarded the U.S. Navy Distinguished Service Medal by Josephus Daniels, Secretary of the Navy on behalf of the President of the United States, Woodrow Wilson. The award was announced posthumously in the London Gazette 12 December 1919 with some of Porte's contemporaries in the Royal Navy and RAF who also received the Distinguished Service Medal from the United States: Sir Godfrey Marshall Paine, Arthur Vyell Vyvyan, Charles Laverock Lambe, Robert Marsland Groves and Edward Maitland Maitland.

In 1922 Porte was recognised for an award from the Royal Commission on Awards to Inventors in relation to flying boats and later his widow received an award of £1500.00 from the Commission in respect of information passed to the US Government concerning inventions, designs, etc. in relation to aircraft and aircraft accessories, specifically flying boats.

All the Short Brothers flying boats that followed between 1930 and 1950 owe much to Porte's work.

== See also ==
- RAF Coastal Area
- Transatlantic flight
- John Alcock - British commander of the first non-stop transatlantic flight (1919)
- Albert Cushing Read - U.S. commander of the first transatlantic flight (1919)
- John Rodgers - U.S. commander of first flight to Hawaii (1925)

Military offices
Preceded by G. C. Cayley	Officer Commanding; RNAS Felixstowe ?–31 March 1918	None; Group reformed as Seaplane Experimental Station
Military offices
New title Group established	Officer Commanding; Seaplane Experimental Station, Felixstowe; 1 April 1918 – June 1919	None; Group disbanded
