= George E. A. Hallett =

British-American aviator (1890–1982)

George Eustace Amyot Hallett
- Hallett in June 1914.
- Born: George Eustace Amyot Hallett; May 9, 1890; Cheltenham, England
- Died: June 2, 1982 (aged 92); San Diego, California, US

Colonel George Eustace Amyot Hallett (May 9, 1890 – June 2, 1982) was a pioneer aviator. He and John Cyril Porte planned to make the first transatlantic flight. They were going to use a flying boat commissioned by Rodman Wanamaker, but were prevented by the start of World War I. In 1919 the transatlantic flight of Alcock and Brown set the record that they hoped to achieve.

== Biography ==
He was born on May 9, 1890, in Cheltenham, England, to Marmaduke James Hallett, of England, and Alida Clara Bealy, of Christchurch, New Zealand. He had a sibling, Mary Amiet Hallet.

He migrated from England to the United States with his parents in December 1890 when he was six months old. They settled in San Diego, California.

When he finished his ninth grade education, he left home and worked for a commercial fisherman named Elmer Clap.

He worked as an apprentice for the Baker Machine Company in San Diego. There he repaired boat and automobile engines.

He then worked as a mechanic for Harold Fowler McCormick.

With John Cyril Porte they planned to be the first to fly across the Atlantic Ocean. They were to use Wanamaker's America flying boat.

He died on June 2, 1982, in San Diego, California.

== Legacy ==
His papers are archived at the San Diego Air and Space Museum.

== Publications ==
- Superchargers And Supercharging Engines in the Journal of the American Society of Naval Engineers Volume 32, Issue 3, pages 596–604, August 1920
- Airplane motors: A course of practical instruction in their care and overhauling for the use of military aviators by George Eustace Amyot Hallett
