= Felixstowe Porte Baby =

British reconnaissance flying boat

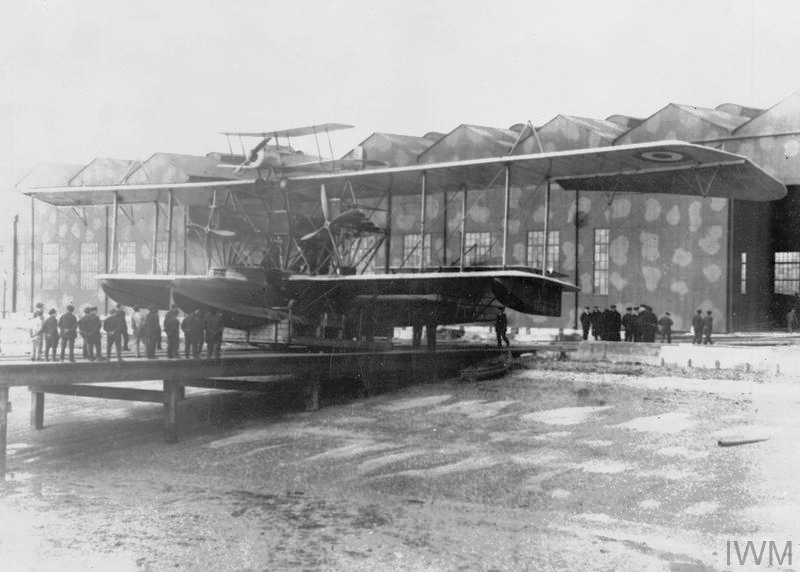
- Porte Baby (No.9800) carrying a Bristol Scout (C3028), RNAS Felixstowe

General information
- Type: Military flying boat
- National origin: United Kingdom
- Manufacturer: RNAS Felixstowe (1); May, Harden and May (10)
- Designer: John Cyril Porte
- Primary users: Royal Naval Air Service Royal Air Force
- Number built: 11

History
- Introduction date: November 1916
- First flight: 20 November 1915

The Felixstowe Porte Baby (also known as the Porte F.B.2) was a British reconnaissance flying boat of the First World War, first flying in 1915.

== Design and development ==
The Porte Baby was designed by John Cyril Porte RN at the naval air station, Felixstowe where the prototype was also built; ten more were made by May, Harden and May of Southampton. Between November 1915 and 1918 it was the largest flying boat built and flown in the United Kingdom.

The aircraft was an unequal-span, three-bay biplane of wood-and-fabric construction, the hull being mounted below the lower wing. The engines, normally three Rolls-Royce Eagles, (but sometimes with a 260 hp Green as the centre, pusher engine) were mounted between the wings; two in tractor configuration and the central one in pusher. The two pilots were in an enclosed cockpit, the three gunners had open stations armed with machine guns.

The incongruously-named Baby was used to prove the concept of a larger aircraft carrying aloft and launching a lighter aircraft – in this case a Bristol Scout – taking off carrying the Bristol and successfully releasing it on 17 May 1916, a technique which came to be known variously as 'composite' or 'parasitic'.

== Operational history ==
The production Porte Babies were used to fly patrols over the North Sea from Felixstowe, RNAS Killingholme, Houton Bay, Orkney and Catfirth, Shetland. Its slow speed and large size, however, made it vulnerable to fighter attack, and after one aircraft was almost destroyed by German aircraft, being forced down and having to taxi back from off the Dutch coast to England, the Portes were kept from patrolling areas where they could encounter enemy aircraft. The Porte Baby remained in service during October 1918.

== Operators ==
United Kingdom

- Royal Naval Air Service
- Royal Air Force

== Specifications ==
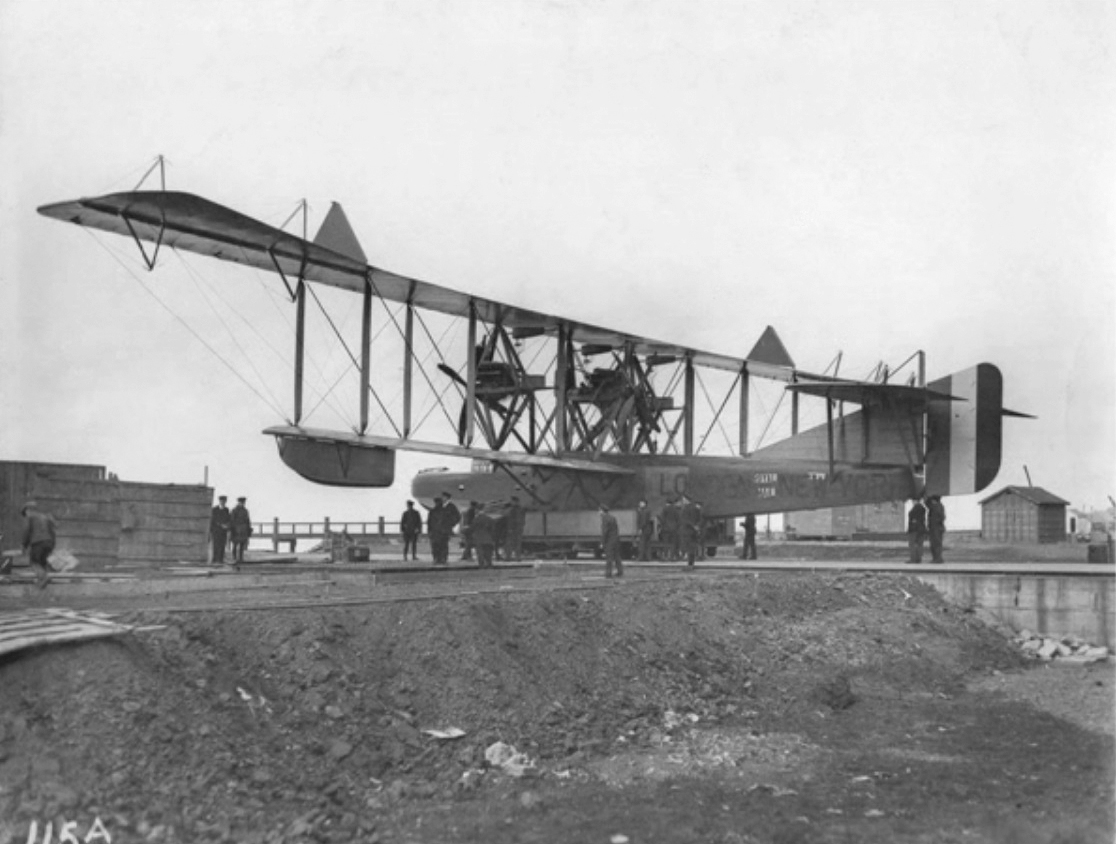
Porte Baby (No.9801) rear left; large letters LONDON NEW YORK are identifiable on the side of hull.

Data from The Felixstowe Flying-Boats: Historic Military Aircraft No. 11 Part 3

General characteristics

- Crew: 5
- Length: 63 ft 0 in (19.21 m)
- Wingspan: 124 ft 0 in (37.8 m)
- Height: 25 ft 0 in (7.62 m)
- Wing area: 2,364 sq ft (219.7 m^{2})
- Empty weight: 14,700 lb (6,682 kg)
- Gross weight: 18,600 lb (8,455 kg)
- Powerplant: 3 × Rolls-Royce Eagle VII V12 inline piston, 345 hp (257 kW) each

Performance

- Maximum speed: 87.5 mph (141 km/h, 76 kn) at 2,000 ft (610 m)
- Service ceiling: 8,000 ft (2,440 m)
- Time to altitude: 25 min 5 s to 6,500 ft (1,980 m)

Armament

- Guns: 3 × Lewis guns (1 in nose, 2 amidships)

== See also ==
- Parasite aircraft
- Short Mayo Composite

Related development

- Curtiss Model H
- Curtiss Model T
- Felixstowe Fury (Porte Super-Baby)
