= Wight Converted Seaplane =

Type of aircraft

Converted Seaplane
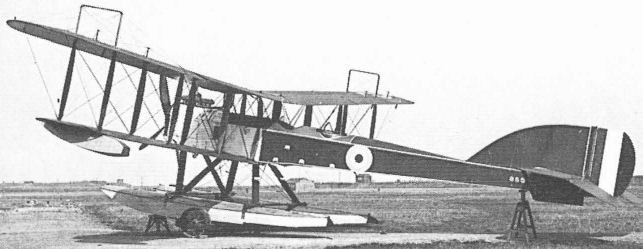
- Wight Converted Seaplane (No. 9583)

General information
- Type: Biplane floatplane
- Manufacturer: John Samuel White & Company Limited (Wight Aircraft)
- Primary user: Royal Naval Air Service
- Number built: 37

History
- First flight: 1916

The Wight Converted Seaplane was a British twin-float patrol seaplane produced by John Samuel White & Company Limited (Wight Aircraft).

== Design and development ==
Developed from the unsuccessful Wight Bomber for use as an anti-submarine patrol aircraft, the "Converted" Seaplane was a straightforward adaptation of the landplane bomber to a seaplane. The aircraft was a three-bay biplane with unswept, unequal span, unstaggered wings. It had twin floats under the fuselage and additional floats at tail and wings tips. Initial production aircraft were powered by a 322 hp Rolls-Royce Eagle IV engine mounted in the nose driving a four-bladed propeller, with later production batches being powered by a 265 hp (198 kW) Sunbeam Maori engine owing to shortages of Eagles. Fifty were ordered for the RNAS, of which only 37 were completed.

== Operational history ==
The Converted Seaplane entered service with the RNAS in 1917, operating from bases at Calshot, Dover, Portland and Cherbourg. On 18 August 1917, a Wight Converted Seaplane flying from Cherbourg sank the German U-boat UB-32 with a single 100 lb bomb, the first submarine to be sunk in the English Channel by direct air action. Seven remained in service with the RAF at the end of the First World War.

== Operators ==
United Kingdom

- Royal Naval Air Service
- Royal Air Force

== Specifications (Seaplane – Eagle engine) ==
Data from The British Bomber since 1914

General characteristics

- Crew: 2
- Length: 44 ft 8.5 in (13.627 m)
- Wingspan: 65 ft 6 in (19.96 m)
- Height: 16 ft 0 in (4.88 m)
- Wing area: 715 sq ft (66.4 m^{2})
- Empty weight: 3,758 lb (1,705 kg)
- Gross weight: 5,556 lb (2,520 kg)
- Powerplant: 1 × Rolls-Royce Eagle IV V-12 water-cooled piston engine, 322 hp (240 kW)
- Propellers: 4-bladed fixed-pitch propeller

Performance

- Maximum speed: 84 mph (135 km/h, 73 kn)
- Endurance: 3½ hours
- Service ceiling: 9,600 ft (2,900 m)
- Time to altitude: 6,500 ft (1,981 m) 18 min 20 sec

== See also ==
Aircraft of comparable role, configuration, and era

- Short 184

Related lists

- List of aircraft of the Fleet Air Arm
