= Gosport Aircraft Company =

Aircraft manufacturer in England

- Company type: Privately held company
- Industry: Aerospace
- Founded: c.1914
- Defunct: 1920
- Fate: Out of business c. 1919
- Headquarters: Gosport, Hampshire, United Kingdom
- Number of locations: 3
- Key people: Sir Charles Allom; Charles Ernest Nicholson; Magnus Herman Volk AFRAeS; John Cyril Porte; Lt.-Col. Ralph Hope-Vere. AFC; Francis Percy Beadle
- Products: Flying boats

The Gosport Aircraft Company was a short-lived British aircraft manufacturer based at Gosport, Hampshire formed at the start of the First World War by Sir Charles Allom of White, Allom & Company and Charles Ernest Nicholson of Camper and Nicholsons boat-builders. The company built a number of flying-boats for the British government including the hull for the Fairey Atalanta which at the time was the largest flying-boat hull built in the world.

== Aircraft ==
The hulls were built at the Camper and Nicholsons Gosport Yard and towed round to Northam to complete the assembly

- FBA Type B pusher biplane patrol flying boat, flying surfaces for sixty built for the RNAS.
- Felixstowe F.5 tractor biplane patrol flying boat, cancelled by the RAF in January 1919 after ten from an order of fifty delivered.

== Projects ==
Following the end of the First World War, the company proposed a number of designs published 31 July 1919 in Flight magazine:

- Gosport Fire Fighter - a 10-seater flying boat designed to carry men and material to the scene of a forest fire or emergency based on the Felixstowe F.5.
- Gosport Mail - a six passenger luxury flying boat for long distance passenger, mail and goods-carrying based on the Norman Thompson N.T.4A.
- Gosport Patrol Boat - a two-seater flying boat for use as a fast patrol or police boat.
- Gosport Two-seater Touring Boat - a flying boat with a tail boom for the American market.
- Gosport Popular - a touring flying boat.
- Gosport Shrimp - a single-seat flying boat.

In December 1919 a number of larger flying-boats were proposed, designed by John Porte who joined the company in August 1919:

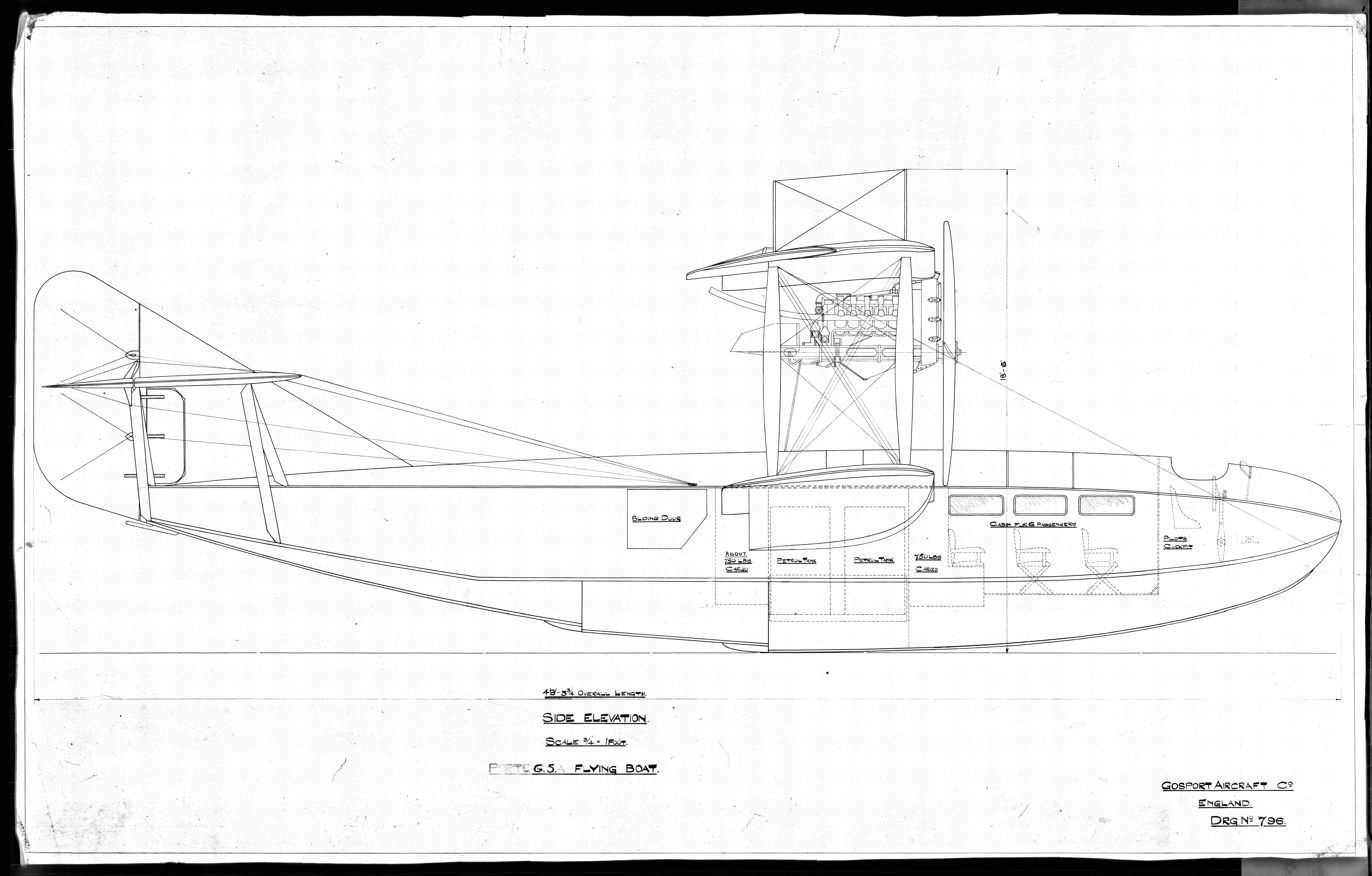
General arrangement drawing of a Gosport G.5 side view.

- Gosport G5 - a twin-engined biplane flying boat with a 103 ft span and a length of 49 ft 3in, for two crew and six passengers or cargo based on the Felixstowe F.5.
- Gosport G5a - a smaller variant of the G5 with a 97 ft 6in span and only 46 ft in length.
- Gosport G8 - a biplane flying boat for one pilot and three-passengers.
- Gosport G8a - a biplane flying boat similar to the G8.
- Gosport G9 - a triplane three-engined flying boat for long distance cargo work or ten passengers and three crew, with a 113 foot wingspan. A commercial version of Porte's Felixstowe Fury

With the death of Porte in October 1919 none of the flying boats proposed were built, and by the middle of 1920 the company had closed.
