= Curtiss Model H =

American 1914 long range flying boat

Model H family
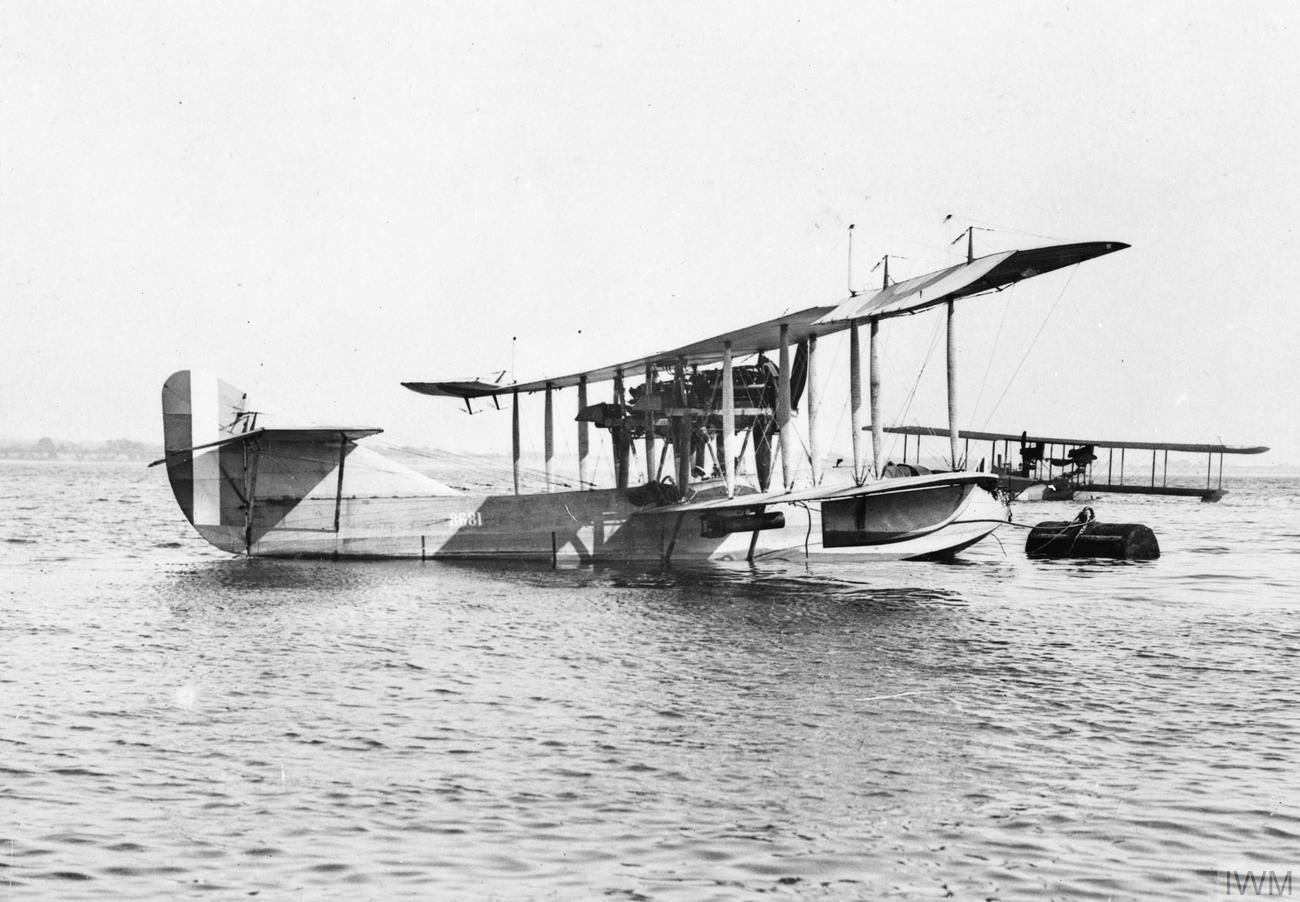
- Curtiss H-12 Large America in RNAS service.

General information
- Type: Experimental flying boat
- Manufacturer: Curtiss Aeroplane and Motor Company
- Primary users: United States Navy Royal Naval Air Service
- Number built: 478

History
- First flight: 23 June 1914 (America)
- Developed from: Curtiss Model F
- Variants: Felixstowe F.1; Felixstowe F.2

The Curtiss Model H was a family of classes of early long-range flying boats, the first two of which were developed directly on commission in the United States in response to the £10,000 prize challenge issued in 1913 by the London newspaper, the Daily Mail, for the first non-stop aerial crossing of the Atlantic. As the first aircraft having transatlantic range and cargo-carrying capacity, it became the grandfather development leading to early international commercial air travel, and by extension, to the modern world of commercial aviation. The last widely produced class, the Model H-12, was retrospectively designated Model 6 by Curtiss' company in the 1930s, and various classes have variants with suffixed letters indicating differences.

== Design and development ==
Having transatlantic range and cargo carrying capacity by design, the first H-2 class (soon dubbed "The Americans" by the Royal Navy) was quickly drafted into wartime use as a patrol and rescue aircraft by the RNAS, the air arm of the British Royal Navy. The original two "contest" aircraft were in fact temporarily seized by the Royal Navy, which later paid for them and placed an initial follow-on order for an additional 12 – all 14 of which were militarized (e.g. by adding gun mounts) and designated the "H-4" (the two originals were thereafter the "H-2" Models to air historians). These changes were produced under contract from Curtiss' factory in the last order of 50 "H-4s", giving a class total of 64, before the evolution of a succession of larger, more adaptable, and more robust H-class models. This article covers the whole line of nearly 500 Curtiss Model H seaplane flying boat aircraft known to have been produced, since successive models – by whatever sub-model designation – were physically similar, handled similarly, essentially just being increased in size and fitted with larger and improved engines – the advances in internal combustion engine technology in the 1910s being as rapid and explosive as any technological advance has ever been.

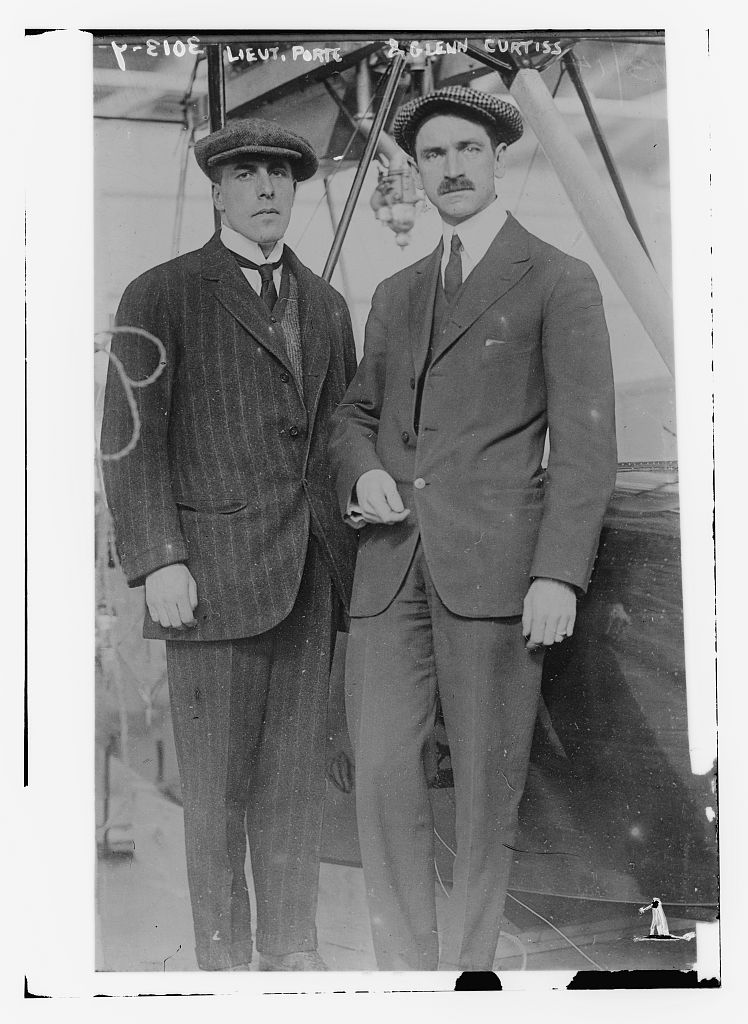
Porte and Curtiss as they appeared in The New York Times 10 March 1914, standing next to a Model F.

When London's Daily Mail newspaper put up a £10,000 prize for the first non-stop aerial crossing of the Atlantic in 1913, American businessman Rodman Wanamaker became determined that the prize should go to an American aircraft and commissioned the Curtiss Aeroplane and Motor Company to design and build an aircraft capable of making the flight. The Mail's offer of a large monetary prize for "an aircraft with transoceanic range" (in an era with virtually no airports) galvanized air enthusiasts worldwide, and in America, prompted a collaboration between the American and British air pioneers: Glenn Curtiss and John Cyril Porte, spurred financially by the nationalistically motivated financing of air enthusiast Rodman Wanamaker. The class, while commissioned by Wanamaker, was designed under Porte's supervision following his study and rearrangement of the flight plan and built in the Curtiss workshops. The outcome was a scaled-up version of Curtiss' work for the United States Navy and his Curtiss Model F. With Porte also as Chief Test Pilot, development and testing of two prototypes proceeded rapidly, despite the inevitable surprises and teething troubles inherent in new engines, hull and fuselage.

The Wanamaker Flier was a conventional biplane design with two-bay, unstaggered wings of unequal span with two tractor engines mounted side by side above the fuselage in the interplane gap. Wingtip pontoons were attached directly below the lower wings near their tips. The aircraft resembled Curtiss' earlier flying boat designs, but was considerably larger in order to carry enough fuel to cover 1,100 mi (1,770 km). The three crew members were accommodated in a fully enclosed cabin.

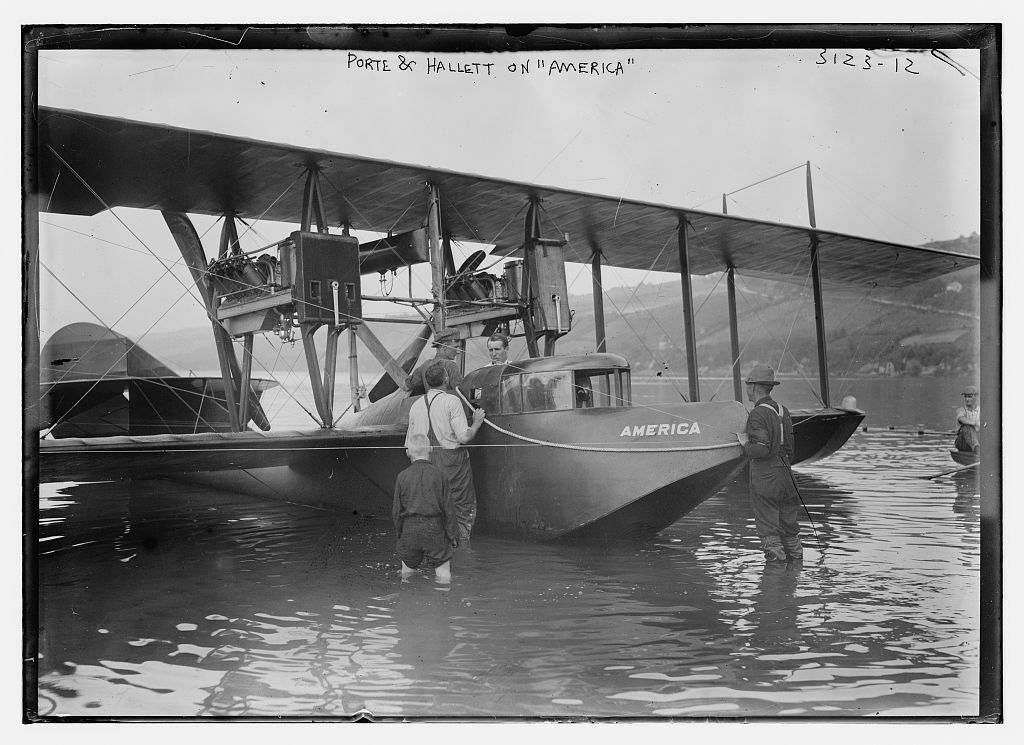
Porte & Hallett on "America", following the launch on Keuka Lake at Hammondsport, June 1914, showing the Curtiss OX-5 engines.

Named America and launched 22 June 1914, trials began the following day and soon revealed a serious shortcoming in the design: the tendency for the nose of the aircraft to try to submerge as engine power increased while taxiing on water. This phenomenon had not been encountered before, since Curtiss' earlier designs had not used such powerful engines. In order to counteract this effect, Curtiss fitted fins to the sides of the bow to add hydrodynamic lift, but soon replaced these with sponsons to add more buoyancy. Both prototypes, once fitted with sponsons, were then called Model H-2s incrementally updated alternating in succession. These sponsons would remain a prominent feature of flying boat hull design in the decades to follow. With the problem resolved, preparations for the transatlantic crossing resumed, and 5 August 1914 was selected to take advantage of the full moon.

These plans were interrupted by the outbreak of the First World War, which also saw Porte, who was to pilot the America with George Hallett, recalled to service with the British Royal Navy. Impressed by the capabilities he had witnessed, Porte urged the Admiralty to commandeer (and later, purchase) the America and her sister aircraft from Curtiss. By the late summer of 1914 they were both successfully fully tested and shipped to England 30 September, aboard RMS Mauretania. This was followed by a decision to order a further 12 similar aircraft, one Model H-2 and the remaining as Model H-4s, four examples of the latter actually being assembled in the UK by Saunders. All of these were essentially identical to the design of the America, and indeed, were all referred to as "Americas" in Royal Navy service. This initial batch was followed by an order for another 50.

These aircraft were soon of great interest to the British Admiralty as anti-submarine patrol craft and for air-sea rescue roles. The initial Royal Navy purchase of just two aircraft eventually spawned a fleet of aircraft which saw extensive military service during World War I in these roles, being extensively developed in the process (together with many spinoff or offspring variants) under the compressed research and development cycles available in wartime. Consequently, as the war progressed, the Model H was developed into progressively larger variants, and it served as the basis for parallel developments in the United Kingdom under John Cyril Porte which led to the "Felixstowe" series of flying boats with their better hydrodynamic hull forms, beginning with the Felixstowe F.1 — a hull form which thereafter became the standard in seaplanes of all kinds, just as sponsons did for flying boats.

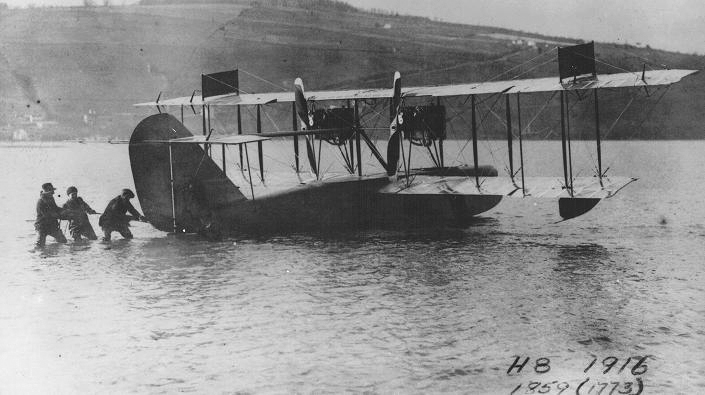
Model H-8 prototype on Lake Keuka, 1916.

Curtiss next developed an enlarged version of the same design, designated the Model H-8, with accommodation for four crew members. A prototype was constructed and offered to the United States Navy, but was ultimately also purchased by the British Admiralty. This aircraft would serve as the pattern for the Model H-12, used extensively by both the Royal Navy and the United States Navy. Upon their adoption into service by the RNAS, they became known as Large Americas, with the H-4s receiving the retronym Small America.

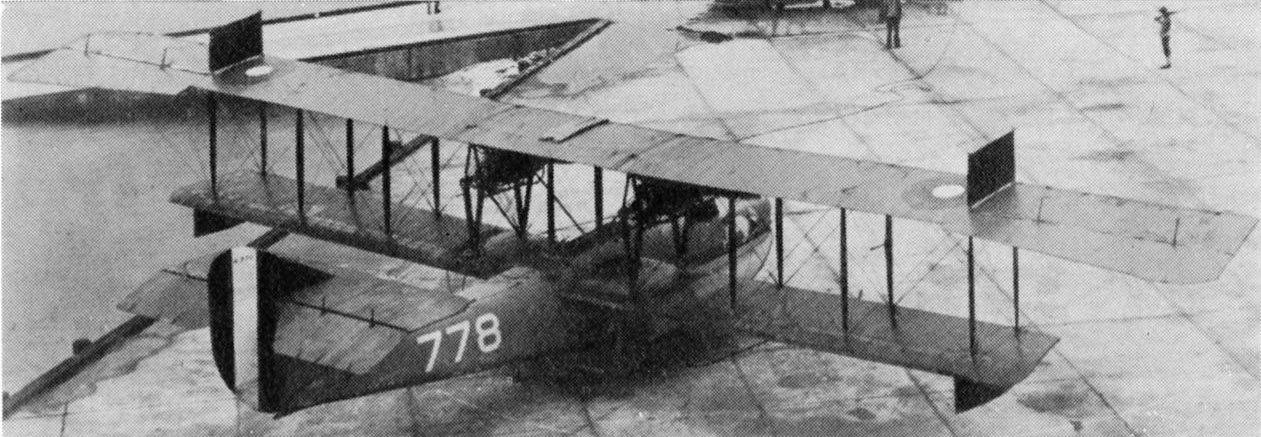
Curtiss H-12L in U.S. Navy service.

As built, the Model H-12s had 160 hp (118 kW) Curtiss V-X-X engines, but these engines were under powered and deemed unsatisfactory by the British so in Royal Naval Air Service (RNAS) service the H-12 was re-engined with the 275 hp (205 kW) Rolls-Royce Eagle I and then the 375 hp (280 kW) Eagle VIII. Porte redesigned the H-12 with an improved hull; this design, the Felixstowe F.2, was produced and entered service. Some of the H-12s were later rebuilt with a hull similar to the F.2, these rebuilds being known as the Converted Large America. Later aircraft for the U.S. Navy received the Liberty engine (designated Curtiss H-12L).

Curiously, the Curtiss company designation Model H-14 was applied to a completely unrelated design (see Curtiss HS), but the Model H-16, introduced in 1917, represented the final step in the evolution of the Model H design. With longer-span wings, and a reinforced hull similar to the Felixstowe flying boats, the H-16s were powered by Liberty engines in U.S. Navy service and by Eagle IVs for the Royal Navy. These aircraft remained in service through the end of World War I. Some were offered for sale as surplus military equipment at $11,053 apiece (one third of the original purchase price.) Others remained in U.S. Navy service for some years after the war, most receiving engine upgrades to more powerful Liberty variants.

== Operational history ==
With the RNAS, H-12s and H-16s operated from flying boat stations on the coast in long-range anti-submarine and anti-Zeppelin patrols over the North Sea. A total of 71 H-12s and 75 H-16s were received by the RNAS, commencing patrols in April 1917, with 18 H-12s and 30 H-16s remaining in service in October 1918.

U.S. Navy H-12s were kept at home and did not see foreign service, but ran anti-submarine patrols from their own naval stations. Twenty aircraft were delivered to the U.S. Navy. Some of the H-16s, however, arrived at bases in the UK in time to see limited service just before the cessation of hostilities. Navy pilots disliked H-16 because, in the event of a crash landing, the large engines above and behind the cockpit were likely to break loose and continue forward striking the pilot.

== Variants ==
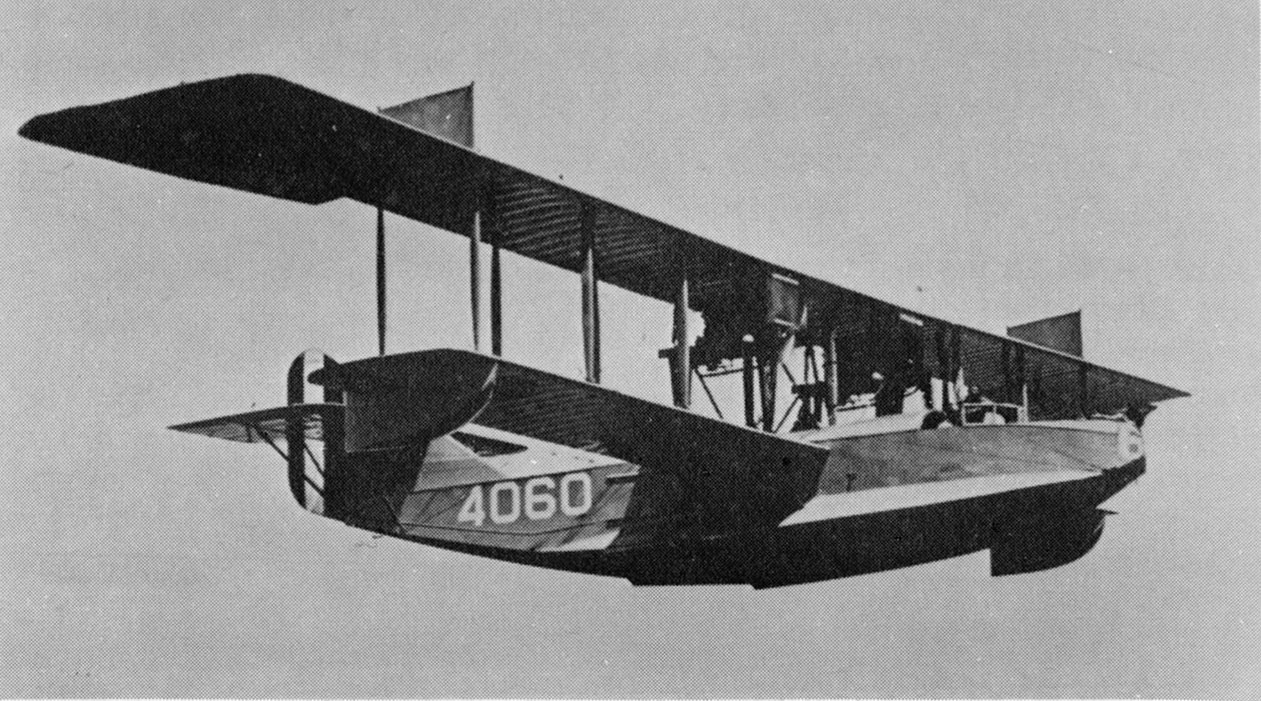
Curtiss H-16 in U.S. Navy service.

- Model H-1 or Model 6: original America intended for transatlantic crossing (two prototypes built)
- Model H-2 (one built)
- Model H-4: similar to H-1 for RNAS (62 built)
- Model H-7: Super America
- Model H-8: enlarged version of the H-4 (one prototype built)
- Model H-12 or Model 6A: production version of H-8 with Curtiss V-X-X engines (104 built)
  - Model H-12A or Model 6B: RNAS version re-engined with Rolls-Royce Eagle I
  - Model H-12B or Model 6D: RNAS version re-engined with Rolls-Royce Eagle VIII
  - Model H-12L: USN version re-engined with Liberty engine
- Model H-16 or Model 6C: enlarged version of H-12 (334 built by Curtiss and Naval Aircraft Factory)
  - Model H-16-1: Model 16 fitted with pusher engines (one built)
  - Model H-16-2: Model 16 fitted with pusher engines and revised wing cellule (one built)

== Operators ==
Brazil

- Brazilian Naval Aviation

Canada

- Canadian Air Force – two former Royal Air Force H-16 Large Americas as an Imperial Gift

Netherlands

- Royal Netherlands Naval Air Service – one Curtiss H-12 in service

United Kingdom

- Royal Naval Air Service
- Royal Air Force
  - No. 228 Squadron RAF
  - No. 234 Squadron RAF
  - No. 240 Squadron RAF
  - No. 249 Squadron RAF

United States

- United States Navy
- American Trans-Oceanic Company

== Specifications (Model H-12A) ==
Data from Curtiss Aircraft 1907–1947, British naval aircraft since 1912

General characteristics

- Crew: 4
- Length: 46 ft 6 in (14.17 m)
- Wingspan: 92 ft 8.5 in (28.258 m)
- Height: 16 ft 6 in (5.03 m)
- Wing area: 1,216 sq ft (113.0 m^{2})
- Airfoil: RAF 6
- Empty weight: 7,293 lb (3,308 kg)
- Gross weight: 10,650 lb (4,831 kg)
- Powerplant: 2 × Rolls-Royce Eagle I V-12 water-cooled piston engines, 275 hp (205 kW) each (Note: later 345 hp (257 kW) Rolls-Royce Eagle VII or 375 hp (280 kW) Rolls-Royce Eagle VIII)
- Propellers: 4-bladed fixed-pitch propellers

Performance

- Maximum speed: 85 mph (137 km/h, 74 kn) at 2,000 ft (610 m)
- Endurance: 6 hours
- Service ceiling: 10,800 ft (3,300 m)
- Rate of climb: 336 ft/min (1.71 m/s)
- Time to altitude: 2,000 ft (610 m) in 3 minutes 18 seconds; 10,000 ft (3,000 m) in 29 minutes 48 seconds

Armament

- Guns: 4 × .303 in (7.7 mm) Lewis guns on flexible mounts
- Bombs: 4 × 100 lb (45 kg) or 2 × 230 lb (100 kg) bombs below the wings

== See also ==
- Sikorsky Ilya Muromets
- Charles M. Olmsted
- British Anzani
- Tony Jannus

Related development

- Curtiss Model F
- White & Thompson No. 1 Seaplane
- Porte Baby
- Curtiss Model T (Wanamaker Triplane)
- Felixstowe F.1
- Felixstowe F.2

Aircraft of comparable role, configuration, and era

- Norman Thompson N.T.4

== Bibliography ==
- Klaauw, Bart van der (March–April 1999). "Unexpected Windfalls: Accidentally or Deliberately, More than 100 Aircraft 'arrived' in Dutch Territory During the Great War". Air Enthusiast (80): 54–59. ISSN 0143-5450.
- McMillan, Paul (May–June 1999). "Round-Out". Air Enthusiast (81): 80. ISSN 0143-5450.
- Roseberry, C.R. Glenn Curtiss: Pioneer of Flight. Garden City, NY: Doubleday & Company, 1972. ISBN 0-8156-0264-2.
- Shulman, Seth. Unlocking the Sky: Glen Hammond Curtiss and the Race to Invent the Airplane. New York: HarperCollins, 2002. ISBN 0-06-019633-5.
- Ray Sturtivant and Gordon Page Royal Navy Aircraft Serials and Units 1911–1919 Air-Britain, 1992. ISBN 0 85130 191 6
- Swanborough, Gordon and Peter M. Bowers. United States Navy Aircraft since 1911, Second edition. London: Putnam, 1976. ISBN 0-370-10054-9.
- Taylor, Michael J.H. Jane's Encyclopedia of Aviation. London: Studio Editions, 1989, p. 281. ISBN 0-7106-0710-5.
- Thetford, Owen. British Naval Aircraft since 1912, Fourth edition. London: Putnam, 1978. ISBN 0-370-30021-1.
- World Aircraft Information Files: File 891, Sheet 44–45. London: Bright Star Publishing, 2002.
- Van Wyen, Adrian O. (1969). Naval Aviation in World War I. Washington, D.C.: Chief of Naval Operations.
