= Rolls-Royce Eagle =

12-cylinder vee liquid cooled aircraft engine

Eagle
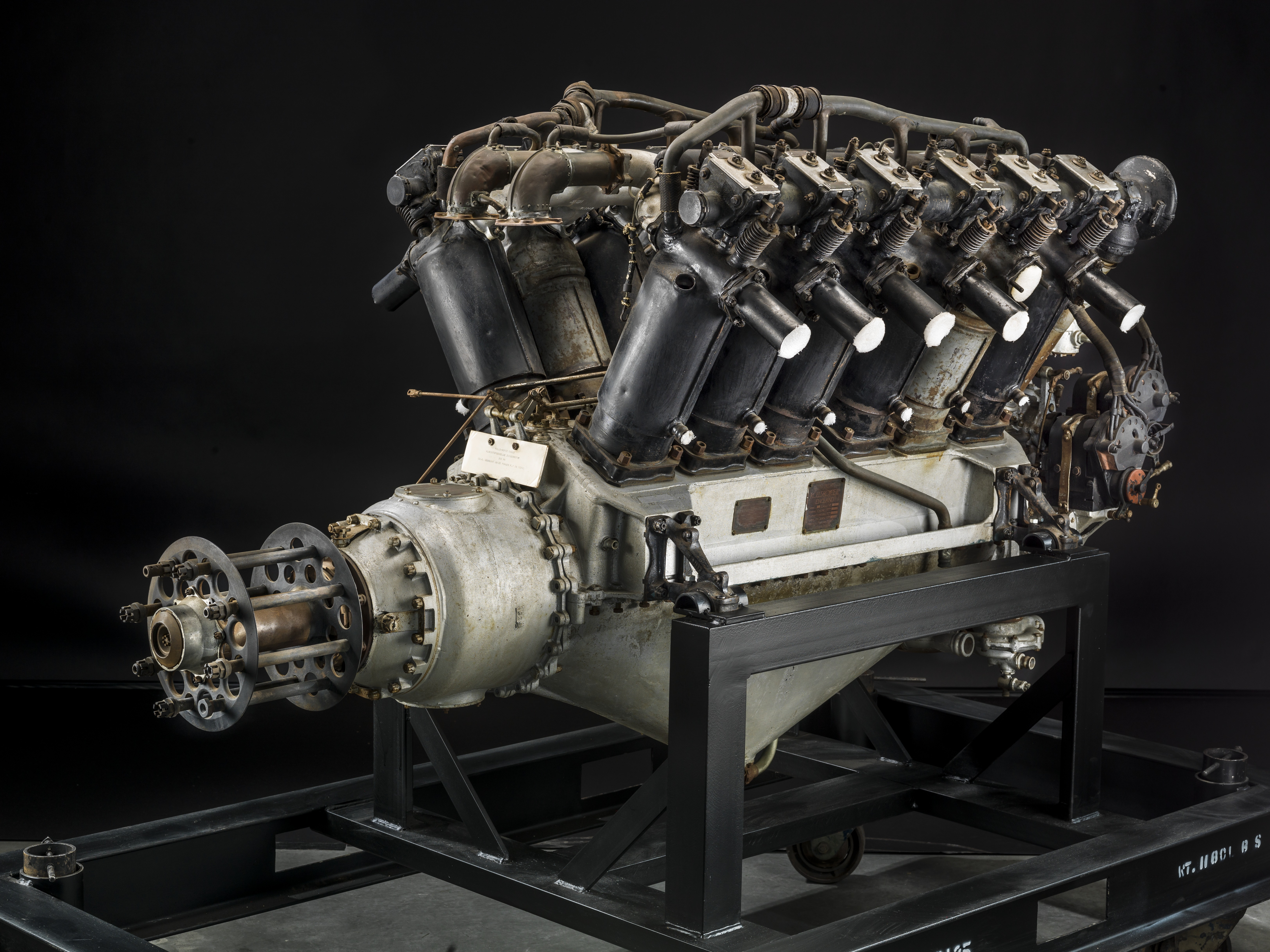
- Rolls-Royce Eagle at the National Air and Space Museum
- Type: Piston V12 aero-engine
- Manufacturer: Rolls-Royce Limited
- First run: February 1915
- Major applications: Airco D.H.4; Handley Page Type O; Vickers Vimy
- Number built: 4,681
- Developed into: Rolls-Royce Falcon

The Rolls-Royce Eagle was the first aircraft engine to be developed by Rolls-Royce Limited. Introduced in 1915 to meet British military requirements during World War I, it was used to power the Handley Page Type O bombers and a number of other military aircraft.

The Eagle was the first engine to make a non-stop trans-Atlantic crossing by aeroplane when two Eagles powered the converted Vickers Vimy bomber on the transatlantic flight of Alcock and Brown in June 1919.

== Background ==
At the outbreak of World War I in August 1914, the Royal Aircraft Factory asked Rolls-Royce to develop a new 200 hp (150 kW) air-cooled engine. Despite initial reluctance, they agreed, on condition that it be cooled by water rather than by air, which was the company's area of expertise.

== Design and development ==
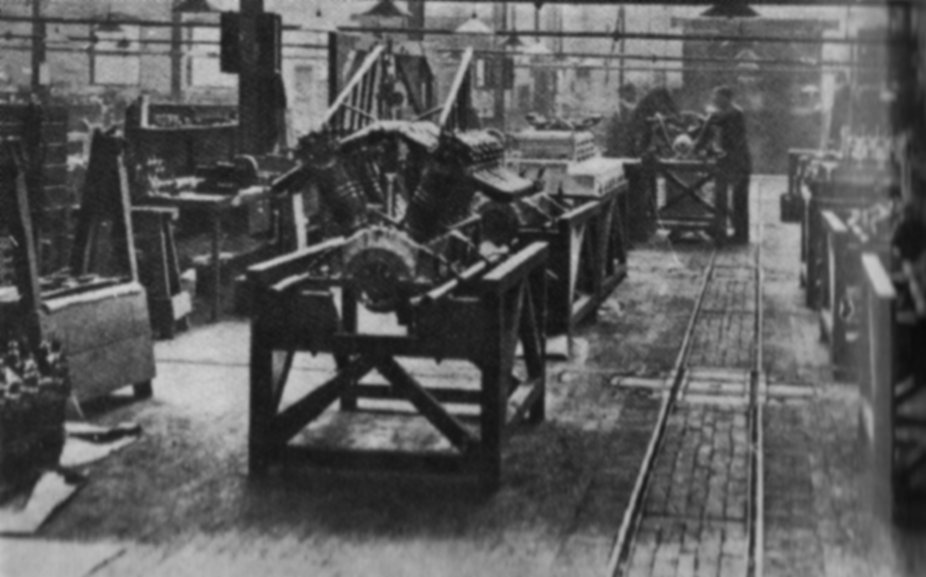
Rolls-Royce Eagle engines at Derby in 1919

Development of the new 20 litre engine was led by Henry Royce from his home in Kent. It was based initially on the 7.4 litre 40/50 Rolls-Royce Silver Ghost engine, and drew also on the design of a 7.2 litre DF80 Daimler aero engine. More inspiration was taken from the 4.5 liter SOHC engine used in one of the Mercedes 18/100 GP race cars that scored a dominating 1-2-3 win in the July 1914 French Grand Prix. Sent to display at the Mercedes dealership in London during the July Crisis, the car was acquired when the Great War broke out.

Engine power was increased by doubling the number of cylinders to twelve and increasing their stroke to 6.5 inches (170 mm), although their bore remained at 4.5 inches (110 mm) of the 40/50. The engine was also run faster, and an epicyclic reduction gear was designed to keep the propeller speed below 1,100 rpm. To reduce inertia and improve performance the valvetrain design was changed from sidevalves to a SOHC design, closely following the original "side-slot" rocker arm design philosophy used on the contemporary German Mercedes D.I, Mercedes D.II and Mercedes D.III straight-six aviation powerplants.

The engineering department of the Royal Naval Air Service (RNAS) played a key role in the success of the engine by directing the car designer W.O. Bentley, who had enlisted in the Royal Navy, to place his expertise in the design of aluminium pistons at the service of Rolls-Royce. This gave significant weight saving to the Eagle and contributed to its excellent performance.

On 3 January 1915 the Admiralty ordered twenty-five of the new engines. The Eagle first ran on a test bed at Rolls-Royce's Derby works in February 1915, producing 225 hp (168 kW) at 1,600 rpm. This was quickly increased to 1,800, then in August 1915 to 2,000 rpm where it produced 300 hp (220 kW). After further testing, it was decided to approve the engine for production at 1,800 rpm and 225 hp (168 kW); 1,900 rpm was allowed for short periods. The engine first flew on a Handley Page O/100 bomber in December 1915, the first flight of a Rolls-Royce aero engine.

The Eagle was developed further during 1916 and 1917, with power being progressively increased from 225 hp (168 kW) to 266 hp (198 kW), followed by 284 hp (212 kW), and then 322 hp (240 kW), and finally 360 hp (270 kW) by February 1918 by which time eight Eagle variants had been produced. Throughout World War I Rolls-Royce struggled to build Eagles in the quantities required by the War Office, but the company resisted pressure to license other manufacturers to produce it. The fears of Rolls-Royce that the engine's much admired quality would be compromised by other manufacturers is often given as an explanation for this resistance, but the commercial terms sought by Rolls-Royce for licence production were so restrictive that other manufacturers - apart from Brazil Straker - refused to accept them. When the Ministry of Munitions took over coordination of aircraft production in 1917, Sir William Weir declined to intervene in the company's commercial strategy, even though success of the engine owed much to the technology transfer directed by the RNAS. He preferred to support untested engines using cast aluminium components like the Siddeley Puma and the Sunbeam Arab, believing them to be better suited to mass production, in comparison to the intricate machining required to build the Eagle and its smaller cousin the Falcon.

After the War, a Mark IX version of the Eagle was developed for civilian use. Production continued until 1928, and in total 4,681 Eagle engines were built.

Time between overhaul (TBO) for later Eagles was around 100–180 hours.

== Variants ==
Note:

Eagle I (Rolls-Royce 250 hp Mk I)
(1915), 225 hp, 104 engines produced in both left and right hand tractor versions.
Eagle II (Rolls-Royce 250 hp Mk II)
(1916), 250 hp, 36 built at Derby.
Eagle III (Rolls-Royce 250 hp Mk III)
(1917-1927), 250 hp, increased compression ratio (4.9:1), strengthened pistons. 110 built at Derby.
Eagle IV (Rolls-Royce 250 hp Mk IV)
(1916-17), 270/286 hp, 36 built at Derby.

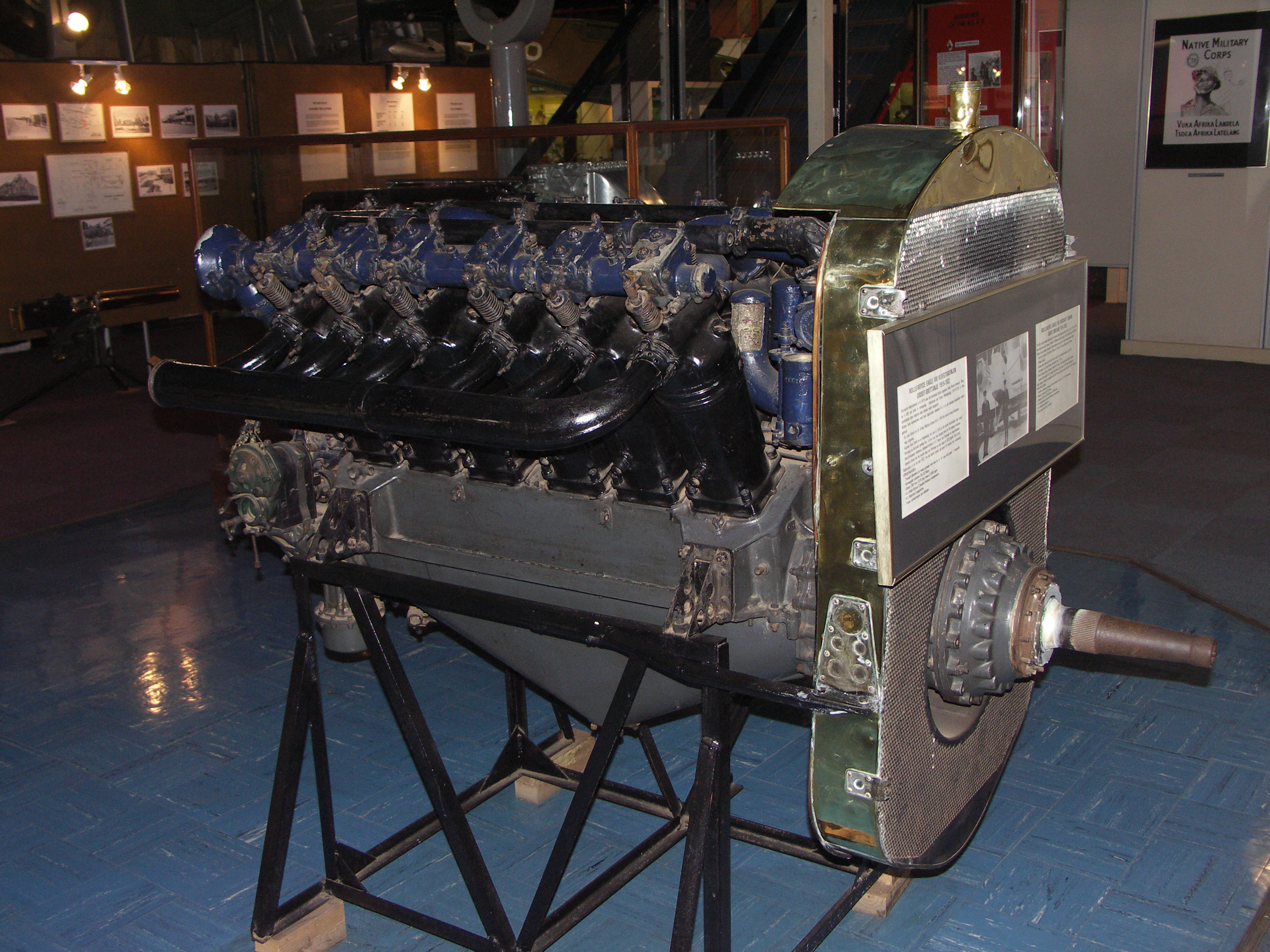
Rolls-Royce Eagle VIII

Eagle V (Rolls-Royce 275 hp Mk I)
(1916-17), 275 hp, high-lift camshaft, 100 built at Derby.
Eagle VI (Rolls-Royce 275 hp Mk II)
(1917), 275 hp, first use of twin spark plugs, 300 built at Derby.
Eagle VII (Rolls-Royce 275 hp Mk III)
(1917-18), 275 hp, 200 built at Derby.
Eagle VIII
(1917–1922), extensively modified version; NASM gives the rating of its Eagle VIII as 360 hp at 1,800 rpm, while Lumsden lists the type as 300 hp; 3,302 built at Derby.
Eagle IX
(1922-1928), 360 hp, developed as a civil use engine, 373 built at Derby.

== Applications ==
- Admiralty N.S.3 North Sea Airship
- Admiralty 23 Class Airship
- Airco DH.4
- Airco DH.9
- Airco DH.10 Amiens
- Airco DH.16
- ANEC III
- BAT F.K.26
- Blackburn Blackburd
- Curtiss H.12 Large America
- Curtiss-Wanamaker Triplane
- Dornier Do E
- Dornier Wal
- Fairey III
- Fairey Campania
- Felixstowe F.2
- Felixstowe F.3
- Felixstowe F.4
- Felixstowe F.5
- Fokker F.VII
- Grahame-White G.W.E.7
- Handasyde H.2
- Handley Page Type O
- Handley Page V/1500
- Handley Page Type W
- Hawker Horsley
- Porte Baby
- Porte Super Baby
- Martinsyde F.1
- Rohrbach Ro II
- Rohrbach Ro III
- Royal Aircraft Factory F.E.2
- Royal Aircraft Factory F.E.4
- Royal Aircraft Factory R.E.7
- Short Bomber
- Short N.1B Shirl
- Short Type 184
- Sopwith Atlantic
- Sopwith Wallaby
- Sopwith Tractor Triplane
- Supermarine Commercial Amphibian
- Supermarine Scarab
- Supermarine Sea Eagle
- Supermarine Swan
- Van Berkel W-B
- Vickers F.B.11
- Vickers Valparaiso
- Vickers Vernon
- Vickers Viking
- Vickers Vulcan
- Vickers Vulture
- Vickers Vimy
- Wight Converted Seaplane

== Engines on display ==
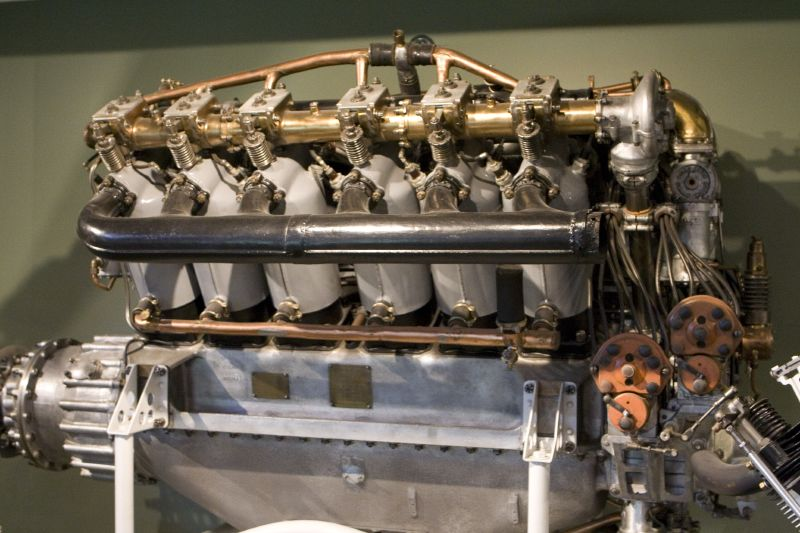
Rolls-Royce Eagle VIII at the Canada Aviation Museum

Examples of the Rolls-Royce Eagle are on display at the:

- Polish Aviation Museum, Kraków
- Science Museum, London
- Canada Aviation Museum
- South African National Museum of Military History, Johannesburg
- South African Air Force Museum, Port Elizabeth

One of the two Eagles that powered Alcock and Brown's historic transatlantic flight is on display at the Museum Of Making, Derby.

An airworthy Fokker C.IV is powered by a Rolls-Royce Eagle VIII at the Owls Head Transportation Museum, Maine.

== Specifications (Eagle IX) ==
Data from Lumsden

=== General characteristics ===
- Type: 12-cylinder liquid-cooled 60° Vee aircraft piston engine
- Bore: 4.5 in (114.3 mm)
- Stroke: 6.5 in (165.1 mm)
- Displacement: 1,239 in³ (20.32 L)
- Length: 72.6 in (1,844 mm)
- Width: 42.6 in (1,082 mm)
- Height: 46.4 in (1,178 mm)
- Dry weight: 900 lb (408 kg)

=== Components ===
- Valvetrain: Overhead camshafts
- Fuel system: Twin Claudel-Hobson carburettors
- Cooling system: Liquid-cooled

=== Performance ===
- Power output: 360 hp (268 kW) at 1,800 rpm
- Specific power: 0.32 hp/in³ (13.4 kW/L)
- Compression ratio: 5.22:1
- Fuel consumption: 24 gallons per hour (90 Litres per hour)
- Power-to-weight ratio: 0.40 hp/lb (0.66 kW/kg)

== See also ==
- Rolls-Royce aircraft piston engines

Related development

- Rolls-Royce Falcon
- Rolls-Royce Hawk
- Rolls-Royce Condor

Comparable engines

- Sunbeam Matabele

Related lists

- List of aircraft engines
