= Pegna-Bonmartini Rondine =

Rondine

General information
- Type: Single-seat ultralight sport aeroplane
- National origin: Italy
- Manufacturer: Piaggio & Co
- Designer: Giovanni Pegna
- Number built: 1

History
- First flight: 1923

The Pegna-Bonmartini Rondine, or Pegna Rondine, is a single-seat ultralight sport aeroplane designed by Giovanni Pegna and built by Piaggio in Italy during 1923.

== Development ==
Probably inspired by the success of entrants to the Lympne ultra-light aeroplane trials, Signore Pegna designed the Rondine to take advantage of small low-powered light weight engines available at the time.

== Design ==
The Rondine is a mid-winged cantilever monoplane built primarily of wood with fabric-covered wings. The fuselage is noteworthy in being clinker or carvel built similar to boat building techniques. The single piece two-spar wings are of low aspect ratio and relatively thick so external bracing is unnecessary. Control is provided by conventional ailerons and rudder, with a small fixed fin and an all-flying tailplane and elevator mounted above the rear fuselage forward of the fin. The fixed undercarriage consists of braced trousered main legs and a tail-skid.

Several powerplants were tested with poor results until the 404 cc (24.65 cu in) ABC 8 hp, used successfully in other contemporary ultra-light aircraft, fitted with a 3:1 reduction gear, was found to be satisfactory.

Accommodation for the pilot is in an open cockpit, set at mid chord, with padded edges, protected from the slipstream by a three-piece windscreen.

== Operational history ==
The Rondine was first flown by test pilot Renato Donati on 8 July 1923. The light aeroplane demonstrated high maneuverability and ease of handling, flying also as a glider. It was able to fly at 100 m altitude and 2400 rpm with only 3 hp. Maximum speed was 70–80 km/h, with landing speed 40 km/h.

The Rondine made a number of demonstration flights during the year, but when the workshop owned by Pegna (with Bonmartini and Cerroni) was bought by the Piaggio Aero Industries, it was designated the Piaggio P.1. However, the limited power of the engine installed and the small potential market for this type of light aeroplane, meant it abandonment.

== Specifications (Rondine) ==
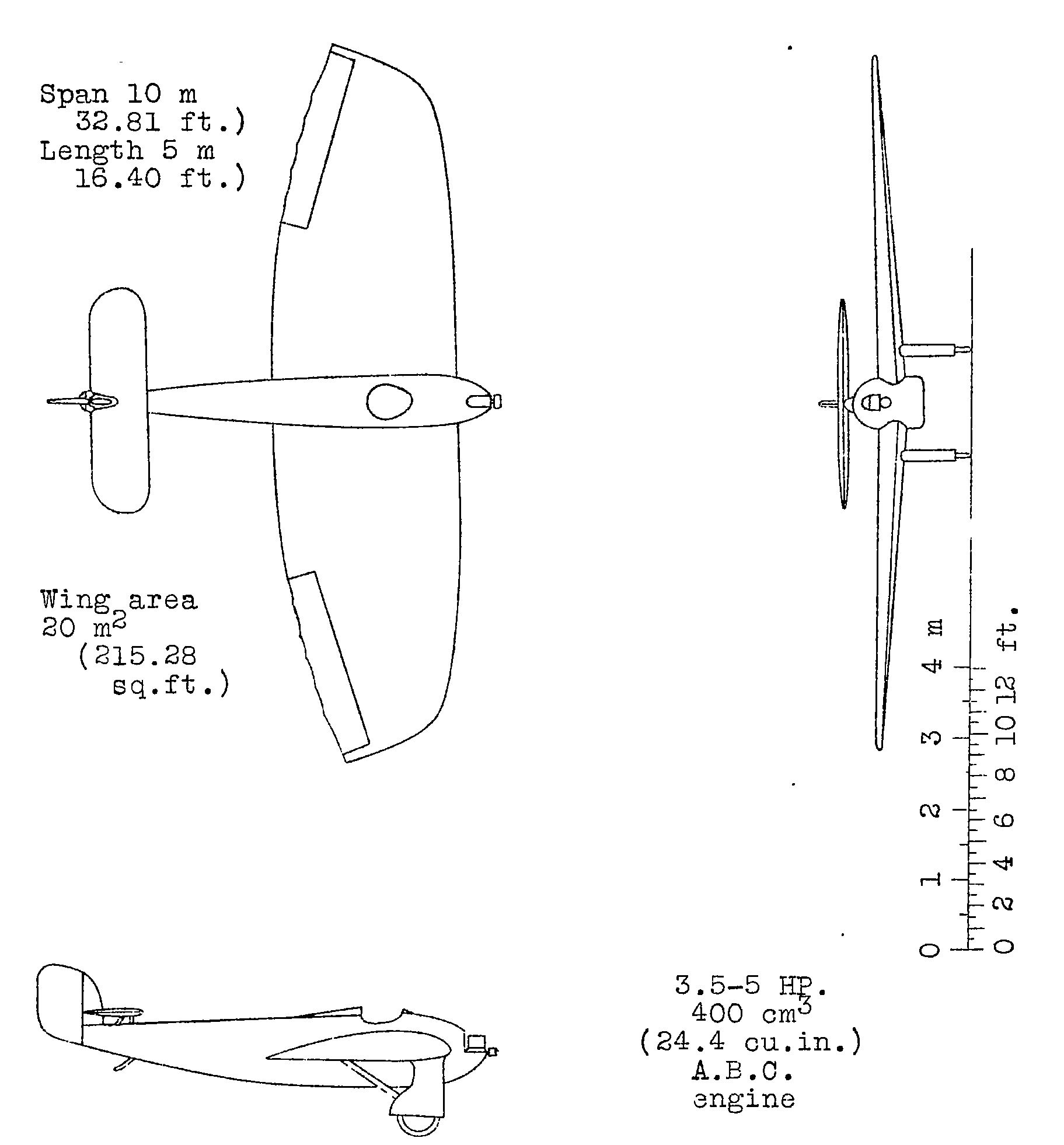
Pegna-Bonmartini Rondine 3-view drawing from NACA-TM-301

Data from Flight, 23 December 1923

General characteristics

- Crew: 1
- Length: 6 m (19 ft 8 in)
- Wingspan: 10 m (32 ft 10 in)
- Wing area: 20 m^{2} (220 sq ft)
- Aspect ratio: 5
- Empty weight: 131 kg (289 lb)
- Gross weight: 211 kg (465 lb)
- Powerplant: 1 × ABC 8hp 2-cyl. air-cooled horizontally opposed piston engine, 6.0 kW (8 hp)
- Propellers: 2-bladed fixed pitch propeller with 3:1 reduction gearing

Performance

- Maximum speed: 70 km/h (43 mph, 38 kn) *Landing speed: 40 km/h (25 mph; 22 kn)
- Lift-to-drag: 14

== See also ==
Aircraft of comparable role, configuration, and era

- Piaggio P.2
- English Electric Wren
- Handley Page H.P.22
