= William Oke Manning =

English aeronautical engineer

- Born: 20 October 1879; Staines, Middlesex, England
- Died: 2 March 1958 (aged 78); Farnham, Surrey, England
- Occupation: Aircraft designer

William Oke Manning (20 October 1879 – 2 April 1958) was an English aeronautical engineer. Although none of his aircraft were built in large numbers he is remembered for his English Electric Wren ultralight and his flying-boats.

== Early life ==
Manning was born on 20 October 1879 at Staines, Middlesex the son of Herbert Lane Manning and Alice Manning (née Richardson). He was educated at St Paul's School, London and served as an apprentice with Callender's Company.

He became an electrical engineer and in 1907 or 1908 he met Howard T. Wright who had a firm dealing with electricity generating installations and had built some early aircraft. Manning and Wright both had an interest in aviation and Manning joined his firm in December 1908.

== Howard Wright ==
The company soon established itself as the foremost aircraft constructor in the United Kingdom and Manning became the Chief Designer. The company made aircraft for private individuals and other companies, more than nine in the last few months in 1909 and another six were completed in early 1910. The most successful design was a biplane (later called the Howard Wright 1910 Biplane) which, flown by Thomas Sopwith, won a £4,000 prize for the longest flight starting in Britain and ending in mainland Europe. By 1911 business had declined and production of aircraft had ceased and after June Wright sold his aviation interests to the Coventry Ordnance Works. Manning continued to design aircraft, including the two biplanes for the War Office Aeroplane Competition in 1912.

== Royal Navy ==
On 27 November 1914 Manning left COW and was commissioned in the Royal Navy Volunteer Reserve. He was posted to the Royal Naval Air Service experimental base at Port Victoria. In September 1916 he moved to the Bradford works of the Phoenix Dynamo Manufacturing Company as technical representative for the Admiralty. The company had a number of contracts to build aircraft for the Royal Naval Air Service. Learning of Manning's background he was approached to be chief designer for the company; he was released by the Admiralty on 5 October 1916 and took up the position.

== Phoenix and English Electric ==
Manning's first design for Phoenix was the P.1 a pusher seaplane although it was not built. In November 1917 the company was awarded a contract to design an experimental flying-boat. His fifth design was to become the Phoenix P.5 Cork although it did not enter production. With the completion of the order it was decided to close the aviation department. Manning continued with his design work particularly an idea for a civil flying boat which he named the Eclectic.

With the lack of work caused by the end of the First World War a number of companies including Phoenix merged in December 1918 to form English Electric. Manning was appointed chief aircraft designer; at first interested in designing civil flying boats, he soon produced the M.3, a three-seat coastal patrol flying boat and expanded his design team.

In October 1922 Manning was invited to a gliding competition at Itford on the Sussex Downs. This inspired him to look at designs for a very small single-seat monoplane that could be powered by a motor-cycle engine. It soon was completed as the English Electric Wren and was an early example of what would be now called an ultralight. The first of three Wrens flew on 5 April 1923.

After the last Manning-designed English Electric Kingston flying boat flew, the company announced that it was to close the aviation department and Manning was made redundant in 1926. For a couple of years he became a consultant to FIAT in Italy with the design of racing seaplanes. From 1935 to 1939 he ran the airworthiness department of the British Gliding Association before moving to the Royal Aircraft Establishment at Farnborough. He later moved to Flight Refuelling Limited where he was co-inventor of a probe-mounted refuelling valve. Manning retired in 1946 and died at Farnham in Surrey on 2 March 1958.
