= English Electric Ayr =

Ayr

General information
- Type: coastal patrol flying boat
- Manufacturer: English Electric
- Designer: W.O. Manning
- Number built: 2

History
- Manufactured: 1924

The English Electric M.3 Ayr was a British three-seat coastal patrol flying boat designed and built by the English Electric Company. The aircraft refused to become airborne and the project was abandoned.

== Development ==
In 1921, English Electric's chief designer, William Oke Manning began work on designing an experimental small flying boat intended to meet a requirement for a single-engined four seat aircraft for artillery-spotting for the fleet. The design attracted the attention of the British Air Ministry, and two prototypes were ordered against Specification 12/21.

Manning's design, the Ayr, was a sesquiplane with swept (16 degrees) wings and heavy (20 degrees) dihedral on the lower wings. The watertight lower wings, mounted low on the hull where they were submerged when on the water, were intended to act as stabilising sponsons, eliminating the need for wing-tip floats. A Napier Lion engine was mounted to the upper wing. The hull was designed by Linton Hope who had designed the Kingston hulls, and accommodated the crew of four, with the pilot being provided with a cockpit amidships, positions for gunners in the aircraft's bow and in a dorsal location, while the observer was provided with an open cockpit just aft of the bow gunners position, and an enclosed position for operating the aircraft's radio inside the hull. Armament consisted of a Scarff ring carrying a single Lewis gun fitted in the bow position, with two Lewis guns fitted to the dorsal mount.

Construction of the prototypes began in 1923, but was slowed by work on English Electric's larger Kingston flying boat, with the first prototype not being completed until early 1925, being launched on 10 March 1925. Taxying at low speeds proved difficult, as the Ayr tended to rock from one wing to the other, although at speeds above 10 kn (12 mph; 19 km/h), the wings were lifted clear of the water by hydrodynamic forces, although keeping a straight course proved difficult. When take-off was attempted, water thrown off the nose submerged the lower wings, pulling the aircraft down and making take-off impossible. These problems could not be resolved, and the project was stopped, with construction of the second prototype abandoned with it half built. The first prototype's hull was taken to RAE Farnborough along with that of one of the Kingstons, and was eventually abandoned on the Basingstoke Canal, sinking in the early 1950s.

== Specifications ==
Data from British Flying Boats

General characteristics

- Crew: 3
- Length: 40 ft 8 in (12.40 m)
- Wingspan: 46 ft 0 in (14.02 m)
- Height: 13 ft 8 in (4.17 m)
- Wing area: 466 sq ft (43.3 m^{2})
- Empty weight: 4,406 lb (1,999 kg)
- Gross weight: 6,846 lb (3,105 kg)
- Powerplant: 1 × Napier Lion IIB W-12 water-cooled piston engine, 450 hp (340 kW)
- Propellers: 4-bladed fixed-pitch propeller

Performance

- Maximum speed: 127 mph (204 km/h, 110 kn)
- Service ceiling: 14,500 ft (4,400 m)

Armament

- Guns:

- 1 x 0.303 in (7.7 mm) Lewis machine gun in nose
- 1 x 0.303 in Lewis machine gun in rear cockpit

- Bombs:

- Provision for sponson carried bombs

== See also ==
Related lists

- List of flying boats and floatplanes
