= Vickers Valentia (disambiguation) =

The Vickers Company produced two aircraft with the name Valentia

- A flying boat, see Vickers Valentia
- A freighter and troop transport, see Vickers Type 264 Valentia
