= Short Cromarty =

N.3 Cromarty
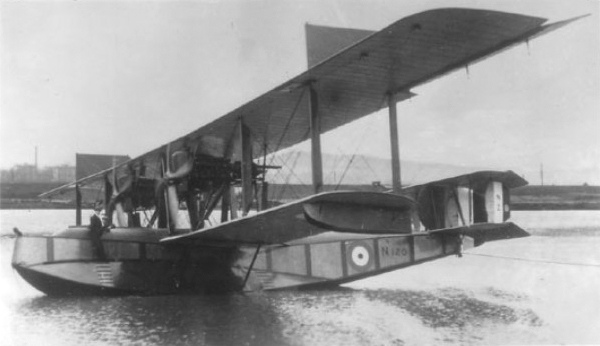
- Prototype (N120)

General information
- Type: Flying boat
- National origin: United Kingdom
- Manufacturer: Short Brothers
- Status: Prototype
- Primary user: Royal Air Force
- Number built: 1

History
- First flight: 11 April 1921

The Short N.3 Cromarty was a prototype British twin-engined biplane flying boat, designed towards the end of the First World War. Only a single example was built, which first flew in 1921 and was wrecked in 1922.

== Development ==
In April 1917, the British Admiralty developed a requirement for a long-range patrol flying boat to work in support of the Fleet, and issued Specification N.3(b) (later reissued as Air Ministry Specification XXX (Note: Following the formation of the Royal Air Force in April 1918, the specifications were re-numbered using roman numerals)) to meet this need. This resulted in designs from Vickers (for the Valentia) and Shorts of Rochester, who, although better known at the time for floatplanes, had gained experience in flying boats, building Felixstowe F.3 and F.5s under licence from April 1917.

Short Brothers received an order for three prototypes just after the Armistice ended the First World War. Short's design, the N.3 Cromarty, was a large, twin-engine biplane. It was powered by two 650 hp (480 kW) Rolls-Royce Condor engines, and had a similar, but larger hull to that of the Felixstowe flying boats, with a biplane tail. It featured a side-by-side cockpit for the two pilots, a large box cockpit for a gunner, who was armed with a COW automatic cannon, and a dorsal position for another gunner armed with a Lewis gun.

Production of the prototypes started in February 1919, but the second and third were cancelled before completion, with the first prototype eventually being launched on 21 March 1921, being first flown by John Lankester Parker on 11 April 1921.

== Operational history ==
After extensive testing, the Cromarty was handed over to the RAF's Seaplane Development Flight on 17 June 1922. In August, the Flight, comprising the Cromarty, two Felixstowe F.5s and a Phoenix Cork, set out on trials of operating large flying boats away from support facilities for extended periods of time. Arriving at St Mary's, Isles of Scilly on 21 August, the Cromarty successfully weathered a storm, but was taxied onto a reef, holing the hull. The damage was declared uneconomic to repair and the Cromarty was scrapped in place.

While the Cromarty had performed well in its limited service, one problem (as with all wooden-hulled flying boats) was soakage of water into the hull, with as much as 600 pounds (270 kg) of water absorbed after a few weeks of service. Tests with a metal-hulled Felixstowe F.5 resulted in an order for a prototype of an improved, metal-hulled flying boat, based on the Cromarty. This became the prototype Short Singapore I.

== Operators ==
United Kingdom

- Royal Air Force

== Specifications ==
Data from Short Aircraft since 1900

General characteristics

- Length: 59 ft 0 in (17.98 m)
- Wingspan: 113 ft 6 in (34.59 m)
- Height: 23 ft 0 in (7.01 m)
- Wing area: 2,243 sq ft (208.4 m^{2})
- Empty weight: 12,200 lb (5,534 kg)
- Gross weight: 18,000 lb (8,165 kg) (normal all up weight)
- Max takeoff weight: 19,800 lb (8,981 kg) (overload weight)
- Powerplant: 2 × Rolls-Royce Condor IA water-cooled V12 engine, 650 hp (480 kW) each

Performance

- Maximum speed: 95 mph (153 km/h, 83 kn)
- Range: 900 mi (1,400 km, 780 nmi)
- Endurance: 11 hr
- Time to altitude: 20 min to 6,000 ft (1,800 m)

Armament

- Guns:
  - 1× 1 1/2 lb (37 mm) COW gun in nose
  - 1× .303 in (7.7 mm) Lewis gun in dorsal position
- Bombs: 2,000 pounds (910 kg) bombs

== See also ==
Related development

- Felixstowe F.5
- Short Singapore

Aircraft of comparable role, configuration, and era

- Phoenix P.5 Cork
- Vickers Valentia

Related lists

- List of flying boats and floatplanes
