= ABC 8 hp =

1920s British piston aircraft engine

8 hp
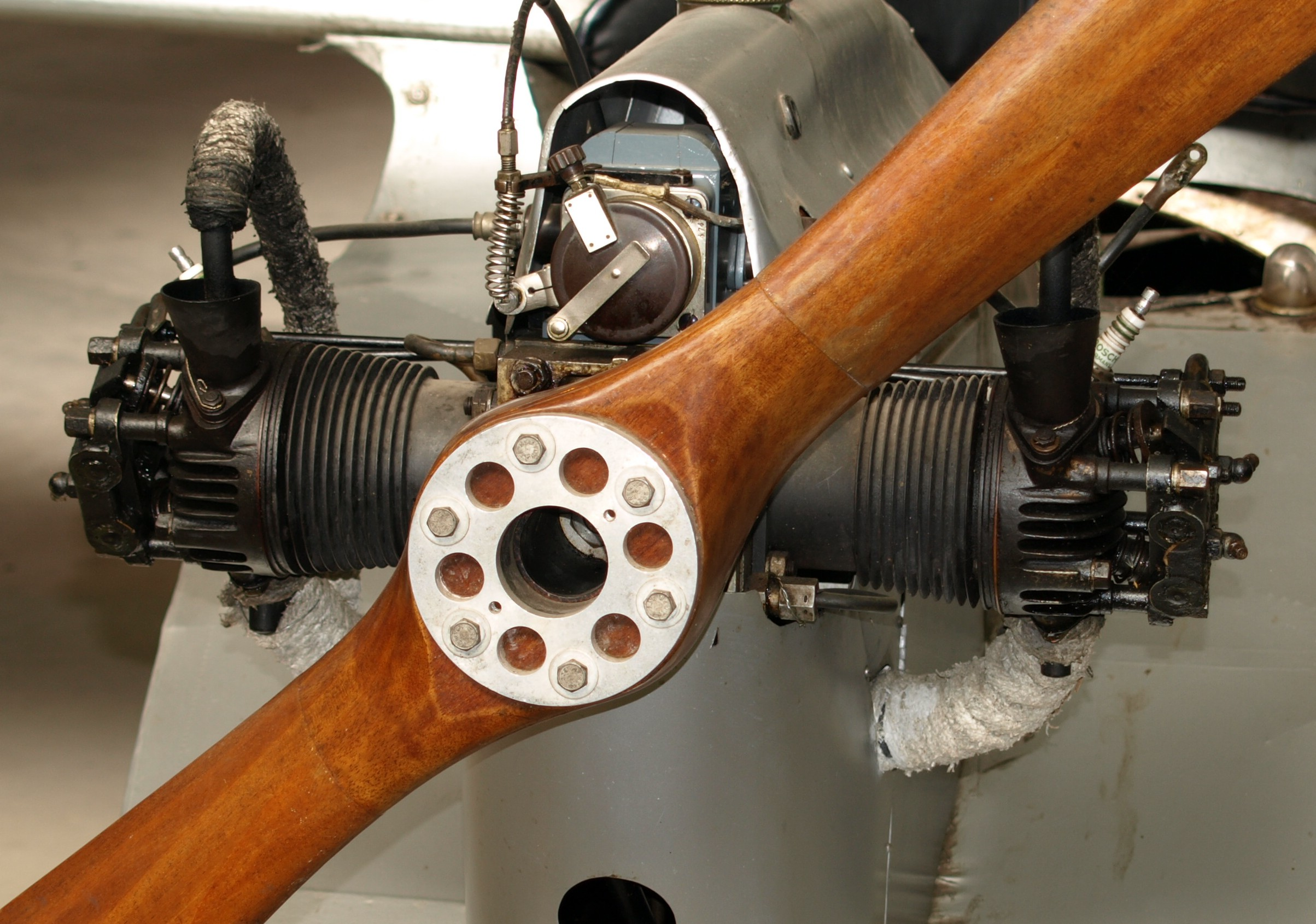
- ABC 8 hp installed in the English Electric Wren at the Shuttleworth Collection
- Type: Flat-twin aero engine
- National origin: United Kingdom
- Manufacturer: ABC Motors Limited
- Designer: Granville Bradshaw
- First run: 1923

The ABC 8 hp is an 8 hp (6 kW) twin-cylinder aero engine designed by the noted British engineer Granville Bradshaw for use in ultralight aircraft. The engine was derived from a specially tuned motorcycle unit and was built by ABC Motors, first running in 1923.

== Applications ==
- English Electric Wren
- Handley Page H.P.22
- Pegna-Bonmartini Rondine

== Surviving engines ==
The sole surviving English Electric Wren (G-EBNV) flies occasionally at the Shuttleworth Collection at Old Warden and is powered by an ABC 8 hp engine. With barely enough power to maintain flight the aircraft is assisted into the air by a team of volunteers using bungee cord, after which the Wren lands straight ahead following a short 'hop'.

== Specifications (ABC 8 hp) ==
Data from Lumsden

=== General characteristics ===
- Type: Air-cooled flat-twin
- Bore: 2.72 in (69 mm)
- Stroke: 2.13 in (54 mm)
- Displacement: 24.76 cu in (404 cc)
- Dry weight: 41 lb (18.6 kg)

=== Components ===
- Valvetrain: Overhead valve, two valves per cylinder
- Fuel system: Carburettor
- Fuel type: Petrol
- Cooling system: Air-cooled

=== Performance ===
- Power output: 8 hp (6 kW) at 4,500 rpm
- Power-to-weight ratio: 0.2 hp/lb (0.32 kW/kg)

== See also ==
- ABC motorcycles

Related development

- ABC Scorpion

Comparable engines

- Armstrong Siddeley Ounce
- Bristol Cherub
- Walter Atom

Related lists

- List of aircraft engines
