= Phoenix Dynamo Manufacturing Company =

English motor manufacturing company

Phoenix Dynamo Manufacturing Company Limited of Hubert Street, Leeds Road, Bradford, Yorkshire, electrical engineers, manufactured small and large motors, alternators and generators at their Thornbury works. They briefly manufactured major aircraft components during the later half of World War I. Their London offices were at 17 Victoria Street, Westminster SW.

The business was operating from the Hubert Street Bradford address in late 1895 making arc lamps and electrical instruments. By 1900 they were on record for the manufacture of small rotating electric machinery for the textile industry. A limited liability company was incorporated to own the business in June 1903 under the same name. The company itself was voluntarily wound up 11 June 1923 following the 1921 transfer of all its assets to post-1918 owner English Electric where its operations continued.

== History ==
A Phoenix dynamo was a type of dynamo designed by W B Esson when he was manager of manufacturer Paterson & Cooper (Edward James Paterson & Charles F Cooper) who were electrical engineers of Glasgow and Dalston. Paterson & Cooper ceased operating in 1895 and their business was resumed by Paterson Cooper & Co Limited of London and Paisley.

Phoenix Dynamo Manufacturing Company (an unincorporated firm or partnership) of Hubert Street, Leeds Road was active by 1895 manufacturing arc lamps and electrical instruments. By 1900 Phoenix Dynamo were manufacturing small motors and dynamos for driving machinery and providing lighting specifically for the textile industry but they soon found wider markets and manufactured large motors, turbines, turbo-generators etc. and were also engaged on Admiralty and War Office assignments.

In February 1903 Phoenix Dynamo purchased the whole of the works, business and patent rights of Bradford's Rosling & Fynn Limited (in liquidation) and announced that after some extensions to the buildings were complete those operations would be consolidated at Thornbury.

In June 1903 it was announced that a limited liability company had been incorporated, Phoenix Dynamo Manufacturing Company Limited, with a capital of £60,000 to acquire the business of electrical engineers and contractors carried on by the firm known as Phoenix Dynamo Manufacturing Company (Charles Brooke Crawshaw, Herbert Alexander Jones (manager)) at Thornbury Works, Bradford. (Note: C B Crawshaw 1855-1929 of Dewsbury, West Yorkshire and Crawshaw & Warburton owned a number of collieries, H A Jones ran Phoenix Dynamo for him. Durham Mining Museum)

The lack of information on this business's activities could be attributed to its pre-war Admiralty and War Office contracts. On page 102 of a 1917 report of an inquiry into Works Committees the Bulletin of the United States Bureau of Labor Statistics reported that Phoenix Dynamo was a firm employing about 4,000 employees and was now in addition to its ordinary product producing "miscellaneous munitions supplies". During the war Phoenix Dynamo contracted to the Admiralty to build Short seaplanes. It produced millions of shells, a large quantity of machine tools and the fastest and biggest sea planes and flying boats. After the Armistice in November 1918 Phoenix Dynamo merged with four other businesses to form English Electric and Phoenix Dynamo became English Electric's centre for electric motor and generator design.

== Products ==
- Small and large electric motors, alternators and generators

=== Wartime ===
Phoenix P.5 Cork, a twin-engined biplane flying boat, designed in-house by William Oke Manning and built by Phoenix late in the First World War. Manning resumed its development in 1922 as the English Electric P.5 Kingston

Aircraft manufactured under licence:
Short Type 184
Felixstowe F.3
Felixstowe F.5
Fairey N.4

== Notable employees ==
- Robert Pohl (1879–1956) joined from Germany in 1904 and was Chief Engineer from 1907 until 1919 when he returned to Germany at AEG Turbine Works in Berlin. After nearly 20 years he returned to teach at Birmingham University. One of the originators of the Interpole. Early advocate for alternating current traction.
- John Pybus (1880–1935) after his apprenticeship to a firm of engineers joined Phoenix Dynamo in 1906. He became managing director during the war. He was appointed chairman of English Electric and was a director of many companies and Minister of Transport between 1931 and 1933. He had been elected Liberal MP for Harwich in 1929.
- W.O. Manning (1879–1958) chief designer of aircraft 1916–1926.
