= Luton Analogue Computing Engine =

Analogue computer

The Luton Analogue Computing Engine (LACE) was a code name for a military general purpose analogue computer, predominantly used for missile simulation. It was developed in 1953-1956 by English Electric's Guided Missile Division in Luton, UK. Upon the closure of the Luton factory in 1962, LACE was transferred to the British Aircraft Corporation (BAC) Guided Weapons Division in Stevenage.
