= Fairey N.4 =

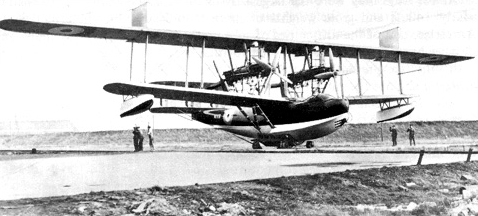
- Fairey N.4 Mk.1 Atalanta (N119) c. April 1924 at the Marine Aircraft Experimental Establishment, Isle of Grain.

General information
- Type: Long-range reconnaissance flying-boat
- National origin: United Kingdom
- Manufacturer: Fairey Aviation Company; Phoenix Dynamo Manufacturing Company; Dick, Kerr & Co. Gosport Aircraft Company (hull only); May, Harden & May (hull only); William Fife & Sons (hull only)
- Designer: Charles Richard Fairey
- Status: Prototype
- Owners: Admiralty
- Primary user: Royal Air Force
- Number built: 3

History
- First flight: 4 July 1923
- Retired: 1928

The Fairey N.4 was a 1920s British five-seat long range reconnaissance flying boat. Designed and built by the Fairey Aviation Company to meet an Admiralty requirement for a very large four-engined reconnaissance aircraft, it was the world's largest flying boat when it first flew in 1923.

== Development ==
Following an increase in experience with flying boats in 1917 the Admiralty issued Specification N.4. The specification called for a four-engined long-range reconnaissance flying boat. The Admiralty ordered two aircraft from Fairey and one from Phoenix Dynamo Manufacturing Company. Fairey sub-contracted the building of the second to Dick, Kerr & Co. of Lytham St. Annes.

Not unusual for the era, the design was a biplane, with the engines mounted as two push-pull pairs between the upper and lower wing, each driving a four-bladed propeller.

The first N.4 (N118) (named Atalanta) was assembled by Phoenix Dynamo with a hull designed by Charles Nicholson, built by the Gosport Aircraft Company. Transported by road to the Isle of Grain, the aircraft was used for flotation tests, but not fully completed, remaining unflown and scrapped as the service lost interest in large flying boats. During April 1919 when the hull was complete, Flight reported the aircraft would be even larger than the Felixstowe Fury.

The second N.4 (also named Atalanta) first flew on 4 July 1923, powered by four 650 hp (485 kW) Rolls-Royce Condor IA piston engines. The hull built in Hythe by May, Harden & May and delivered to Lytham St. Annes for assembly. Completed in 1921, the aircraft was then dismantled, taken by road to the Isle of Grain and stored before for its first flight.

The third N.4 Mk.II (named Titania) included improvements and later variant Condor III engines. The hull designed by Linton Hope, built on the Clyde by yacht builders Fifes and delivered to The Fairey Aviation Company at Hamble, Southampton for assembly and transport to the Isle of Grain. Titania was not flown initially and stored, first flying on 24 July 1925; trials continued until 1928.

== Fate ==
Decommissioned, the hull of Atalanta (N119) was moved to Felixstowe Ferry about February 1928, where the hull of Vickers Valentia (N126) was also recorded as a house boat. Atalanta survived as a conversion until about 1964 when, in dangerious condition it was broken up and burnt on site.

== Operators ==
United Kingdom

- Royal Air Force
  - Marine and Armament Experimental Establishment
  - Marine Aircraft Experimental Establishment

== Specifications (Mk II Titania) ==
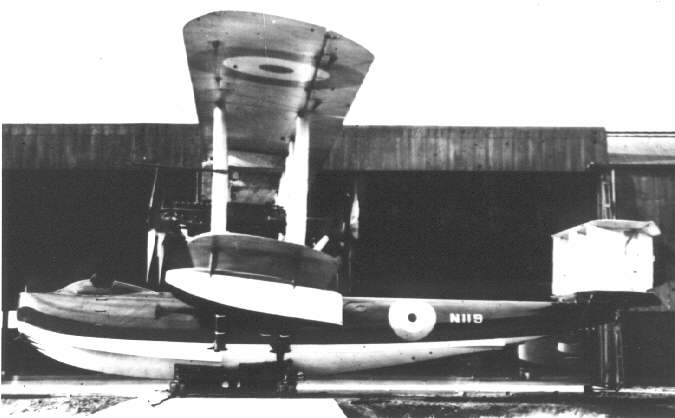
Fairey N.4 Mk.I Atalanta (N119), hull built by May, Harden and May

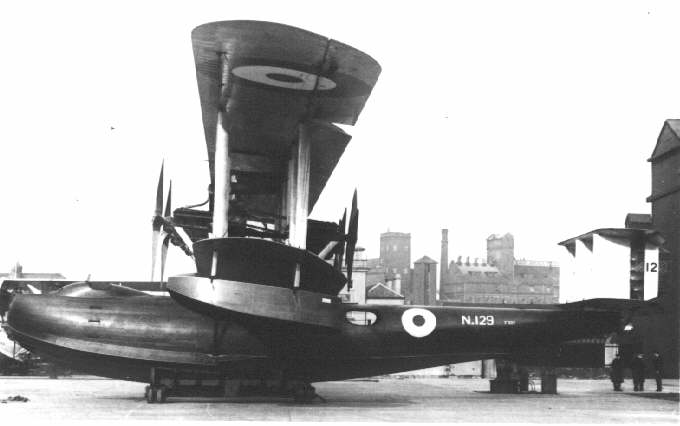
Fairey N.4 Mk.II Titania (N.129), hull designed by Linton Hope, built by Fifes - photographed at Felixstowe.

Data from

General characteristics

- Crew: 5
- Length: 60 ft 0 in (20.12 m)
- Wingspan: 139 ft 0 in (42.37 m)
- Wing area: 2,900 sq ft (269.41 m^{2})
- Gross weight: 31,612 lb (14,339 kg)
- Powerplant: 4 × Rolls-Royce Condor III Vee piston engine , 650 hp (485 kW) each

Performance

- Maximum speed: 115 mph (185 km/h, 100 kn)
- Endurance: 9 hours 0 minutes
- Service ceiling: 14,100 ft (4,300 m)

Armament

- 0.303in (7.7mm) Lewis machine-gun (in nose and beam positions)
- 1000lb (454kg) of bombs

== See also ==
- Fairey Marine
- Gosport G9

Aircraft of comparable role, configuration, and era

- Curtiss NC
- Phoenix P.5 Cork
- Supermarine Southampton

Related lists

- List of flying boats and floatplanes
