= COW Biplane =

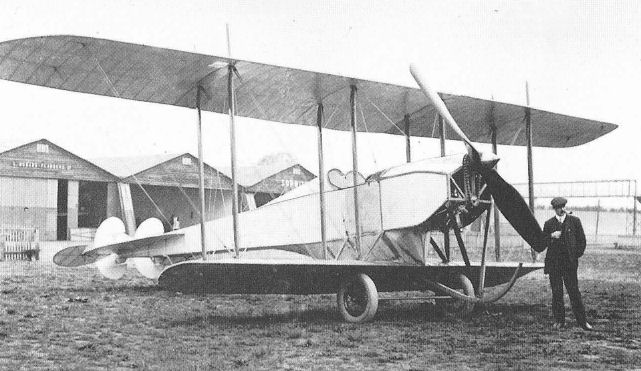
- Biplane No. 10

General information
- Type: Military Biplane
- National origin: United Kingdom
- Manufacturer: Coventry Ordnance Works
- Designer: W.O. Manning
- Number built: 2

History
- First flight: 1912

The COW Biplanes were a pair of similar British tractor biplanes built to compete in the 1912 British Military Aeroplane Competition. They were not successful.

== Design and development ==
When the War Office held a competition to find a military aeroplane for the newly formed Royal Flying Corps, the directors of the Coventry Ordnance Works decided to enter two aircraft. The company had just taken over the business of Howard T. Wright in Battersea, and they directed Wright and W.O. Manning to design and build the aircraft.

Manning designed two slightly different aircraft. Both were unequal-span tractor biplanes; the first had the two crew members seated side-by-side, and was powered by a 100 hp (75 kW) Gnome rotary engine, the other had the two crew in tandem and was powered by a 110 hp (82 kW) Chenu inline engine.

Construction of the Gnome powered aircraft started at Battersea in early 1912, by the end of April 1912 the components of the aircraft were moved to Hangar No. 32 at Brooklands for completion. The aircraft flew soon afterwards piloted by Thomas Sopwith who had been hired as a test pilot. On the day after the first flight the aircraft entered an impromptu competition and race at Brooklands, taking three passengers with two of the passengers sitting outside of the cockpit on the lower wing.

Construction of the second Chenu-powered aircraft followed and it was delivered to Brooklands in July 1912. The second aircraft differed in engine, seating arrangement, smaller wingspan, and shorter fuselage. Unusually for its time, it was fitted with a four-bladed propeller which was made from two two-bladed propellers joined together.

The War Office allocated Trial No. 10 to the Gnome-powered aircraft and No. 11 to the Chenu-powered one: thereafter they were always identified as Biplane No. 10 and Biplane No. 11. No. 10 arrived at Larkhill Aerodrome in good time for the competition but No. 11 was moved by road and due to delays it missed the entry deadline. Although No. 11 was not disqualified it failed to compete due to engine problems, suffering repeated failures of the magneto drive followed by failure of the reduction gear housing (similar problems with a Chenu engine also grounded the Martin and Handasyde entry to the competition). No. 10 started the competition but had to be withdrawn with propeller problems.

The aircraft could not be fixed at Larkhill as Manning was abroad and Wright had left the company, so the aircraft were returned to Brooklands after the competition for further work. Manning decided to re-build No. 10 using the original fuselage and tail and retaining the engine, but it was fitted with new wings and landing gear. The modified No. 10 flew again on 13 January 1913 and was flown throughout 1913. The fate on No. 11 is unknown.

== Variants ==
No. 10
Gnome-powered biplane for 1912 Military Aeroplane Competition with side-by-side seating, later modified with new wings and other changes.
No. 11
Chenu-powered biplane for 1912 Military Aeroplane Competition with tandem seating.

== Specifications (No. 10) ==
Data from English Electric Aircraft and their predecessors, Flight

General characteristics

- Crew: 2
- Length: 33 ft 3 in (10.13 m)
- Upper wingspan: 40 ft (12 m)
- Lower wingspan: 24 ft (7.3 m)
- Wing area: 336.7 sq ft (31.28 m^{2})
- Empty weight: 1,200 lb (544 kg)
- Gross weight: 1,950 lb (885 kg)
- Fuel capacity: 40 imp gal (48 US gal; 182 L) plus 10 imp gal (12 US gal; 45 L) gravity feed auxiliary
- Powerplant: 1 × Gnome 14 Omega-Omega 14-cylinder two-row air-cooled rotary piston engine, 100 hp (75 kW) with 2:1 chain reduction gearing
- Propellers: 2-bladed fixed-pitch propeller, 11 ft 6 in (3.51 m) diameter

Performance

- Maximum speed: 60 mph (97 km/h, 52 kn)
