= English Electric Wren =

1921 British light aircraft

Wren
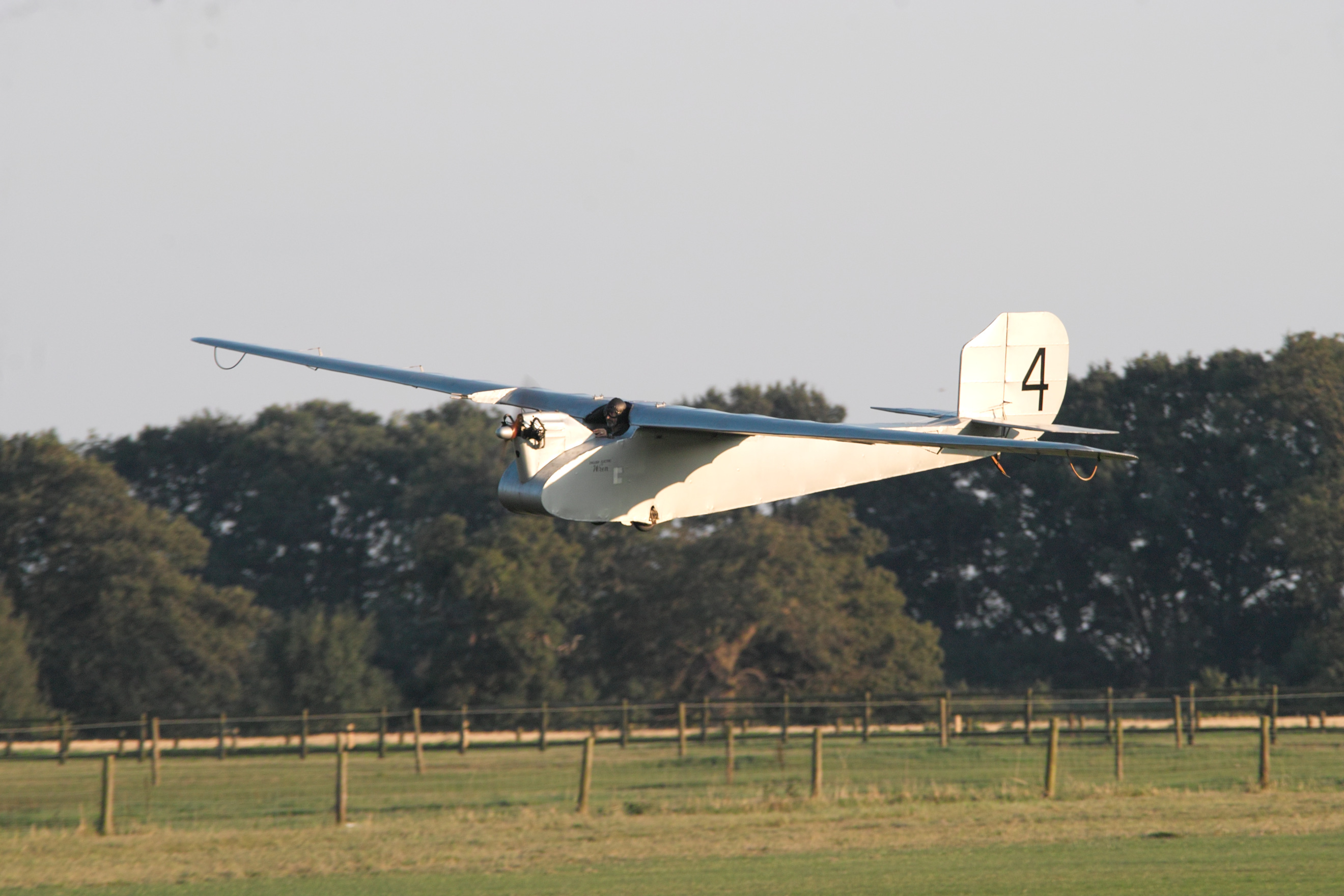
- English Electric Wren at Shuttleworth, 2014

General information
- Type: Ultralight monoplane
- Manufacturer: English Electric Company Limited
- Designer: W. O. Manning
- Number built: 3

History
- First flight: 1921

The English Electric Wren was a 1920s British ultralight monoplane built by the English Electric Company Limited at Lytham St Annes, Lancashire.

== History ==
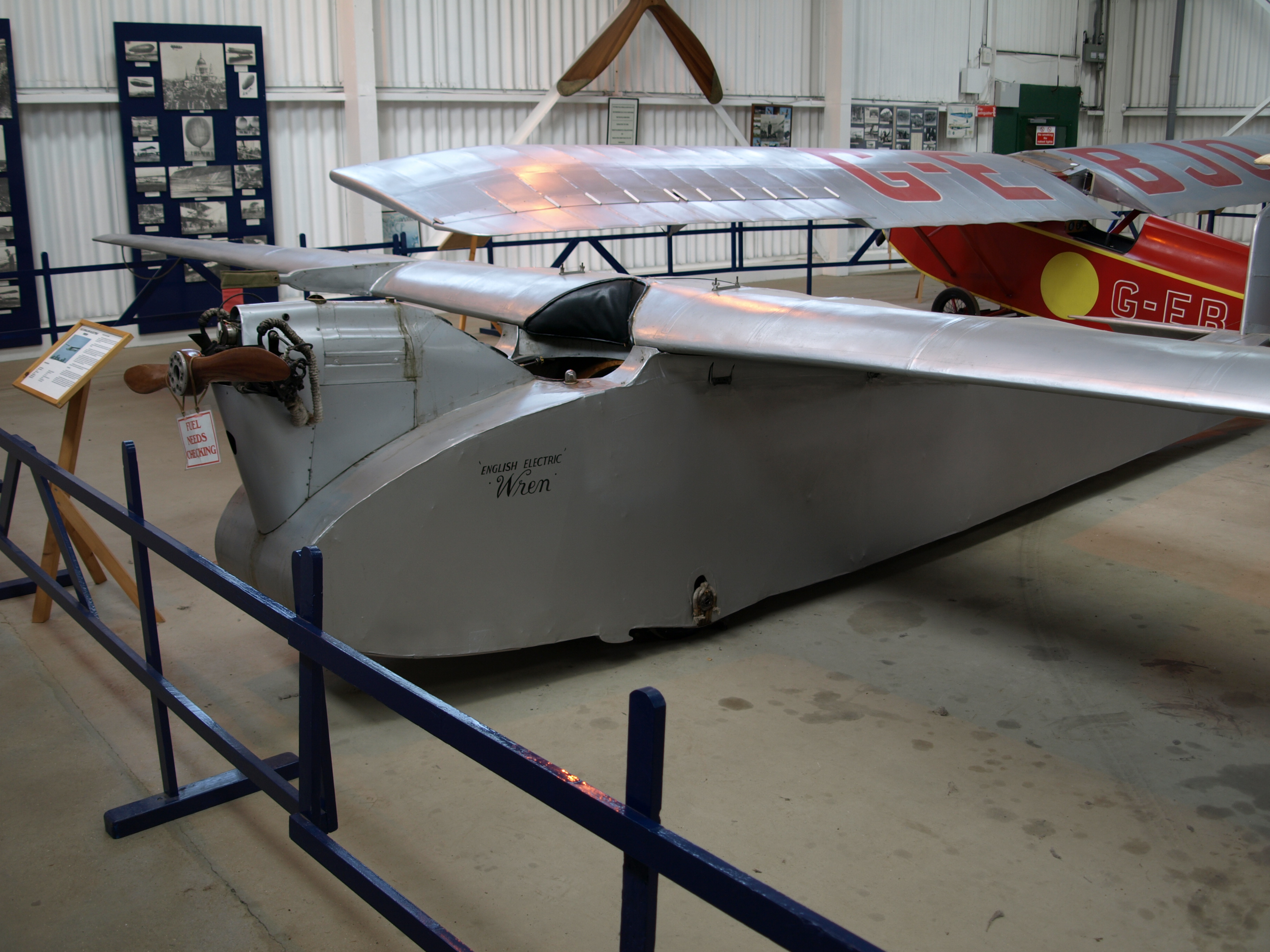
English Electric Wren at the Shuttleworth Collection

The Wren, designed by W. O. Manning, is a lightweight motor-glider. Manning was a designer of flying boats and decided to try a simpler project. The Wren was a single-engined high-wing monoplane with an empty weight of only 232 lb (105 kg). The first aircraft (Serial Number J6973) was built in 1921 for the Air Ministry. Interest in building very light aircraft was encouraged at the time by a £500 prize offered by the Duke of Sutherland (who was the Under-Secretary of State for Air). The entrants had to build the most economical light single-seat aircraft. Another incentive was a £1,000 prize offered by the Daily Mail for the longest flight by a motor-glider with an engine of not more than 750 cc. Two aircraft were built for the 1923 Lympne light aircraft trials in October 1923. The Wren shared the first prize with the ANEC I when it covered 87.5 miles (140.8 km) on one Imperial gallon (4.5 litres) of fuel.

In 1957 the third aircraft was rebuilt using parts of the second aircraft and registered G-EBNV. Painted with competition number 4 it is still airworthy and is on public display at the Shuttleworth Collection at Old Warden Aerodrome in Bedfordshire.

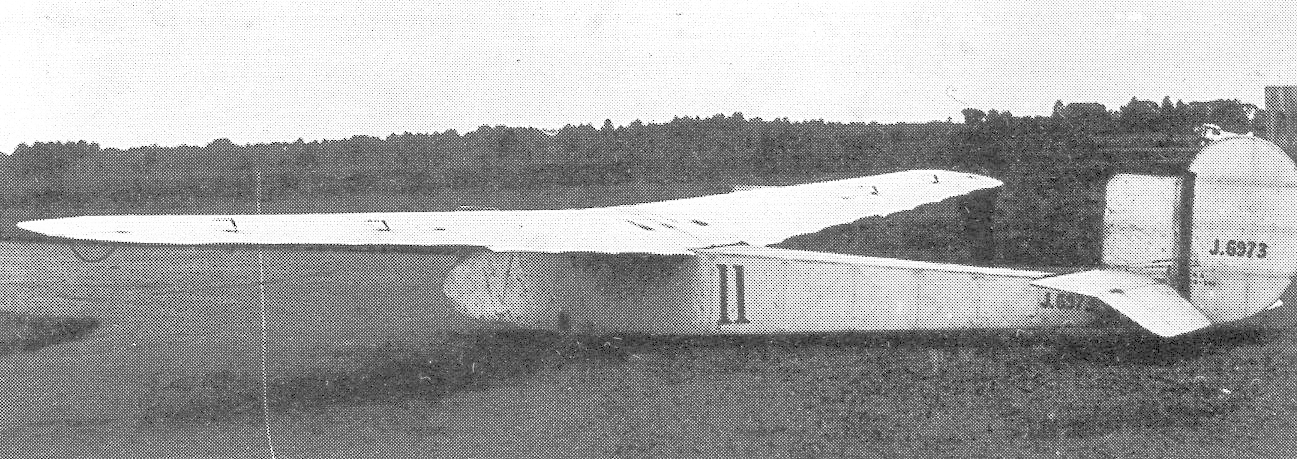
English ElectricWren J6973, September 1923

== Specifications (Wren) ==
Data from Jackson

General characteristics

- Crew: 1
- Length: 24 ft 3 in (7.39 m)
- Wingspan: 37 ft 0 in (11.28 m)
- Height: 4 ft 9 in (1.45 m)
- Wing area: 145 sq ft (13.5 m^{2})
- Empty weight: 232 lb (105 kg)
- Max takeoff weight: 420 lb (191 kg)
- Powerplant: 1 × ABC 8 hp 2-cylinder air-cooled horizontally-opposed piston engine, 8 hp (6.0 kW)
- Propellers: 2-bladed fixed-pitch propeller

Performance

- Maximum speed: 50 mph (80 km/h, 43 kn)
- Endurance: 1 hour 30 minutes
- Rate of climb: 180 ft/min (0.91 m/s)

== See also ==
Aircraft of comparable role, configuration, and era

- ANEC I
