= Vickers Valentia =

WWI-designed 1920s British flying boat

Valentia
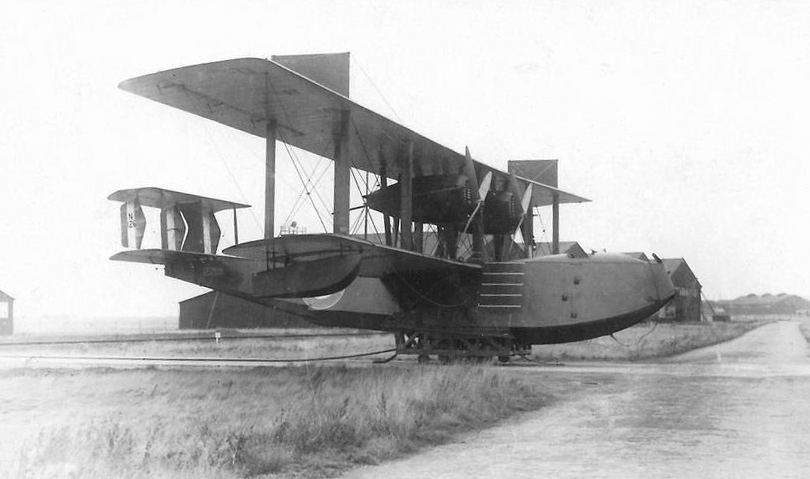
- Valentia (N126) at the Marine and Armament Experimental Establishment, Isle of Grain, April 1923.

General information
- Type: Flying boat
- National origin: United Kingdom
- Manufacturer: Vickers-Armstrongs; S. E. Saunders (hull only)
- Status: Prototype
- Primary user: Royal Air Force
- Number built: 3

History
- Introduction date: 1921
- First flight: 5 March 1921
- Retired: 1924

The Vickers Valentia was a 1920s British flying boat designed during the First World War.

== History ==
Three Valentia prototypes were built by Vickers Limited at their Barrow works (possibly Walney Island), having been ordered in May 1918 as a potential replacement for the Felixstowe F.5. The hull was built by S.E.Saunders works at Cowes. The first of the three (Serial Number N124) flew on 5 March 1921, when Stanley Cockerell began test-flying it over the Solent. N124 was damaged on landing in June 1921 and dismantled, the second (N125) forced landed on its delivery flight 15 March 1922 The third flying boat (N126) delivered in 1923 was used for trials until it was withdrawn from use in November 1924.

The name was later re-used for a transport aircraft, the Vickers Type 264 Valentia.

== Operators ==
United Kingdom

- Royal Air Force
  - Marine and Armament Experimental Establishment
  - Marine Aircraft Experimental Establishment

== Fate ==
Decommissioned, the hull of Vickers Valentia (N126) was moved to Felixstowe Ferry where the hull of Fairey N.4 Atalanta (N119) was also recorded as a house boat.

== Specifications (Valentia) ==

Data from Vickers Aircraft since 1908

General characteristics

- Crew: 5
- Length: 58 ft 0 in (17.68 m)
- Wingspan: 112 ft 0 in (34.14 m)
- Empty weight: 10,000 lb (4,536 kg)
- Gross weight: 21,300 lb (9,662 kg)
- Powerplant: 2 × Rolls-Royce Condor water-cooled V12 engine, 650 hp (480 kW) each

Performance

- Maximum speed: 105 mph (169 km/h, 91 kn)
- Endurance: 4 hr 30 min
- Time to altitude: 9.5 min to 6,000 ft (1,800 m)

Armament

- Guns: Provision for two Lewis guns. Tested with COW 37 mm gun

== See also ==
- Canadian Vickers – Felixstowe F-III built for transatlantic attempt

Aircraft of comparable role, configuration, and era

- Felixstowe F.5
- Phoenix P.5 Cork
- Short N.3 Cromarty
- Supermarine Swan
- Saunders A.14
