= English Electric Kingston =

P.5 Kingston
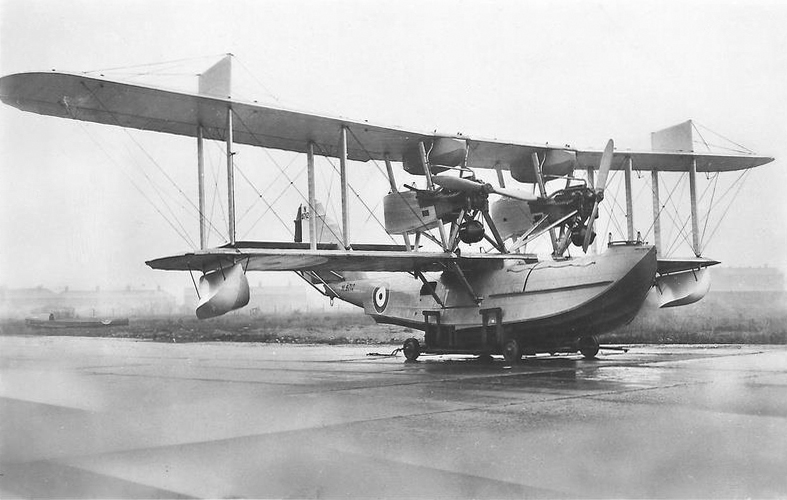
- Kingston II (N.9712) at Lytham, 1925.

General information
- Type: Reconnaissance and anti-submarine flying boat
- Manufacturer: English Electric
- Designer: W.O. Manning
- Status: Prototype
- Primary user: Royal Air Force
- Number built: 6

History
- First flight: 1924

The English Electric P.5 Kingston was a British twin-engined biplane flying boat built by English Electric. When the English Electric Company was formed in 1918 from several companies, the Phoenix Dynamo Manufacturing Company brought with it the two prototype Phoenix P.5 Cork reconnaissance flying boats. Redesigned, the Cork reappeared as the English Electric P.5 Kingston with a production order for five aircraft.

== Design and development ==
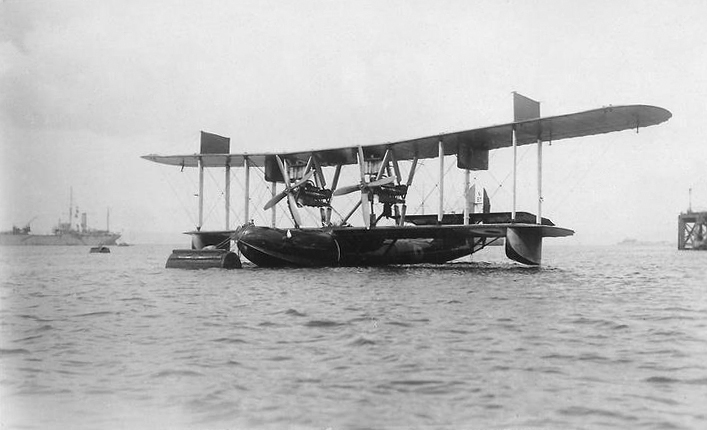
Phoenix P.5 Cork MII (N.87) with Linton Hope hull.

In 1922 W.O. Manning led a team of designers to produce a coastal patrol and anti-submarine flying boat to meet Air Ministry Specification 23/23. They based the design on the Cork and the resulting aircraft looked similar but the hull was designed to the latest standard. The Kingston also had redesigned wingtip floats, extended upper-wing ailerons, and a larger fin and rudder than the Cork.

In January 1923 the Air Ministry contracted English Electric to build a prototype and the new design was built at Preston, then moved by road to Lytham for flight trials. Following an inspection by the Ministry on 12 May 1924 the prototype, serial number N168, was launched into the Ribble Estuary on 22 May and after twenty-minutes of trials on the water was taken out into the Estuary for its first flight. At the point of takeoff N168 suddenly stopped "amidst a cloud of spray" and then began to sink. The crew had been thrown out and the aircraft floated with its wings on the surface. While the crew were being rescued the aircraft had floated away and was recovered by a tug which beached N168. The flying-boat was patched up and the water pumped out and by the evening had been refloated using a tug. While being towed by the tug the strong current struck the pier and it had to be beached again, it was recovered to the company slipway the following day. The investigation concluded that the flying-boat had hit some flotsam.

Despite the accident the Air Ministry ordered four more flying-boats to be designated the Kingston Mk. I. The first Kingston I N9709 was ready a few months later, only small changes were made from the prototype including a slightly larger beam and two-bladed propellers. The flying-boat was delivered by rail to the Marine Aircraft Experimental Establishment at Felixstowe in November 1924 for acceptance trials. Although the flying-boat met the type and air-handling requirements it did not meet the Ministries' requirements for seaworthiness. Modifications were made to N9709 for improvements including four-bladed propellers. On 25 May 1925, just after becoming airborne the engines left their mountings and the wing structure failed causing cracks in the hull, the aircraft floated and the crew escaped without injury.

The second Kingston I N9710 first flew on 13 November 1925 at Lytham and was flown to RAF Calshot for service trials along with the third flying-boat N9711. The fourth flying-boat N9712 was dismantled and the hull moved to RAE Farnborough to enable tests to be carried out.

This fourth aircraft re-emerged as N9712 (Note: It has been presumed that the superstructure of N9712 was kept and assembled on a new hull, but no definite proof exists.) at Lytham with a new duralumin hull and became the sole Kingston II. Test-flown at Felixstowe it failed to perform; in 1930 the metal hull was used for tests at Farnborough.

The last aircraft to be built, N9713, had a completely redesigned hull, but this reverted to wooden construction, and was known as the Kingston III. Although more successful than the others the Kingston III was kept by the Marine Aircraft Experimental Establishment for experimental work and sometimes as a crew ferry. It was intended to produce a metal-hulled variant of the Kingston III but the day the Kingston III left Lytham for Felixstowe in 1926 the company closed its aircraft department. Following some wartime sub-contract work the aircraft department was not reformed until 1944.

== Operators ==
United Kingdom

- Royal Air Force
  - Marine Aircraft Experimental Establishment, Felixstowe

== Specifications (Kingston I) ==
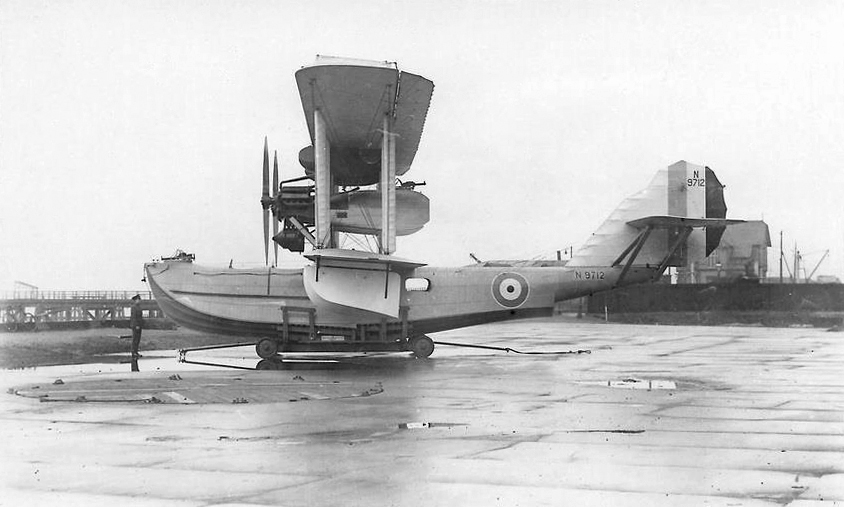
Kingston II (N.9712), at Felixstowe. "Fighting tops" located in the rear of the engine nacelles.

Data from British Flying Boats.

General characteristics

- Crew: six (pilot, observer, three gunners, engineer)
- Length: 52 ft 9 in (16.08 m)
- Wingspan: 85 ft 6 in (26.07 m)
- Height: 20 ft 11 in (6.38 m)
- Wing area: 1,282.5 sq ft (119.2 m^{2})
- Empty weight: 9,130 lb (4,150 kg)
- Max takeoff weight: 14,508 lb (6,595 kg)
- Powerplant: 2 × Napier Lion IIIB 12-cylinder piston, 450 hp (336 kW) each

Performance

- Maximum speed: 104.8 mph (169 km/h, 91 kn)
- Endurance: 8–9 hours
- Service ceiling: 9,060 ft (2,760 m)

Armament

- Guns: 3× 0.303 in (7.7 mm) Lewis machine gun
- Bombs: Up to 1,040 lb (472 kg) of bombs

== See also ==
Related development

- Felixstowe F.3
- Felixstowe F.5
- Fairey N.4

Aircraft of comparable role, configuration, and era

- Boeing XPB
- Naval Aircraft Factory PN
- Short Cromarty
- Supermarine Swan
- Supermarine Southampton
- Vickers Valentia
