= RAF Coastal Area =

Former formation of the Royal Air Force

Royal Air Force Coastal Area
- Active: 1919 – 14 July 1936
- Country: United Kingdom
- Branch: Royal Air Force
- Role: Anti-submarine warfare Commerce raiding Aerial reconnaissance Air-sea rescue Weather reconnaissance
- Part of: Royal Air Force

RAF Coastal Area was a formation within the Royal Air Force (RAF). Founded in 1919, it was to act as the RAF's premier maritime arm. It was replaced by RAF Coastal Command on 14 July 1936.

== Beginnings of maritime aviation ==
The Committee of Imperial Defence (CID) met in 1909 and decided the direction that British air power would take in the early 20th century. As far as maritime air power was concerned, First Sea Lord of the Admiralty Winston Churchill, an advocate of the aircraft in military affairs, pushed for development. Under pressure from the services, both the Royal Navy and British Army, the Government increased spending and the aviation budget rose from £9,000 in 1909 to £500,000 by 1913.

Before the First World War the Naval Staff had a positive attitude to aviation and their interests were to grow during the course of the 1914–1918 conflict. Before the war budgetary concerns and constraints had kept the development of aviation low. While the War Office attempted to save money by encouraging civilian aviators such as Samuel Cody to carry out research on their behalf, mostly in the field of reconnaissance and artillery co-operation, the Admiralty undertook its own trials with aircraft built to its own specifications. Between 1909 and 1911 the Navy took advantage of huge strides in military development of aircraft, having a significant tradition in research and development and a strong regard to long-range navigation and reconnaissance. Attention swiftly turned to ship-borne aircraft. Lieutenant Charles Rumney Samson achieved the feat of flying off a ship in December 1911. On 2 January 1912 Lieutenant H.A Williamson, a submarine officer, who held a Royal Aero Club Certificate submitted a paper dealing with ship-borne aircraft and their use for anti-submarine warfare (ASW). The Royal Naval Air Service (RNAS) factored these aspects of naval air warfare into its development of naval aviation.

The Navy was quick to begin experiments to see if surface vessels and submarines could be detected from the air, and started this research in July 1912 at Harwich and Rosyth. The use of wireless telegraphy and bomb dropping was well in advance of the War Office. The Royal Flying Corps (RFC) carried out bomb dropping experiments but refused to respond to Admiralty requests for collaboration, this was as late as August 1914.

The Naval Air Wing was renamed the RNAS officially in July 1914 and affirmed its independence from any other air service. The Admiralty introduced new types of aircraft and was enthusiastic about continuing development and striving to improve all aspects of aircraft design. They encouraged competition among private firms within the design parameters set by the Admiralty. The RFC, on the other hand, was reliant on the Royal Aircraft Factory and a lack of competition led to its equipment being over-standardised, inflexible in design approach which generally retarded progress in development. The RNAS was better prepared to carry out effective detection operations at sea and to conduct attacks using bombs against naval and land targets than the RFC.

=== First World War ===
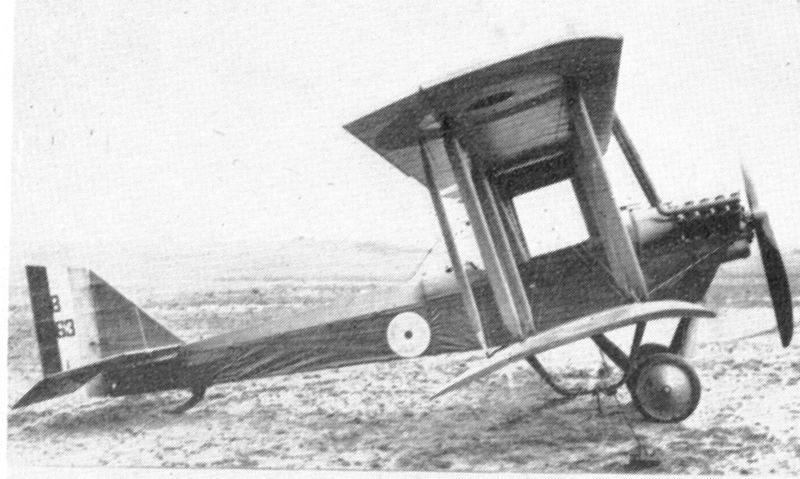
The Airco DH.6, the world's first ASW aircraft.

The First World War was the first indication that a specialised maritime service was needed. During the War, the RNAS was primarily responsible for operations at sea. There was some confusion and debate over what type of aircraft would be suitable for multi-purpose operations. The Germans favoured airships which carried the advantages of long-range, heavy lift capacity for maritime missions while the British were debating the use of flying boats and seaplanes. Seaplanes were smaller, handier and cheaper, while flying boats were long-range but more expensive to build and operate. Operating aircraft over sea created problems. Few forces had the doctrine or capability to deployment their charges on effective sea operations despite manoeuvres involving aircraft being carried out in 1913. Still, aircraft were the mainstay of British maritime air power during the First World War. The most important contribution made by aviation in maritime operations was ASW defence. It was in this role that the Coastal Area and RNAS proved decisive during the Great War.

The submarine, in the shape of the German U-boat, and the aircraft, threatened the status quo of maritime warfare, threatening to displace the battleship as the leading maritime weapon and the cornerstones of naval supremacy. For the British, this meant their vulnerable trade routes in the Atlantic Ocean could be threatened by submarines, and later aircraft. By 1916, after the Battle of Jutland, the Germans were forced to concede that the Imperial German Navy's surface fleet could not challenge the strength of the Royal Navy on the high seas, so great faith was placed in the U-boat to strangle British supply lines in the Atlantic. The U-boats achieved great success in the sinking of Merchant vessels. In 1916 Admiral John Jellicoe claimed that the Germans could achieve victory in the Atlantic and force Britain to terms. The situation had become so bad, and militarily embarrassing, that the RNAS was ordered to concentrate solely on ASW. The turning point in the Atlantic came when escorted convoy systems came in, and merchant ships ceased sailing independently. Added to the system was aircraft, which although incapable of sinking a submarine, could render valuable psychological damage to U-boat crews and provide reconnaissance support which eliminated the U-boat threat.

Despite the preference for flying boats and seaplanes, non-rigid blimps were also developed for anti-submarine patrol, the airships being built in a number of types, such as the SS class, the SST class, the SSP class, and the SSZ class. For flying boats, having started initially with Curtiss H boats bought from the United States, a modified version with a new, more seaworthy hull, was designed by RNAS Commander John Porte at the Seaplane Experimental Station at Felixstowe, and these aircraft became known as the Felixstowe F.1, Felixstowe F.2, and Felixstowe F.3, culminating in the Felixstowe F.5 of 1918. These, along with the blimps, were to make a valuable contribution to the protection of convoys.

Unrestricted submarine warfare made aircraft more important than ever in the war against the U-boats. By 1917 some 39 seaplane and 26 aircraft stations in Britain were all assigned to ASW operations. By December 1918 Britain's land-based coastal air forces was to have consisted of 353 flying boats and seaplanes and 920 land-based aircraft. The actual figures obtained were 305 and 382 respectively, but the clear intended expansion was an indication of air power's importance in trade and maritime defence.

The figures and statistics for the coastal air force's impact on the U-boat fleet are disputed. Air Ministry figures claimed aircraft sighted 361 U-boats, attacked 236 and sank 10. It is unlikely that these figures are correct owing to the lack of capable offensive weapons. But 'scarecrow' tactics did result in 96 sightings and 46 attacks. U-boat crews, ignorant of aircraft's capabilities, were often forced to dive to escape observation and the attention of escorting destroyer screens which aircraft could direct for the kill. By 1918 only six convoys under escort by aircraft were attacked. One unnamed U-boat captain stated that "aircraft are our worst enemy". By the end of the war, British maritime air power was the most advanced in the world. Totalling a maximum of 3,000 aircraft (in all services), 55,000 aircrew and 12 aircraft handling ships, such as HMS Engadine, HMS Campania, and HMS Argus, (later called aircraft carriers), air power had indicated what it was capable of in naval warfare.

With wireless and new aircraft such as the DH.6 now available, effective ASW missions could be carried out to the extent that aircraft became one of the core instruments in trade defence. Co-operation was also a breeding ground for tactical doctrine. But the surrender of Germany in November 1918 and mass demobilisation saw maritime aviation enter terminal decline for the next 20 years.

By 1918 the RNAS had made far more contributions to long-range maritime air operations than either the RFC or its successor the RAF. In August 1914 the primary role for the maritime services was air defence from enemy attack, maritime reconnaissance, and ASW. ASW was considered the most important. During the course of the coming war, the RFC would be mainly responsible for over-land operations, whilst the RNAS partook in all aspects of aerial warfare; strategic air defence, strategic bombing, ASW and fleet reconnaissance.

Prior to the formation of the RAF in April 1918, maritime air operations were the responsibility of the RNAS. When the RAF was formed in April 1918, these operations became their domain. No. 10 Group RAF was given the task. In September 1919 RAF Coastal Area was formed as the Air Ministry's maritime arm. After the formation of the Air Ministry and the RAF in April 1918, Coastal Area was subordinated to the new service but after the war received little encouragement or assistance from the Air Ministry for developing their service.

== Ignoring past lessons ==
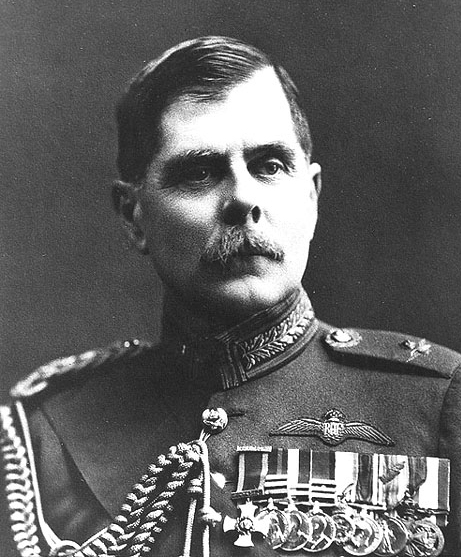
Trenchard's struggle with the Admiralty resulted in the Air Ministry focusing more on strategic bombing, at the expense of ASW.

Despite the fact that Britain had been caused severe difficulty by the U-boat campaign in the First World War, the Admiralty completely ignored the threat of the submarine until the late 1930s. The Royal Navy had founded its traditional defensive strength on the battleship, which was used to defend its waters and merchant fleets. This weapon had proved incapable of countering U-boats during the war. The Admiralty also ignored the damage caused by submarines and regarded them as ineffective defensive weapons. Given the disarmament of Germany there seemed little offensive threat. Even after the rise of Adolf Hitler and the birth of the Third Reich, there seemed little inclination or will toward rearming Britain's ASW air forces. To the contrary, the Anglo-German Naval agreement signed in June 1935, allowed the Germans to build German U-boat strength to one-third the displacement tonnage of the entire Royal Navy. In fact, the Germans had been developing submarines as early as 1922, despite the Treaty of Versailles and the banning of German military submarines.

In the RAF, which in April 1918 was created by merging the RNAS and RFC, there still existed a place for maritime aviation. However the Navy expected the RAF to hand back the naval component after the war, which was reasonable considering the indifference the RAF displayed towards the submarine campaign in the 1914–1918 conflict. The failure of the RAF to do so started a power struggle between the Air Ministry on one side and the Admiralty and War Office on the other. The Air Ministry found its existence threatened and resolved to fend off the attempts of the Admiralty and War Office to break up the RAF and recover the RFC and RNAS by offering a cheaper, innovative alternative strategy for British air power in the future. The RAF, under the direction of a new Chief of the Air Staff (CAS) Hugh Trenchard, adopted the strategic bombing theory of air power theorists such as Giulio Douhet, who argued that air power could win wars on its own, bypassing the need for armies and navies. Maritime aviation and the valuable lessons of the first European war were cast aside, but crucially the appointment of Trenchard and his views, the removal of the weaker personalities such as CAS Frederick Sykes, and the continued support of Winston Churchill saved the Air Ministry from being disbanded. In July 1923, Trenchard sent a memorandum to AOC (Air Officer Commanding) Central and AOC Coastal Areas advising them the strategic area offensive would be the dominating policy of future conflicts, and the Coastal services would take part in such operations. In doing so Trenchard stated openly that the goals of the Air Arm in no way conflicted with either the Army or Navy. This meant that maritime, or "auxiliary" squadrons would be radically reduced to allow the focus on land-based bombers and fighters for air attack and defence in line with the RAF's "non-specialisation policy". In the 1920s, Bomber and Fighter forces were expanded while Coastal Area was continually downgraded. By 1920 little remained of Coastal Area Air Forces.

With Trenchard's policy unequivocal, for both military and political reasons, maritime aviation was in danger of being disbanded altogether. In April 1923 shore-based strength amounted to a solitary squadron (Nb: possibly No. 230 Squadron RAF). A year later all that remained was one flight of torpedo bombers. Only five squadrons of ship-borne aircraft remained by April 1924. These reductions were not uniform across the service. The percentage reduction of the maritime component was far greater than non-maritime elements. The ten year rule (that there would be no major war for ten years) laid down in 1919 ensured the RAF was to be reduced by 50 percent, which downsized the maritime squadrons on the RAF to just five percent of its November 1918 strength. The Air Ministry justified this reduction of maritime aviation in light of the 'breakthrough' in ASDIC (sonar), and underwater detection technology capable of locating submarines. As 86 percent of the First World War maritime air effort had been expended on ASW it argued it was reasonable for a reduction in maritime expenditure in light of the technology now available.

The lack of ASW development during the 1920s and 1930s was not entirely the fault of the Air Ministry. The struggle between the Admiralty and Air Ministry continued into the 1930s and the Admiralty lost sight of why it was pursuing its own air service for the Navy. It became a matter of getting revenge over the RAF for its success in defeating earlier attempts to break up the Air Force. It succeeded in forcing the return of the Fleet Air Arm (FAA) from the RAF in 1937, but made no effort to develop ASW formations. Instead it continued to believe in the supremacy of the capital ship and the FAA was meant to be suitable for fleet actions only. It was a mistake most of the major powers, in particular the Imperial Japanese Navy, made during the lead up to the Second World War.

Throughout the inter war period, the Admiralty had been continually sceptical of the aircraft's ability to sink a surface vessel. It was regarded as merely a reconnaissance technology. This resulted in a lack of development of a maritime strike force and lost another early opportunity to garner support for Coastal Area/Coastal Command. In summation First Sea Lord David Beatty, 1st Earl Beatty proclaimed "[I] know of no operation in which the Navy and the Air [Service] have to co-operate in which the Navy would not play the more important role than the air service".

In 1936, almost 18 years after the end of the First World War, there was a major change in the Command structure of the RAF. Several Expansion Schemes were heading at such pace to rearm the British military in face of the Nazi threat that "Area" formations were now to be called "Commands". Fighter and Bomber Areas became Fighter and Bomber Command and Coastal Area was renamed Coastal Command. Its headquarters was located as Lee-on-Solent. Air Marshal Arthur Longmore, AOC Coastal Area oversaw the renaming and handed over command to Air Marshal Philip Joubert de la Ferté on 24 August 1936.

== See also ==
- List of Royal Air Force commands

== Bibliography ==
- Ashworth, Chris. RAF Coastal Command: 1936–1969. Patrick Stephens Ltd. 1992. ISBN 1-85260-345-3
- Blair, Clay. Hitler's U-Boat War: The Hunters 1939–1942 Cassel & Co. 1996. ISBN 0-304-35260-8
- Bowyer, Chaz (1979). Coastal Command at War. Shepperton, Surrey, UK: Ian Allan Ltd. ISBN 0-7110-0980-5.
- Buckley, John. The RAF and Trade Defence, 1919–1945: Constant Endeavour. Ryburn Publishing. 1995. ISBN 1-85331-069-7
- Buckley, John. Air Power in the Age of Total War. UCL Press. 1998. ISBN 1-85728-589-1.
- Corum, James. The Luftwaffe: Creating the Operational Air War, 1918–1940. Kansas University Press. 1997. ISBN 978-0-7006-0836-2
- de la Ferté, Philiip Joubert. The Birds and the Fishes: The Story of Coastal Command. Hutchinson. 1960. (No ISBN)
- Delve, Ken. The Source Book of the RAF. Shrewsbury, Shropshire, UK: Airlife Publishing Ltd., 1994. ISBN 1-85310-451-5.
- Forczyk, Robert. Fw 200 Condor Vs Atlantic Convoys, 1941–1943. Osprey Publications. 2010. ISBN 978-1-84603-917-1
- Goulter, Christina. A Forgotten Offensive: Royal Air Force Coastal Command's Anti-Shipping Campaign, 1940–1945. Frank & Cass. London. 2005. ISBN 0-7146-4147-2.
- Hendrie, Andrew. The Cinderella Service: RAF Coastal Command 1939–1945. Pen & Sword Aviation. 2006. ISBN 978-1-84415-346-6.
- Hyde, H. Montgomery. British Air Policy Between the Wars, 1918–1939. Heineman 1977. ISBN 0-434-47983-7.
- March, Daniel J. British Warplanes of World War II. Rochester, Kent, UK: Grange Books, 1998. ISBN 1-84013-391-0.
- Nesbit, Roy Conyers. Coastal Command in Action, 1939–1945. Budding Books. 2000 (2nd Edition). ISBN 1-84015-112-9
- Rawlings, John D.R. Coastal, Support and Special Squadrons of the RAF and their Aircraft. London, Jane's Publishing Company Ltd., 1982. ISBN 0-7106-0187-5.
- Saunders, Hilary Aidan St. George and Denis Richards. Royal Air Force, 1939–1945. Volume III: The Fight is Won. Her Majesty's Stationery Office, 1975. ISBN 0-11-771594-8.
- Terraine, John. Business in Great Waters: The U-Boat Wars, 1916–1945. Leo Cooper. London. 1989. ISBN 0-85052-760-0

Preceded by Royal Naval Air Service of the Royal Navy	Coastal Area; 1919–1936	Succeeded by RAF Coastal Command
