= Felixstowe (disambiguation) =

Felixstowe may refer to:

== Places ==
- Felixstowe, a seaside town on the North Sea coast of Suffolk, England
- Port of Felixstowe, a very large container port in Suffolk, England
- Felixstowe Ferry, a hamlet in Suffolk, England

== Aircraft ==
- Felixstowe F.2, a British First World War flying boat
- Felixstowe F.3, a British First World War flying boat
- Felixstowe F.5, a British First World War flying boat
- Felixstowe Fury (serial N123), also known as the Porte Super Baby, was a large British, five-engined triplane flying-boat
- Felixstowe F5L, was one of the Felixstowe F series of flying boats
- Felixstowe Porte Baby, was a British reconnaissance flying boat of the First World War

== Royal Navy ==
- RNAS Felixstowe, renamed in 1918 to Seaplane Experimental Station and disbanded in 1919
- HMS Felixstowe (J126), was a turbine engined Bangor class minesweeper of the Royal Navy

== Other uses ==
- SS Felixstowe

== See also ==
- Felixstow, South Australia, a suburb of Adelaide in the City of Norwood Payneham St Peters
