= No. 231 Squadron RAF =

Defunct flying squadron of the Royal Air Force

- Active: 20 August 1918 - 7 July 1919; 1 July 1940 - 15 January 1944; 8 September 1944 – 15 January 1946
- Country: United Kingdom
- Branch: Royal Air Force
- Type: Flying squadron
- Motto: Prepared to Attack (unofficial)

Insignia
- Squadron Codes: VM (Jul 1940 - Apr 1943)

No. 231 Squadron RAF was a squadron of the Royal Air Force between 1918 and 1946, active in both World War I and World War II in various roles.

== History ==
=== First World War ===
No. 231 Squadron was formed from Nos. 329 and 330 Flights of the seaplane station at the Seaplane Experimental Station at Royal Naval Air Station Felixstowe on 20 August 1918 and flew anti-submarine patrols for the remaining months of the war. On 7 July 1919 it was disbanded.

=== Second World War ===
==== As an army co-operation squadron ====
On 1 July 1940, No. 231 reformed from No. 416 Flight at RAF Newtownards as an army co-operation squadron equipped with Westland Lysanders. In addition to taking part in exercises with the Army, it flew patrols along the border with Éire. In September 1941 conversion to Curtiss Tomahawks began, but a flight of Lysanders was retained until July 1943. In March 1943 the squadron moved to Yorkshire but left a detachment in Ulster until July, and in April North American Mustangs began to arrive. By the time No. 231 joined No. 128 Airfield of Second TAF on 22 July 1943, it was fully equipped with Mustangs, this type having flown the squadron's first offensive operations on 4 July. Shipping and weather reconnaissance missions, defensive patrols and ground attack sorties over northern France were flown until the squadron disbanded on 15 January 1944.

==== In the transport and communications role ====
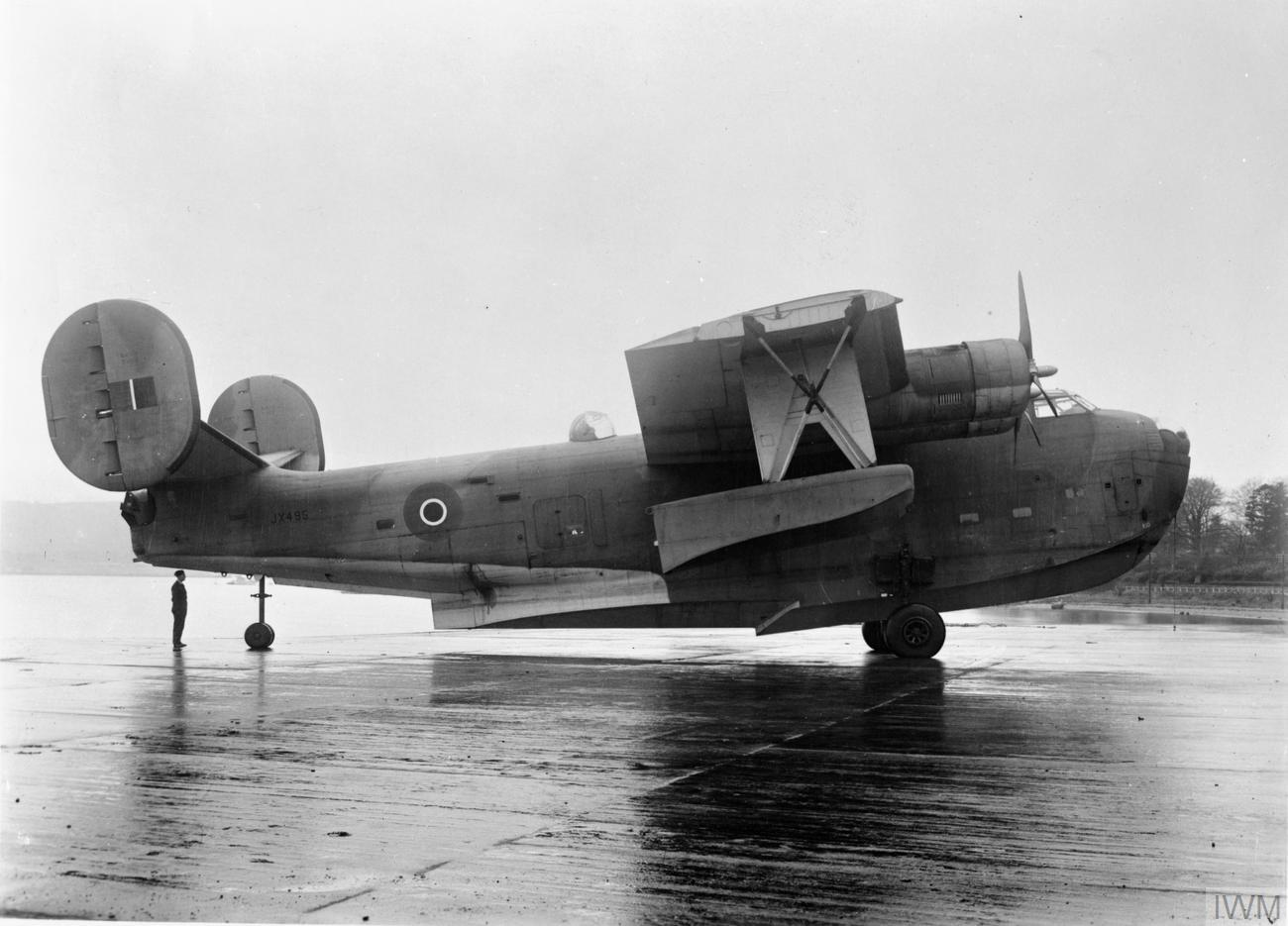
A Coronado GR.I that later served with 231 Sqn.

On 8 September 1944, No. 231 reformed at Dorval, Canada, from No. 45 Group Communications Squadron. No. 45 Group RAF's main task was the ferrying of U.S. and Canadian built aircraft across the Atlantic. It also administrated trans-Atlantic passenger and freight services and No. 231's Coronado flying boats operated between North America, West Africa and the UK, using Largs as its British terminal. Other flights were flown with landplanes, using several of the types available to No. 45 Group as required. In September 1945 the squadron moved to Bermuda, where it disbanded on 15 January 1946.

On 1 December 1945, a flight was formed to train Avro Lancastrian crews at RAF Full Sutton but its task was taken over by the station when No. 231 disbanded, the Lancastrian Flight becoming the Lancastrian Training Unit/No 1699 HCU. Although it was allotted the squadron number on 16 January 1946, training ceased on 28 March 1946.

== Insignia ==
There is no official insignia noted for this squadron. There is however a black-and-white photograph of an unofficial insignia affixed to an entry dated 30 March 1942 in the Pilots Log Book of Kenneth Oliver Peachey. The insignia is of a light coloured horse leaping over a fence from right to left. This is superimposed over a 3 leaf clover. A motto "in hoc signo vinces" appears under the insignia, which would translate as "In this sign you will conquer".

== Aircraft operated ==
From	To	Aircraft	Variant	Note
Aug 1918	Mar 1919	Felixstowe F.2a; Felixstowe F.3		twin-engined reconnaissance flying boats
Nov 1918	Mar 1919	Felixstowe F.5		twin-engined reconnaissance flying boat
Jul 1940	Jul 1943	Westland Lysander	Mk. II, III	Single-engined liaison monoplane
Sep 1941	Jul 1943	Curtiss Tomahawk	Mk. I, IIb	Single-engined fighter
Apr 1943	Jan 1944	North American Mustang	Mk. I	Single-engined fighter
1944–1946	Various (see below)			Transport aircraft
Dec 1945	Jan 1946	Avro Lancaster	Mk. III	Four-engined transport version of the bomber
Jan 1946	Jan 1946	Avro Lancastrian	C2	Four-engined transport

From September 1944 the squadron operated various different transport aircraft from Dorval:

- Douglas Dakota(1944–1946)
- Lockheed Hudson IIIA (1944–1946)
- Lockheed Hudson VI (1944–1945)
- Consolidated Liberator I, II and II (1944–1946)
- Consolidated Coronado (1944–1946)
- Spartan Executive (1944–1945)
- Martin Marauder(1944–1945)
- C-87 Liberator Express (1945–1946)

== See also ==
- List of Royal Air Force aircraft squadrons
