= El Nouzha Airport =

Former airport in Alexandria, Egypt (1947–2011)

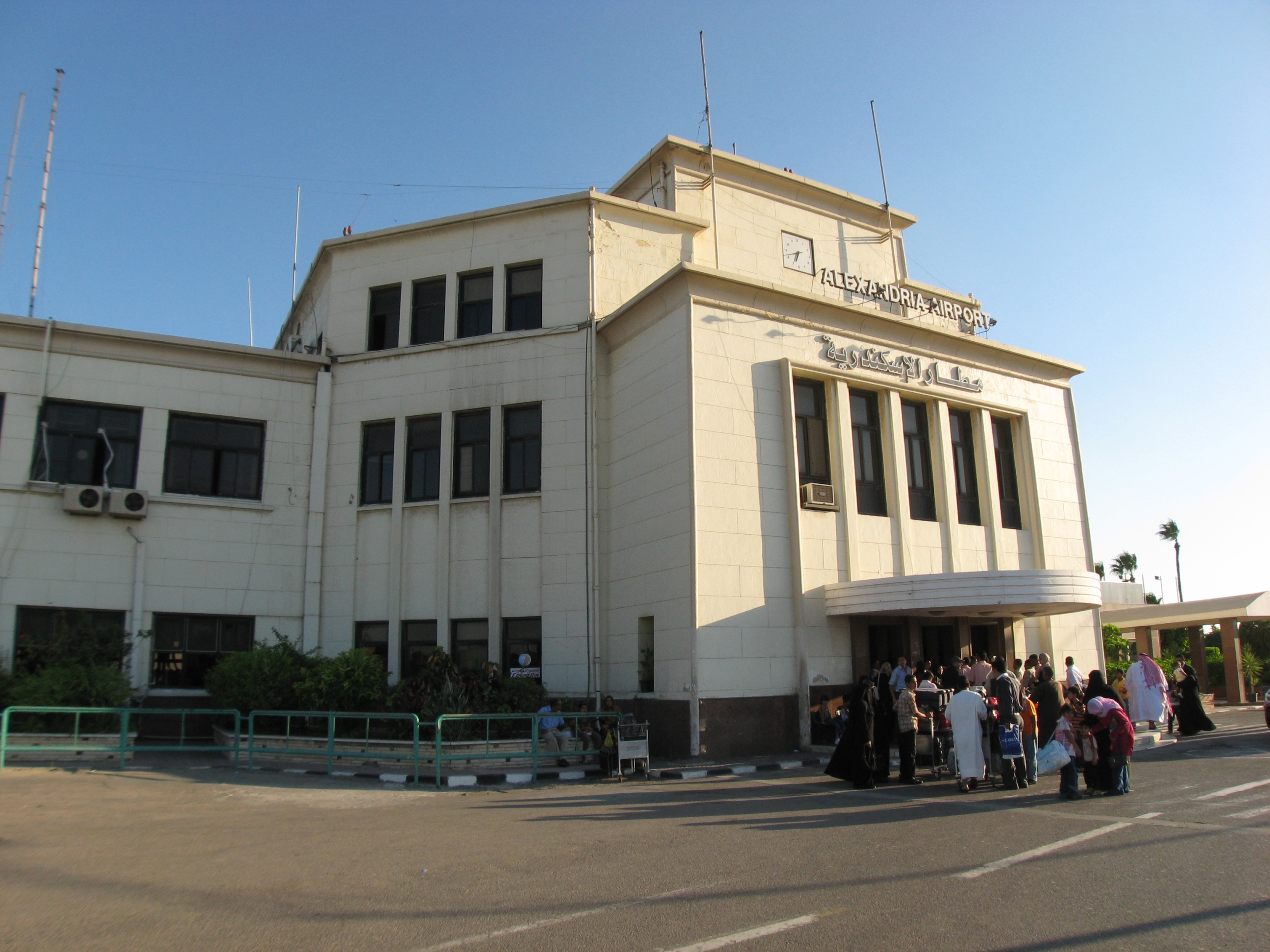
- IATA: ~~ALY~~; ICAO: ~~HEAX~~

Summary
- Airport type: Defunct
- Operator: Alexandria
- Serves: Alexandria
- Opened: 1947
- Closed: 2011 (initially for upgrade, but never reopened)
- Elevation AMSL: −8 ft (−2.4 m)
- Coordinates: 31°11′02″N 029°56′56″E

Maps
- Location of airport in Egypt
- Interactive map of El Nouzha Airport

Runways
| Direction | Length | | Surface |
| Direction | m | ft | Surface |
|---|---|---|---|
| 04/22 | 2,201 | 7,221 | Asphalt |
| 18/36 | 1,801 used as taxi way only | 5,909 | Asphalt |
- Source: DAFIF

El Nouzha Airport was an international airport in Alexandria, Egypt, 7 km (4.3 mi) southeast of the city center.

== History ==
RAF Alexandria, later known as RAF Maryut, hosted a number of Royal Flying Corps and Royal Air Force squadrons during the First and Second World Wars, as well as in the interwar years. The first units stationed at Alexandria were No. 14 Squadron RFC, which was present between 19 and 23 November 1915 with the Royal Aircraft Factory B.E.2C, and No. 17 Squadron RFC, which arrived shortly after, between 11 and 18 December 1915, also equipped with the B.E.2C.

During the late stages of the First World War, a detachment from No. 267 Squadron RAF operated at Alexandria between September 1918 and December 1920 with the Felixstowe F.3. Additional seaplane units were based there in the immediate postwar period, including No. 269 Squadron RAF, which was present between 15 September and 15 November 1919 with the Short 184, and No. 270 Squadron RAF, which was stationed from April to September 1919 flying the Felixstowe F.3, Sopwith Baby, de Havilland DH9 and the Short 184.

In the interwar period, Alexandria became an important base for maritime patrol squadrons. No. 202 Squadron RAF was based there from 9 April 1920 to 16 May 1921 with the Short 184, while No. 204 Squadron RAF was present between 22 October 1935 and 5 August 1936 with the Supermarine Scapa. No. 230 Squadron RAF was also stationed there, initially from 24 October 1935 to 30 July 1936 with the Short Singapore III, and later returned between 6 May 1940 and 19 June 1941 with the Short Sunderland I. Alongside it, No. 228 Squadron RAF was based at Alexandria from 5 June 1939 to 16 June 1941, also operating the Sunderland I.

During the Second World War, RAF Alexandria and RAF Maryut played an active role in reconnaissance and bombing operations during the North African Campaign. No. 113 Squadron RAF was present from 14 to 23 March 1941 with the Bristol Blenheim IV. From Maryut, No. 39 Squadron RAF operated between 15 October and 27 December 1941 with the Martin Maryland I and the Bristol Beaufort I, while detachments from No. 74 Squadron RAF and No. 112 Squadron RAF also served there between 1941 and 1944. Fighter squadrons included No. 94 Squadron RAF, which was based at Maryut from 16 May to 1 June 1942 with the Curtiss Kittyhawk I, and No. 250 (Sudan) Squadron RAF, which flew the Tomahawk IIB between 25 May and 13 June 1941. No. 274 Squadron RAF operated the Hawker Hurricane IIB between 10 September and 26 October 1941, and No. 601 (County of London) Squadron AAF briefly deployed to the base from 23 to 25 June 1942 with the Supermarine Spitfire VC.

Following the war, RAF Maryut was converted to civil use. In 1947 it reopened as El Nouzha Airport.

== Overview ==
The future of the airport was in doubt with the opening of Borg El Arab International Airport. In early 2011, the Egyptian Ministry of Civil Aviation announced major plans to overhaul the airport and its facilities to ensure its future as one of the two commercial airports for Alexandria and Nile Delta region. The renovation project was expected to cost US$12 million, which would have included lengthening the main runway (04/22) by an additional 750 m and the construction of a new passenger terminal to replace the existing aging facility. Due to the length of the old runways, the largest aircraft operating into the airport were the Airbus A320-200, Boeing 737-800, and McDonnell Douglas MD-90.

The airport was closed down by December 2011 to implement the expansion project and development and was scheduled to be reopened end of 2022. As of January 2024, the airport still remained closed. Satellite images showed the airports runways to be resurfaced and extended while the terminal site remains unfinished and abandoned. Since then, it has been announced officially by the government that the airport will close completely and become defunct.

== Airlines and destinations ==
The airport was originally closed for refurbishment and there are no longer any services. The airport previously offered services to domestic destinations within Egypt and cities across the Arab world. Egyptair and its subsidiary Egyptair Express were the largest airlines at the airport, operating over 50 weekly domestic and regional flights with a mixture of Airbus A320-200s and Embraer E-170s.

It was also served by some foreign airlines, including British Mediterranean Airways (BMED) from London–Heathrow.

== See also ==
- Alexandria International Airport (Egypt)
- List of airports in Egypt
- List of the busiest airports in the Middle East
- List of North African airfields during World War II
