= RAF Kalafrana =

- Malta

Site information
- Type: Seaplane base
- Controlled by: United Kingdom

Location
- Coordinates: 35.8194°N 14.5425°E

Site history
- In use: 1917–1946

RAF Kalafrana was a seaplane operations centre on the southernmost tip of Malta between 1917 and 1946 when it was transferred to the Royal Navy. It played an important role in both world wars, starting as a base for anti-submarine and anti-piracy operations, its role being expanded to include Air Sea Rescue (ASR) operations as aircraft usage and accident rates increased in the inter-war years.

== Malta's operating bases ==
The Royal Naval Air Service base was formed early in 1917 when a slipway and seaplane shed was built, a dockyard construction unit moving in by June 1917 to assemble seaplane parts brought in from the UK. By the end of July, five Curtiss H-4 "Small America" flying boats were flown out of Felixstowe, England, to begin patrolling the approaches to Malta. Later they were joined by Short Type 184 seaplanes and two small FBA Type A two-seat flying boats. These were supported by de Havilland DH9s based at the grounds of the Royal Malta Golf Club at Marsa, operating in the anti-submarine role.

The DH9s formed the nucleus of Malta's first shore-based air element, increasing the islands all-weather anti-submarine capability. By January 1923, a dedicated aerodrome was built at Ħal Far, providing a shore base for carrier-based aircraft. These were supplemented by another grass and earth airfield at Ta' Qali in 1940, both of which imposed severe operating restrictions in wet weather. In October 1939, work began on an aerodrome with a paved runway at Luqa.

== Operations and role ==
With the formation of the Royal Air Force on 1 April 1918, the RAF Kalafrana command was formalised under Colonel C. Reynolds. 267 Squadron was formed at Kalafrana on 27 September 1918 from 360, 361, 362 and 363 Flights as an anti-submarine unit flying patrols in the Mediterranean until the end of hostilities. 267 Squadron remained at Malta until being renumbered No. 481 Flight on 1 August 1923.

By December 1936, 701 Naval Air Squadron moved to Kalafrana operating Hawker Ospreys, Fairey 111Fs, Blackburn Sharks, Fairey Seals and Fairey Swordfish. By September 1937, 209 and 210 Squadrons was operating the Short Singapore on anti-piracy patrols for the benefit of British shipping during the Spanish Civil War. By 1940, these were supplemented by anti-submarine Short Sunderlands of 228 Squadron RAF along with Supermarine Walrus flying boats and a float-equipped Fairey Swordfish in the ASR role. A detachment of Short Sunderland Mk.Is from 228 Squadron based at RAF Alexandria operated out of Kalafrana between 10 June and 25 March 1941.

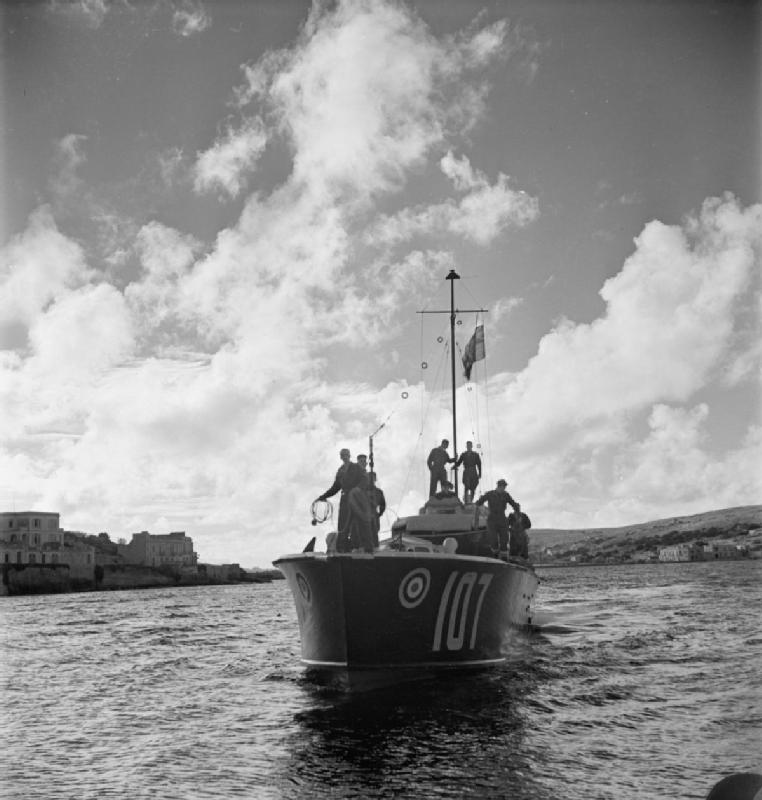
High-speed launch HSL 107 of the RAF Air/Sea Rescue unit returning to its base at Kalafrana

RAF Kalafrana also served as an ASR centre, operating several high-speed launches of various types. A secondary base at Ta' Veccia in St. Paul's Bay gave the maritime section greater coverage and reduced reaction times.

The maintenance wing at RAF Kalafrana operated as the logistical recycling centre for RAF operations in Malta throughout the war. Engines, electronics, airframe parts and armaments from damaged aircraft were recovered, stored, repaired if necessary and reused where possible. Recycling had become critical to the war effort in Malta as the island's isolation increased with the southward shift of Axis forces in late 1941.

== Kalafrana today ==
Between 1946 and 1979, the base was used by the Royal Navy as a general maintenance facility. The original site is buried under what is now the Malta Freeport terminal.
