= No. 232 Squadron RAF =

Defunct flying squadron of the Royal Air Force

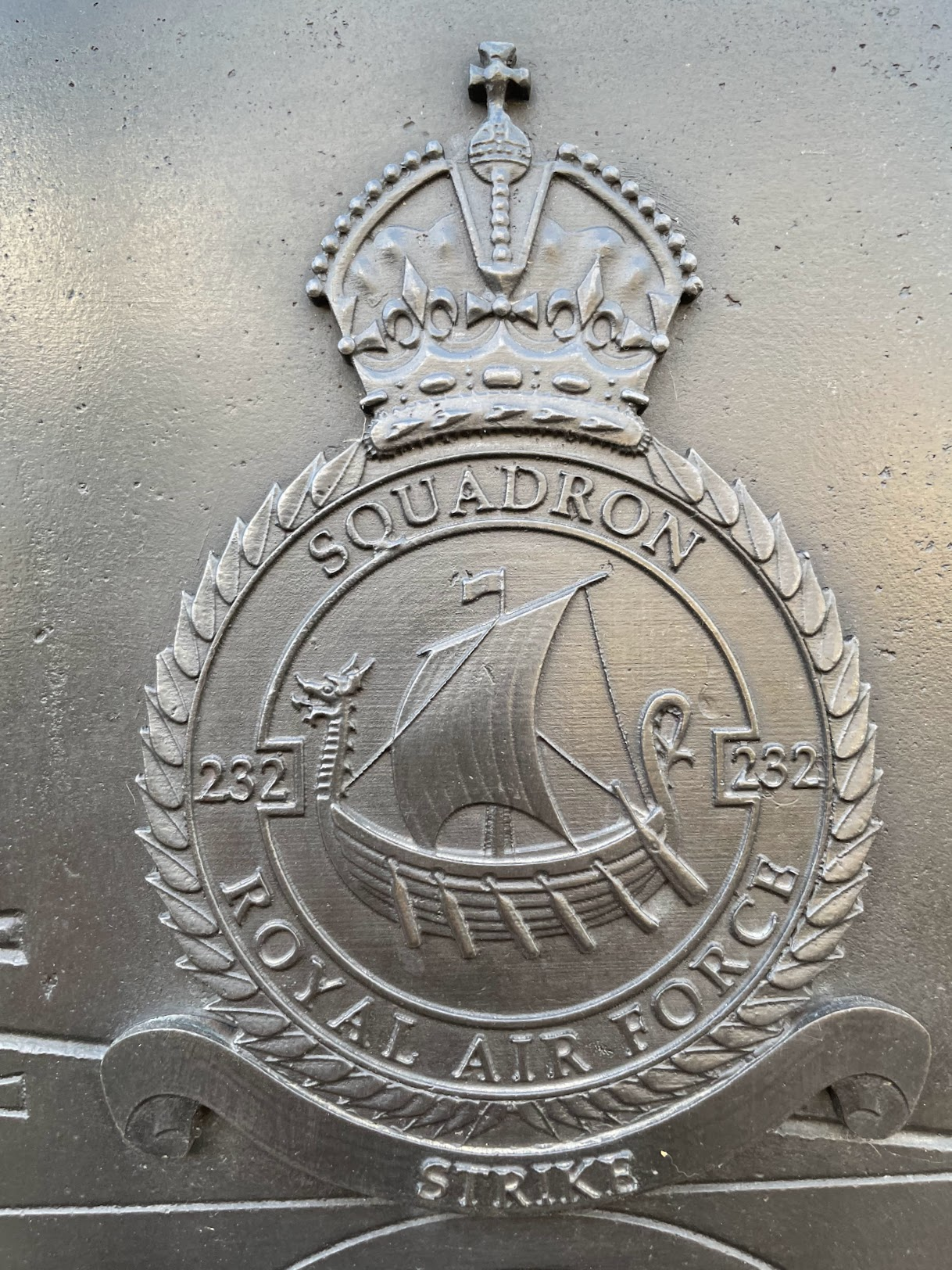
- The squadron's heraldic badge as it appears on the Battle of Britain Monument in London.
- Active: 20 August 1918 – 5 January 1919; 17 July 1940 – 26 February 1942; 10 April 1942 – 31 October 1944; 15 November 1944 – 6 January 1945; 6 January 1945 – 15 August 1946
- Country: United Kingdom
- Branch: Royal Air Force
- Motto: Strike
- Engagements: Battle of Britain

Insignia
- Squadron Badge heraldry: A dragon-ship under sail, oars in action
- Squadron Codes: EF (Jul 1940 - Jul 1941, Apr 1942 - Oct 1944)

No. 232 Squadron of the Royal Air Force was active in both the First and Second World Wars in a variety of roles, having seen action as an anti-submarine patrol, fighter and transport squadron.

== History ==
=== First World War ===
The squadron was formed on 20 August 1918 from No's 333, 334 and 335 Flights at Royal Naval Air Station RNAS Felixstowe and equipped with Felixstowe F.2 and Felixstowe F.3 flying boats. It carried out anti-submarine patrols over the North Sea until the end of the war. It disbanded on 5 January 1919 at Felixtowe.

=== Second World War ===
==== In Scotland ====
Reformed from 'B' Flight of No. 3 Squadron RAF at RAF Sumburgh on 17 July 1940 as a Hawker Hurricane unit, it remained in Scotland on defensive duties until April 1941, when it was earmarked for the Middle East. On 10 May its ground echelon was embarked but the aircrew were carrying out ferrying duties, consequently the ground echelon was disembarked and the squadron moved to RAF Ouston, where it continued its defensive role.

==== In the Far East ====
In November the squadron finally departed for the Middle East, but on arriving in South Africa, it was diverted to the Far East following the Japanese invasion of Malaya. Although the ground echelon arrived in Singapore, by the time the air echelon, aboard HMS Indomitable, was within flying off range, there were no airfields left in British hands, so the squadron flew off to Java on 27 January 1942. Both echelons met up again on 2 February at Palembang in Sumatra, but a further withdrawal to Java was required following the Japanese invasion of Sumatra. By mid February 1942, the situation regarding serviceability was so grave, that No 232 was merged with No 242 and its ground crews were evacuated to Ceylon. Here they were re-allocated to other units and No 232 ceased to exist on 26 February.

==== In North Africa and Italy ====
The squadron reformed at RAF Atcham on 10 April 1942 as a Supermarine Spitfire unit becoming operational in May. In August it moved to RAF Debden, from where it flew offensive sweeps over France including operations supporting the Dieppe Raid, but in September it moved to RAF Turnhouse and began preparing for overseas deployment once again. Leaving the UK in November, the ground echelon arrived in Gibraltar, being joined by the aircrew and aircraft in December. It moved to North Africa in early December under the command of Archibald Winskill and immediately began undertaking ground attack and fighter operations in support of 1st Army, continuing this task until the end of the North African campaign.

In June 1943 the squadron moved to Malta to support the Allied invasion of Sicily before moving onto that island from where it supported the Allied landings on mainland Italy. In September it moved to airfields in Italy, but in December was re-allocated to the Lebanon for defensive duties. Re-equipped with Spitfire IXs, it moved to Corsica in April 1944 and took part in the Allied landing on the South Coast of France, remaining in France to support the Allied advance north until October 1944, when it returned to Naples and disbanded on 31 October.

==== As Transport squadron ====
The squadron reformed on 15 November 1944 at RAF Stoney Cross as a transport unit equipped with Vickers Wellington XVIs until 6 January 1945 when the aircraft were transferred to No 242 Squadron and the ground crews were used to form two other units, No. 243 Squadron RAF rear echelon and No. 1315 Flight RAF. However, the squadron was not disbanded and it immediately received new aircraft, in the form of Consolidated Liberators, and crews. These were taken to India in February where it immediately began carrying out transport flights throughout South-East Asia. In July some Douglas Skymaster Is were received and these were used to fly a Ceylon-Australia service until February 1946, when the Skymasters were returned to the UK, but the service was then resumed in March, the Skymasters having been replaced by Avro Lancastrians. The squadron finally disbanded on 15 August 1946 at Poona, its routes being taken over by civilian airlines in the meantime.
