= Felixstowe F.1 =

British experimental flying boat

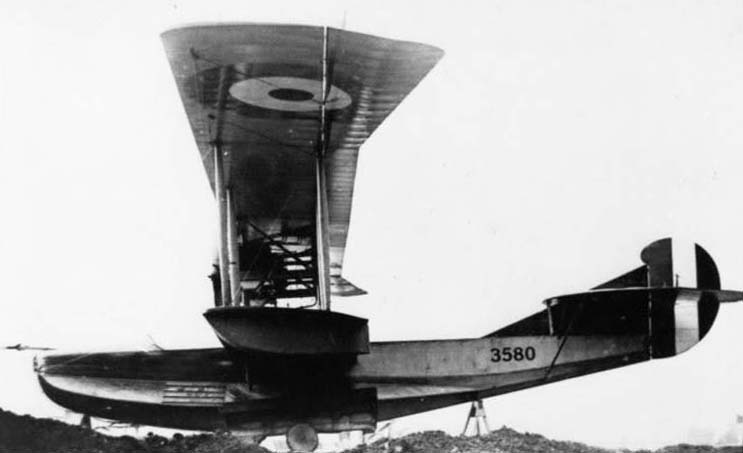
- Prototype Felixstowe F.1 (No.3580)

General information
- Type: Military flying boat
- National origin: United Kingdom
- Manufacturer: RNAS Felixstowe
- Designer: John Cyril Porte
- Primary users: Royal Naval Air Service Royal Air Force
- Number built: 4

History
- Retired: January 1919
- Developed from: Curtiss H-4
- Variant: Felixstowe F.2

The Felixstowe F.1 was a British experimental flying boat designed and developed by Lieutenant Commander John Cyril Porte RN at the naval air station, Felixstowe based on the Curtiss H-4 with a new hull. Its design led to a range of successful larger flying boats that was assistance in promoting Britain as a leader in this field of aviation.

== Development ==
Before the war Porte worked with American aircraft designer Glenn Curtiss on a trans-atlantic flying boat. Due to the start of the Great War he returned to England, eventually to command of the naval air station at Felixstowe, Suffolk. Porte decided that the original Curtiss flying-boats that the Royal Navy acquired could be improved and a number of modifications to in-service flying-boats were made. The modifications had a mixed result so Porte using the experience gained, developed with his Chief Technical Officer John Douglas Rennie, a new single-step hull known as the Porte I.

The Porte I hull used the wings and tail unit of an original H-4 (No.3580) powered by two Hispano-Suiza 8 engines; the new flying boat was designated the Felixstowe F.1. During trials of the F.1 two further steps were added to the hull and a deeper V-shape which greatly improved the performance on takeoff and landing. Porte went on to design a similar hull, the Porte II for the larger Curtiss H-12 flying boat, which became the Felixstowe F.2.

== Operators ==
United Kingdom

- Royal Naval Air Service
  - RNAS Felixstowe
- Royal Air Force
  - Seaplane Experimental Station, Felixstowe - Flying school

== Specifications ==
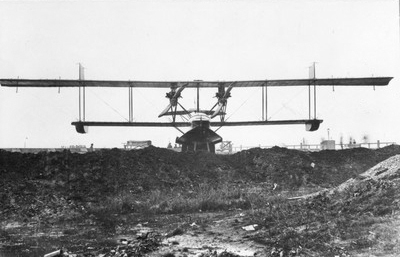
Front elevation, RNAS Felixstowe.

Data from

General characteristics

- Crew: 4
- Length: 36 ft 0 in (10.97 m)
- Upper wingspan: 72 ft (22 m)
- Wing area: 842 sq ft (78.2 m^{2})
- Powerplant: 2 × Hispano-Suiza 8 water-cooled V8, 150 hp (110 kW) each

== See also ==
- British Anzani

Related development

- Curtiss H-4
- Felixstowe F.2

Aircraft of comparable role, configuration, and era

- White & Thompson No. 1 Seaplane

Related lists

- List of flying boats and floatplanes
