= No. 230 Squadron RAF =

Flying squadron of the Royal Air Force

- Squadron badge
- Active: 20 August 1918 – 1 April 1923; 1 December 1934 – 28 February 1957; 1 September 1958 – 3 December 1971; 1 January 1972 – 30 April 1992; 4 May 1992 – 16 October 2025
- Country: United Kingdom
- Allegiance: King Charles III
- Branch: (United Kingdom) Royal Air Force
- Type: Flying squadron
- Role: Helicopter medium-lift support
- Part of: Joint Aviation Command
- Based at: Medicina Lines, British Forces Brunei
- Mottos: Kita chari jauh (Malay for 'We search far')
- Battles: Home Waters (1918)*; Mediterranean (1940–1943)*; Egypt and Libya (1940–1943)*; Greece (1940–1941)*; Malta (1940–1942)*; Eastern Waters (1943–1945)*; North Burma (1944)*; Burma (1945)*; Gulf (1991); Iraq (2003–2011)*; * Honours marked with an asterisk may be emblazoned on the Squadron Standard
- Website: 230 Squadron RAF

Insignia
- Squadron badge heraldry: In front of a palm tree eradicated, a tiger passant guardant. The badge commemorates the squadron's association with Malaya, the travellers palm being a reference to the long flights undertaken and the tiger is said to have been inspired by the labels on the bottles on the local Singaporean beer. Approved by King George VI in February 1937.
- Squadron codes: FV (Apr 1939 – Sep 1939); NM (Sep 1939 – Jan 1943); DX (1942 – Dec 1942); 4X (Apr 1946 – Apr 1951); B (Apr 1951 – 1956); 230 (1956 – Feb 1957); D (carried on Pumas whilst at Odiham)

Number 230 Squadron Royal Air Force was a Royal Air Force (RAF) flying squadron, currently based at Medicina Lines in Brunei Darussalam, part of British Forces Brunei. The squadron was previously part of Royal Air Force Germany (RAFG), operating the Puma HC1 there from 1980. Following the drawdown of the British Armed Forces in Germany at the end of the Cold War, the squadron disbanded on 30 April 1992. This was short-lived however, and the squadron reformed at RAF Aldergrove on 4 May 1992, again with the Puma HC1.

The squadron is well experienced in night flying; almost a third of flights are undertaken after dark. The 2004 Future Capabilities chapter of the UK Defence White Paper, Delivering Security in a Changing World, announced a plan to reduce the squadrons Puma force by six helicopters. It was announced in late 2008 that the squadron was to move to RAF Benson by 2010. The squadron operated the Puma HC Mk2 from 2013 until the aircraft's retirement in 2025.

== History ==
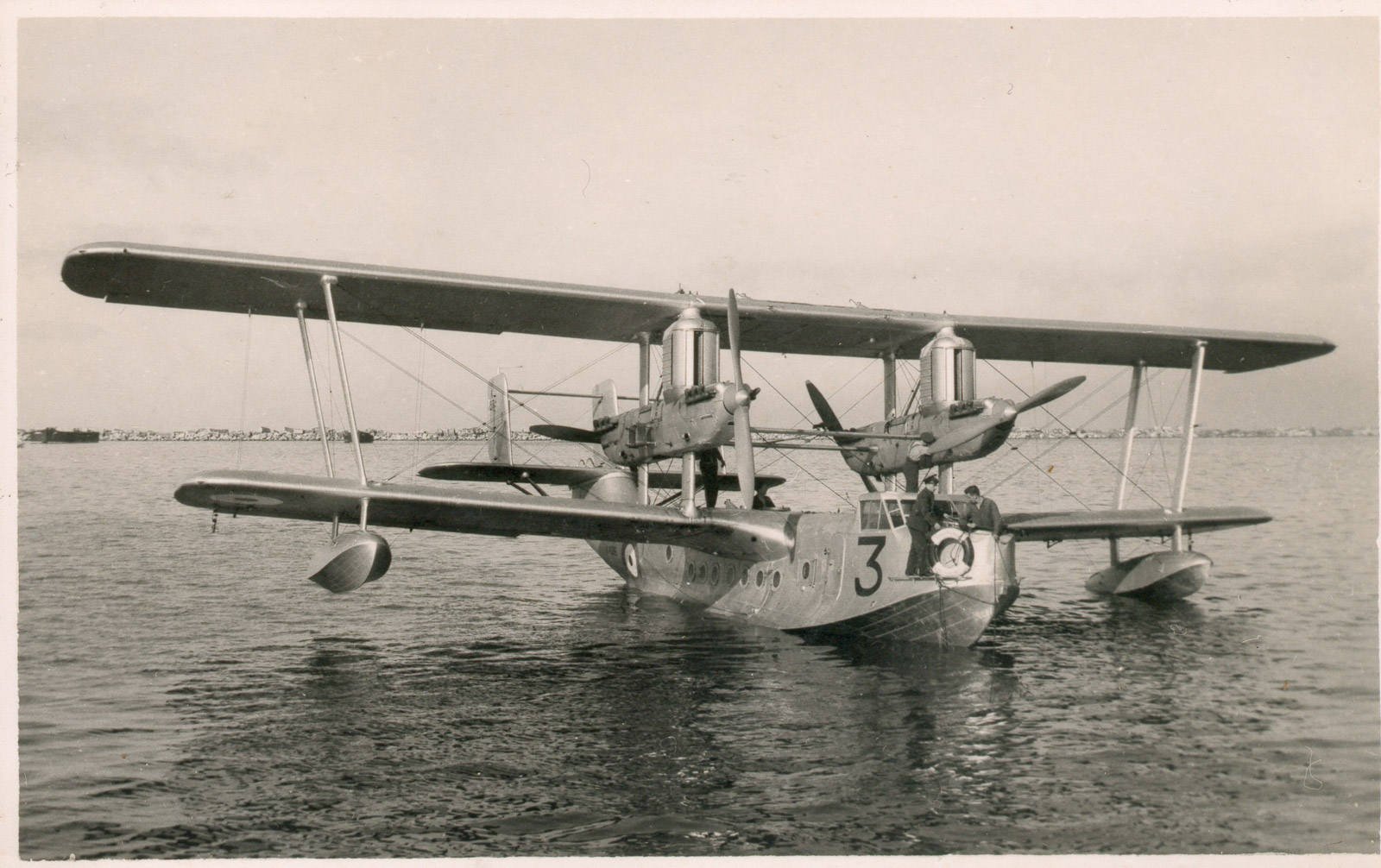
Short Singapore III flying boat of 230 squadron at Alexandria, mid-1930s.

=== First formation ===
No. 230 Squadron was formed on 20 August 1918; 108 years ago, at Felixstowe, consisting of three flights. Nos. 327 and 328 Flight used Felixstowe F.2 and F.2A flying boats and Fairey IIIs for maritime reconnaissance, whilst No. 487 Flight flew Sopwith Camels on escort duties. At the end of World War I, the squadron was retained as one of the few RAF coastal units. In 1920, the squadron got Felixstowe F.5 flying boats, and it moved to RAF Calshot in May 1922, where on 1 April 1923, it was renumbered to 480 Flight RAF.

=== First reformation ===
On 1 December 1934, No. 230 Squadron was reformed at RAF Pembroke Dock with Short Singapore flying boats. The Squadron used the Singapore until 1938, serving from Aboukir, Alexandria, Lake Timsah, and after a short return to the UK, RAF Seletar. In 1938, the squadron began converting to the Short Sunderland flying boat, the aircraft it would be equipped with for the next 20 years until its disbandment on 28 February 1957. It received its first Short Sunderland on 22 June 1938.

==== World War II ====
With the start of World War II, the squadron was based in Singapore before relocating to Ceylon in 1940. In May 1940, it was deployed to the Mediterranean, where it was initially based in Egypt before moving to Malta in June. It flew reconnaissance missions for the Mediterranean Fleet and anti-submarine patrols. A reconnaissance sortie by the squadron contributed to the British victory at the Battle of Cape Matapan when one of its Sunderlands spotted the Italian fleet. The squadron subsequently participated in the evacuation of Allied forces during the German invasion of Greece.

Immediately following the Axis invasion of Yugoslavia in April 1941, a squadron of eight Dornier Do 22 and two Rogožarski SIM-XIV-H floatplanes escaped the Bay of Kotor and made their way to Egypt via Crete. These floatplanes and their crews were subsequently assigned to and placed under the operational command of No. 230 Squadron in Aboukir as the No. 2 Yugoslav (floatplane) Squadron, until it was disbanded on 23 April 1942. During its time as part of No. 230 Squadron, the Yugoslav detachment flew 737 anti-submarine combat missions at the cost of three seaplanes and two pilots. The remaining Yugoslav pilots and crew were absorbed into various allied aviation units in 1943. Over the course of 1941, the number of Yugoslav personnel within No. 230 Squadron grew, and by December 1941 there were 115 men, of whom 58 were officers.

In January 1943, the squadron returned to the Indian Ocean, with its main base at Dar-es Salaam, Tanganyika, and additional units stationed in Madagascar. In June, the squadron was split, with some elements returning to the Mediterranean for air-sea rescue and transport duties. Their most notable achievement was the rescue of 42 aircrews from 7 B-17 Flying Fortress bombers that crashed into the sea off Bone following the Schweinfurt–Regensburg mission. In February 1944, the squadron moved to Ceylon. It subsequently participated in the Burma campaign. Two aircraft were sent to Dibrugarh to provide support for the Chindits. In June they evacuated hundreds of casualties from Indawgyi Lake to the Brahmaputra River. One of the aircraft sank in the Brahmaputra and had to be left behind. In February 1945, a detachment was deployed to Calcutta to transport supplies to Burma and evacuate casualties on the way back. In April 1945, the entire squadron was deployed to Burma, from where it conducted attacks on Japanese shipping between Burma and Malaya.

In December 1945, the squadron returned to Singapore before being sent back to the UK in April 1946.

=== Second reformation ===
On 1 September 1958, No. 215 Squadron RAF at Dishforth was renumbered 230 Squadron, flying Scottish Aviation Pioneer light transport aircraft in support of the British Army. In November that year, the squadron moved to RAF Nicosia in Cyprus as a response to the Cyprus Emergency, flying reconnaissance operations against EOKA Greek Cypriot nationalist guerrillas, as well as its normal communications duties. The squadron returned to Britain in April 1959, with its new base being RAF Upavon in Wiltshire. In 1960, the squadron supplemented its Pioneers with larger Scottish Aviation Twin Pioneer aircraft, and in May that year the squadron moved to RAF Odiham. In September 1960, the squadron's 'A' Flight was detached to British Cameroon, flying internal security patrols as the colony prepared for the 1961 British Cameroons referendum. The flight returned to its parent formation in September 1961. Westland Whirlwind HAR.10 helicopters began to arrive in June 1962, becoming the squadron's standard equipment by the end of the year.

In January 1963, No. 230 Squadron moved to RAF Gütersloh in occupied West Germany, with a detachment at Nicosia. The squadron returned to Odiham in December 1964, before being transferred to Borneo, due to the Indonesia–Malaysia confrontation in February 1965. In October 1966, the squadron again returned to Odiham, resuming its detachment at Nicosia. In November 1971, began to convert to the Westland Puma HC1 at RAF Odiham. On 14 October 1980, the squadron moved back to RAF Gütersloh, West Germany, where they remained until being disbanded and reformed at RAF Aldergrove, Northern Ireland in April 1992.

230 Squadron was one of two Northern Ireland based squadrons of the Royal Air Force, the other being 72 Squadron (equipped with Westland Wessex HC2s). 230 Squadron's eighteen Puma aircraft were rotated with No. 33 Squadron's fifteen Pumas to even out flight hours amongst the fleet (Northern Ireland based helicopters had a much higher operational tempo). The main role of the squadron was tactical transport of the Security Forces, including the Royal Ulster Constabulary (RUC), Police Service of Northern Ireland (PSNI), and the British Army.

On 17 November 2009, 230 Squadron eventually left Northern Ireland for RAF Benson in Oxfordshire (together with 33 Squadron from RAF Odiham) after 17 years in the province.

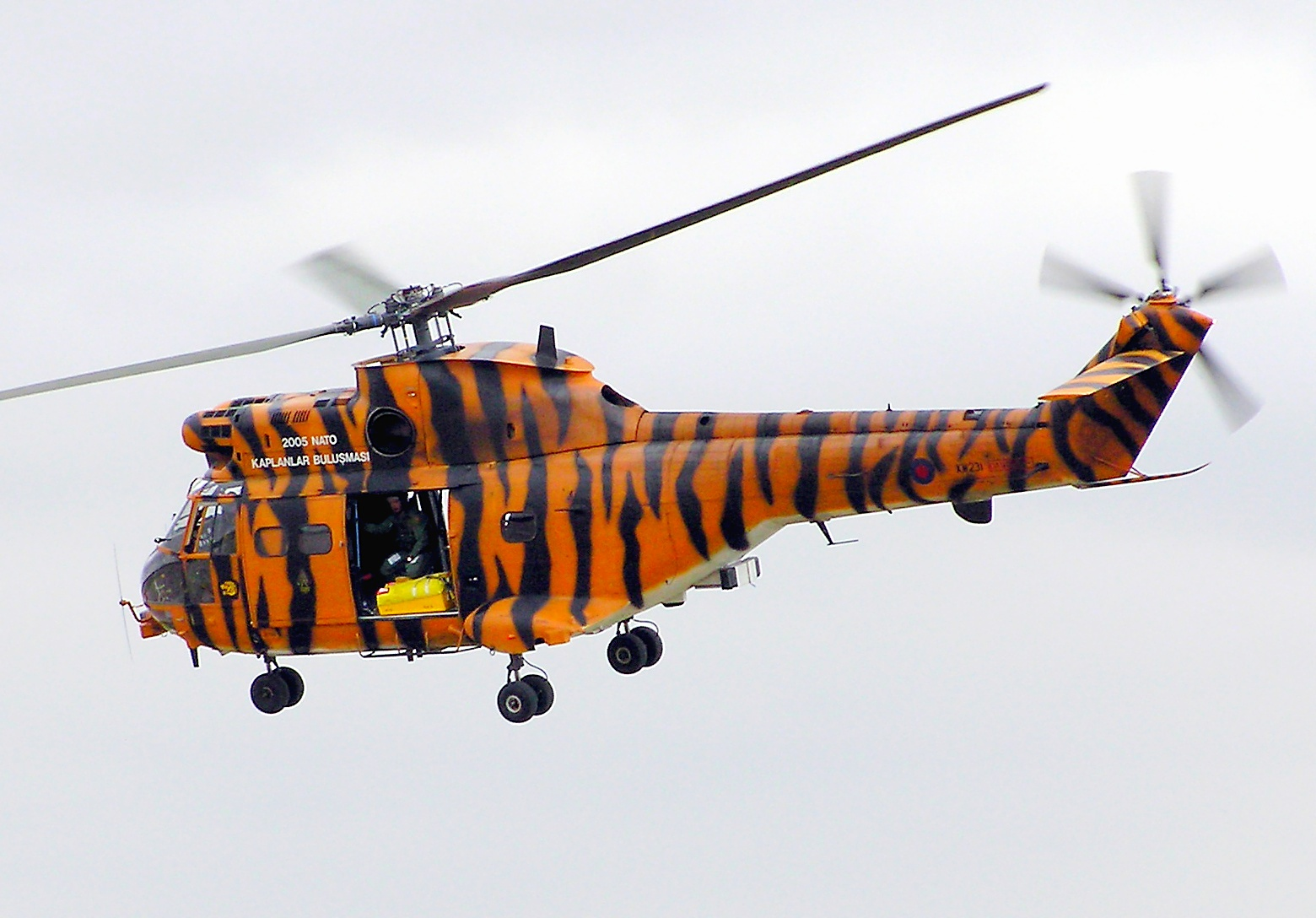
A Westland Puma HC1 of 230 Squadron.

=== Kabul accident ===
On 11 October 2015, one member of the squadron was killed in an accident in Kabul, Afghanistan, whilst landing at the NATO Training and Support Mission HQ. A Ministry of Defence spokesman said the crash was "an accident and not the result of insurgent activity". The crewman was named a day later, and was repatriated back to the UK on the 20th. The Flight Lieutenant's CO commented saying "A man with exceptionally high standards, he was never afraid to remind anyone when he felt they could have done better. However, this advice was always delivered with his characteristic wry smile and good humour. The Support Helicopter Force has lost not only an outstanding operator but a good friend to so many... his lasting legacy will be the professionalism and courage he passed onto all who flew with him. A loving husband and father, our thoughts are with his wife and children at this most difficult of times." A post mortem found he died of severe head injuries. The inquest was adjourned indefinitely until the conclusion of separate inquiries being undertaken by the Ministry of Defence were completed.

The squadron was awarded a new squadron standard in February 2019 by RAF Benson's Honorary Air Marshal, Prince Michael of Kent. The standard, the third to be awarded to the squadron, is made of silk, and features the battle honours awarded to the unit since its formation.

=== Brunei ===
On 18 May 2023, No. 230 Squadron returned to the island of Borneo, relocating from RAF Benson to Medicina Lines in Brunei Darussalam, as part of British Forces Brunei.

The squadron's Puma HC.2s were retired from service in March 2025. They are to be replaced by new Jupiter HC2 helicopters in 2026 though in the interim the Chinook helicopter took over the role.

== Aircraft operated ==
Aircraft operated by No. 230 Squadron Royal Air Force
from	to	aircraft	version	notes
August 1918	March 1919	Curtiss H.12	H.16	
September 1918	December 1918	Sopwith Camel		No. 487 Flight
October 1918	June 1921	Fairey III	B, C	Nos. 327 and 328 Flight
August 1918	April 1923	Felixstowe F.2	A, F.3	Nos. 327 and 328 Flight
January 1920	April 1923	Felixstowe F.5		
April 1935	November 1938	Short Singapore	Mk.III	
June 1938	January 1943	Short Sunderland	Mk.I	
June 1941	March 1942	Dornier Do 22	K	ex-Royal Yugoslav Navy no. 2 squadron
June 1941	March 1942	Rogožarski SIM-XIV	H	ex-Royal Yugoslav Navy no. 2 squadron
December 1941	January 1943	Short Sunderland	Mk.II	
April 1942	March 1945	Short Sunderland	Mk.III	
January 1945	February 1957	Short Sunderland	Mk.V	
September 1958	March 1960	Scottish Aviation Pioneer	CC.1	
January 1960	December 1962	Scottish Aviation Twin Pioneer	CC.1/CC.2	
June 1962	December 1971	Westland Whirlwind	HAR.10	
October 1971	December 2012	Westland Puma	HC.1	
March 2013	March 2025	Westland Puma	HC.2	

== Squadron bases ==
Bases and airfields used by No. 230 Squadron Royal Air Force
from	to	base	remark
20 August 1918	7 May 1922	RAF Felixstowe, Suffolk	
7 May 1922	1 April 1923	RAF Calshot, Hampshire	
1 December 1934	2 October 1935	RAF Pembroke Dock, Pembrokeshire, Wales	air echelon left 23 September 1935
23 September 1935	2 October 1935	en route to Egypt	
2 October 1935	24 October 1935	RAF Aboukir, Egypt	
24 October 1935	25 November 1935	RAF Alexandria/Maryut, Egypt	
25 November 1935	1 December 1935	Lake Timsah, Egypt	
1 December 1935	7 August 1936	Alexandria/Maryut, Egypt	air echelon left 30 July 1936
30 July 1936	3 August 1936	en route to UK	
3 August 1936	14 October 1936	RAF Pembroke Dock, Pembrokeshire, Wales	
14 October 1936	8 January 1937	en route to Far East	
8 January 1937	13 February 1940	RAF Seletar, Malaya	
15 October 1939	27 October 1939	Penang / Gelugor, Malaya	detachment
27 October 1939	30 October 1939	Trincomalee, Ceylon	detachment
30 October 1939	23 November 1939	RAF Colombo, Ceylon	detachment
23 November 1939	13 February 1940	RAF Koggala, Ceylon	detachment
13 February 1940	2 May 1940	RAF Koggala, Ceylon	
2 May 1940	6 May 1940	en route to Egypt	
6 May 1940	19 June 1941	Alexandria/Maryut, Egypt	
12 December 1940	18 April 1941	Skaramagas, Greece	detachment
19 June 1941	3 July 1942	RAF Aboukir, Egypt	
3 July 1942	28 July 1942	Kasfareet / Fanara (Great Bitter Lake), Egypt	
28 July 1942	9 January 1943	RAF Aboukir, Egypt	
9 January 1943	7 February 1944	Dar es Salaam, Tanganyika Territory	
1 June 1943	7 November 1943	RAF Aboukir, Egypt	detachment
7 February 1944	17 April 1945	RAF Koggala, Ceylon	
17 April 1945	23 May 1945	RAF Akyab, Burma	
23 May 1945	1 August 1945	RAF Rangoon, Burma	
1 August 1945	1 December 1945	Red Hills Lake, Madras, British India	
1 December 1945	15 April 1946	RAF Seletar, Singapore	
15 April 1946	10 August 1946	RAF Pembroke Dock, Pembrokeshire, Wales	
10 August 1946	16 September 1946	RAF Castle Archdale (Lower Lough Erne), County Fermanagh, Northern Ireland	
16 September 1946	16 February 1949	RAF Calshot, Hampshire	
4 July 1948	18 December 1948	Finkenwerder, Hamburg, West-Germany	detachment Berlin airlift
16 February 1949	28 February 1957	RAF Pembroke Dock, Pembrokeshire, Wales	
1 September 1958	27 November 1958	RAF Dishforth, North Yorkshire	
27 November 1958	7 April 1959	RAF Nicosia, Cyprus	
7 April 1959	1 May 1959	RAF Dishforth, North Yorkshire	
1 May 1959	30 May 1960	RAF Upavon, Wiltshire	
30 May 1960	14 January 1963	RAF Odiham, Hampshire	
September 1960	September 1961	Mamfe, British Cameroons	detachment
14 January 1963	1 January 1965	RAF Gütersloh, West-Germany	detachment at Nicosia, Cyprus
1 January 1965	10 March 1965	RAF Odiham, Hampshire	
10 March 1965	14 November 1966	Labuan, Malaysia	
14 November 1966	25 November 1966	en route to UK	
25 November 1966	10 March 1969	RAF Odiham, Hampshire	detachment at Nicosia, Cyprus
10 March 1969	3 December 1971	RAF Wittering, Cambridgeshire	detachment at Nicosia, Cyprus
1 October 1971	1 January 1972	RAF Odiham	training as No. 230 Sqn (Puma Echelon)
1 January 1972	14 October 1980	RAF Odiham, Hampshire	
14 October 1980	30 April 1992	RAF Gütersloh, West-Germany	dets. at Belize and Northern Ireland
November 1990	April 1991	Ras-Al-Ghar, Saudi Arabia	detachment for Operation Granby
4 May 1992	17 November 2009	RAF Aldergrove, County Antrim	
August 1995	October 1995	Bosnia	detachment
17 November 2009	18 May 2023	RAF Benson, Oxfordshire	
18 May 2023	present	Medicina Lines, Brunei Darussalam	

== See also ==
- List of RAF squadrons
