= Felixstowe F.2 =

1917 British flying boat class

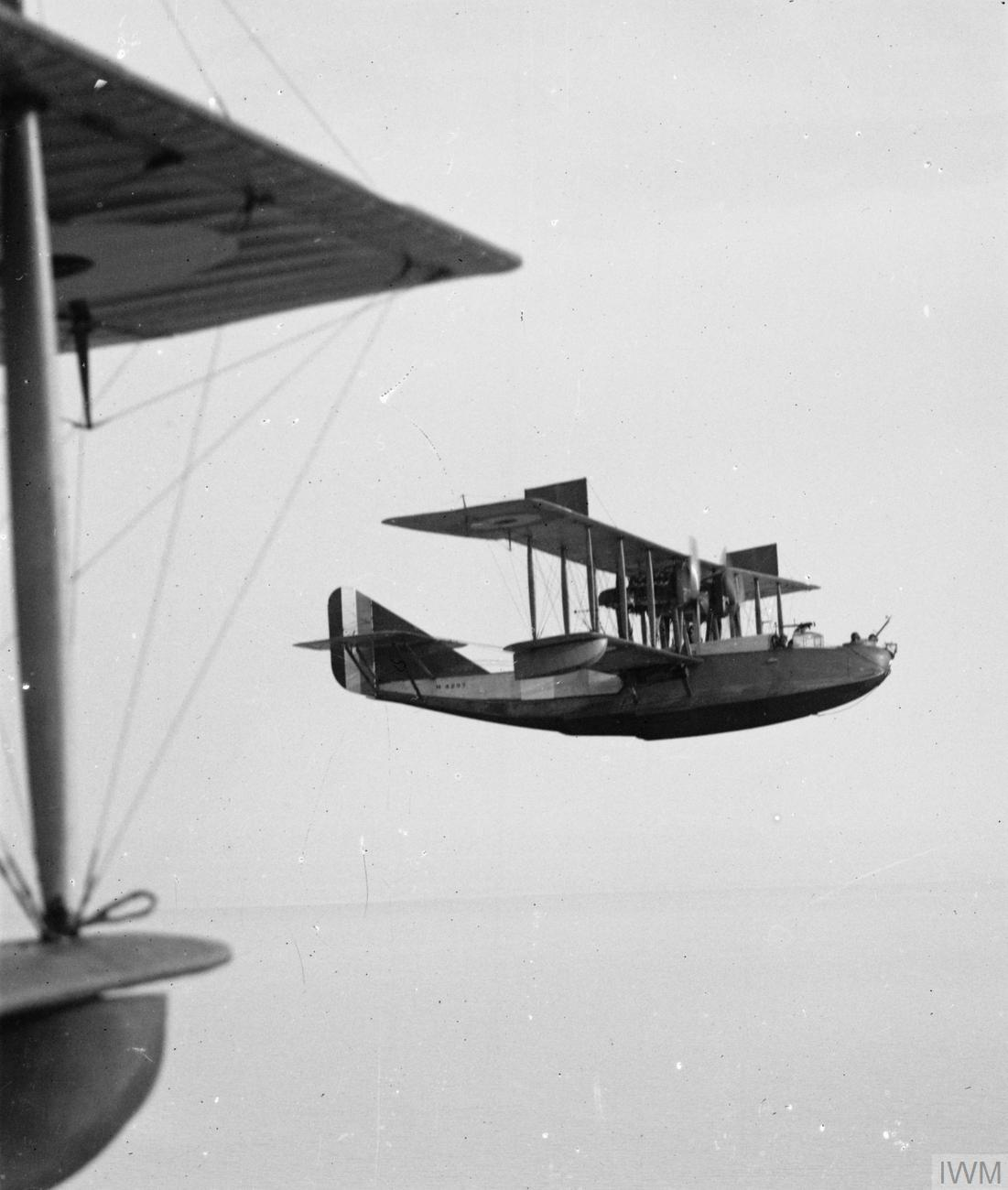
- Felixstowe F.2A in flight.

General information
- Type: Military flying boat
- National origin: United Kingdom
- Manufacturer: S.E.Saunders Ltd; Aircraft Manufacturing Co Ltd; May, Harden & May
- Designer: John Cyril Porte
- Primary users: Royal Naval Air Service Royal Air Force; United States Navy
- Number built: 175

History
- Introduction date: 1917
- First flight: July 1916
- Developed from: Felixstowe F.1; Curtiss H-12
- Variants: Felixstowe F.3; Felixstowe F.5; Felixstowe F5L

The Felixstowe F.2 was a 1917 British flying boat class designed and developed by Lieutenant Commander John Cyril Porte RN at the naval air station, Felixstowe during the First World War adapting a larger version of his superior Felixstowe F.1 hull design married with the larger Curtiss H-12 flying boat. The Felixstowe hull had superior water contacting attributes and became a key base technology in most seaplane designs thereafter.

== Design and development ==
Before the war Porte had worked with American aircraft designer Glenn Curtiss on a flying boat, America in which they intended to cross the Atlantic in order to win the £10,000 prize offered by the British Daily Mail newspaper for the first aircraft to cross the Atlantic. Following the outbreak of war in Europe, Porte returned to England and rejoined the Royal Navy, eventually becoming commander of the naval air station at Felixstowe where he recommended the purchase from Curtiss of an improved version of the America flying boat on which he had worked, the Curtiss H-4 type, resulting in the RNAS receiving two prototype Americas and 62 H-4s.

The Curtiss H-4 was found to have a number of problems, being both underpowered and having a hull too weak for sustained operations and having poor handling characteristics when afloat or taking off. One flying boat pilot, Major Theodore Douglas Hallam, wrote that they were "comic machines, weighing well under two tons; with two comic engines giving, when they functioned, 180 horsepower; and comic control, being nose heavy with engines on and tail heavy in a glide."

To try to resolve the H-4's hydrodynamic issues, in 1915 Porte carried out a series of experiments on four H-4s fitted with a variety of modified hulls, using the results of these tests to design a new 36-foot-long (11 m) hull which was fitted to the wings and tail of an H-4, serial number 3580, with a pair of 150 hp (112 kW) Hispano-Suiza 8 engines as the Felixstowe F.1. Rather than the lightweight boat-type structure of the Curtiss boats, the F.1's hull was based around a sturdy wooden box-girder similar to that used in contemporary landplanes, to which were attached a single-step planing bottom and side sponsons. Once modified by the fitting of a further two steps, the new hull proved to give much better take off and landing characteristics and was much more seaworthy.

Porte then designed a similar hull, for the larger Curtiss H-12 flying boat, which while larger and more capable than the H-4s, shared failings of a weak hull and poor water handling. The combination of the new Porte II hull, this time fitted with two steps, with the wings of the H-12, a new tail and powered by two Rolls-Royce Eagle engines was named the Felixstowe F.2; its first flight was in July 1916, proving greatly superior to the Curtiss on which it was based. The F.2 entered production as the Felixstowe F.2A, being used as a patrol aircraft, with about 100 being completed by the end of World War I. Another seventy were built, and these were followed by two F.2C which were built at Felixstowe.

In February 1917, the first prototype of the Felixstowe F.3 was flown. This was larger and heavier than the F.2, giving it greater range and heavier bomb load, but poorer agility. Approximately 100 Felixstowe F.3s were produced before the end of the war.

The Felixstowe F.5 was intended to combine the good qualities of the F.2 and F.3, with the prototype first flying in May 1918. The prototype showed superior qualities to its predecessors but the production version was modified to make extensive use of components from the F.3, in order to ease production, giving lower performance than either the F.2A or F.3.

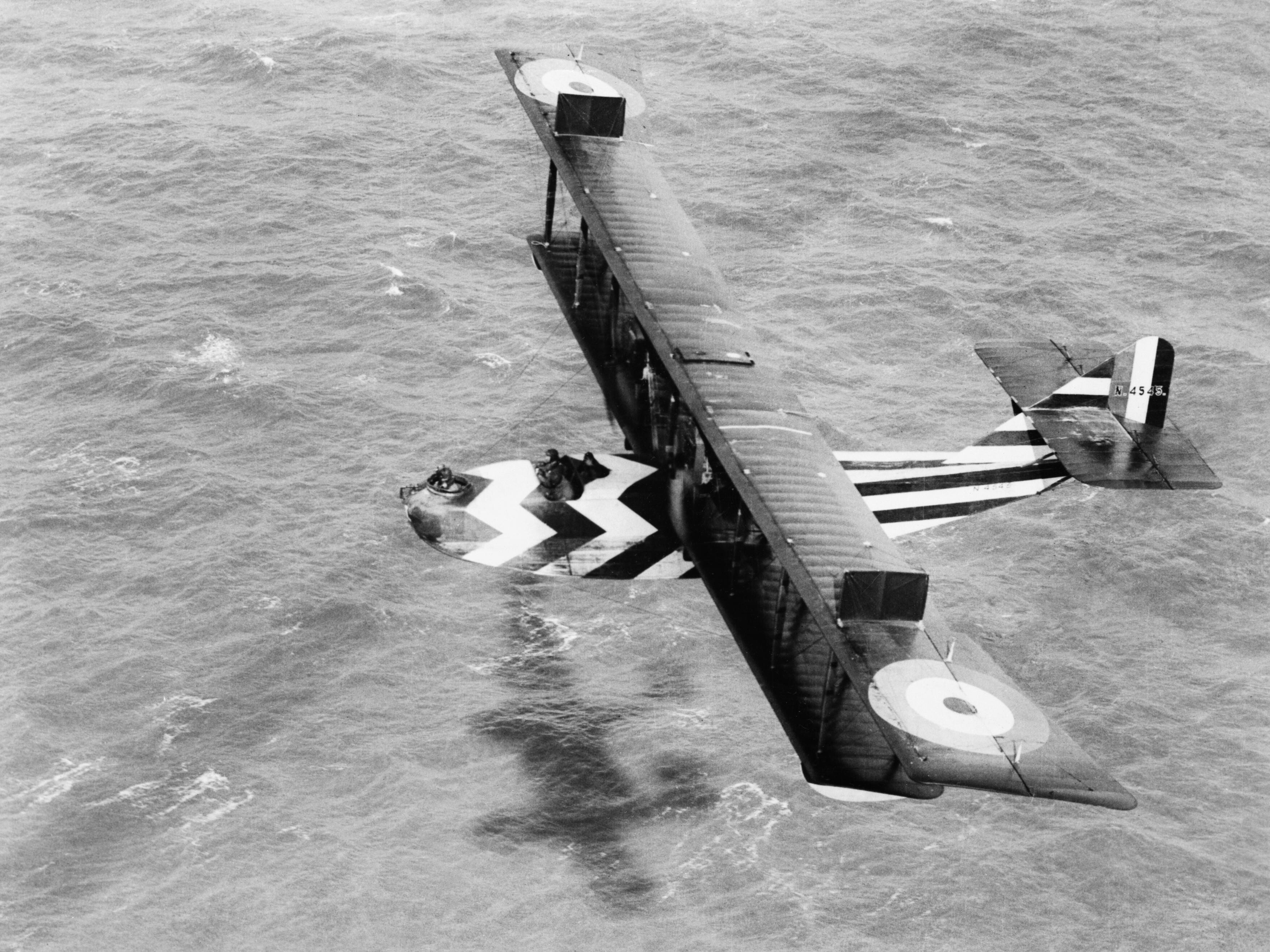
Felixstowe F.2B (N4545) in a dazzle scheme during an anti-submarine patrol. The dazzle camouflage adopted aided identification during air combat and on the water in the event of being forced down.

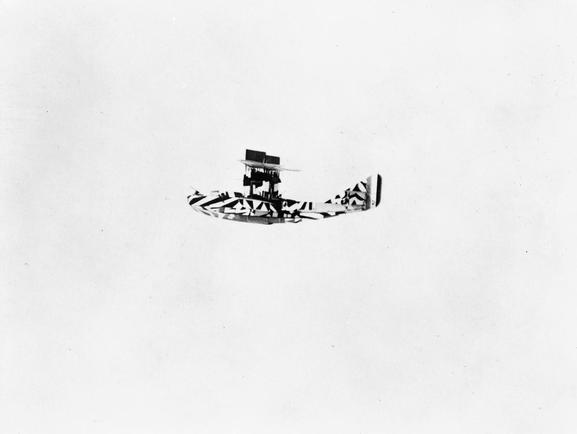
Felixstowe F.2A (N4283), finished in a black and white scheme, piloted by Captains R. Leckie and G. E. Livock, March 1918.

== Operational history ==
The Felixstowe F.2A was used as a patrol aircraft over the North Sea until the end of the war. Its excellent performance and maneuverability made it an effective and popular type, often fighting enemy patrol and fighter aircraft, as well as hunting U-boats and Zeppelins. The larger F.3, which was less popular with its crews than the more maneuverable F.2A, served in the Mediterranean and the North Sea.

The F.5 did not enter service until after the end of World War I, but replaced the earlier Felixstowe boats (together with Curtiss flying boats) to serve as the RAF's standard flying boat until being replaced by the Supermarine Southampton in 1925.

== Variants ==
F.2A
Based on the Curtiss H12 with a new hull. Powered by two 345 hp Rolls-Royce Eagle VIII engines, with 4 to 7 machine guns and 460 lb of bombs.
F.2B
F.2A with an open cockpit.
F.2C
Modified F.2A with a lighter hull. Two built.

== Operators ==
Chile

- Chilean Air Force - received one F.2A in 1920. Still operational in 1924.

Netherlands

- Royal Netherlands Naval Air Service - one in service (N4551), receiving serial L-2

United Kingdom

- Royal Naval Air Service
- Royal Air Force
  - No. 228 Squadron RAF
  - No. 230 Squadron RAF
  - No. 231 Squadron RAF
  - No. 232 Squadron RAF
  - No. 234 Squadron RAF
  - No. 240 Squadron RAF
  - No. 247 Squadron RAF
  - No. 249 Squadron RAF
  - No. 257 Squadron RAF
  - No. 259 Squadron RAF
  - No. 261 Squadron RAF
  - No. 267 Squadron RAF

United States

- United States Navy

== Specifications (F.2A) ==
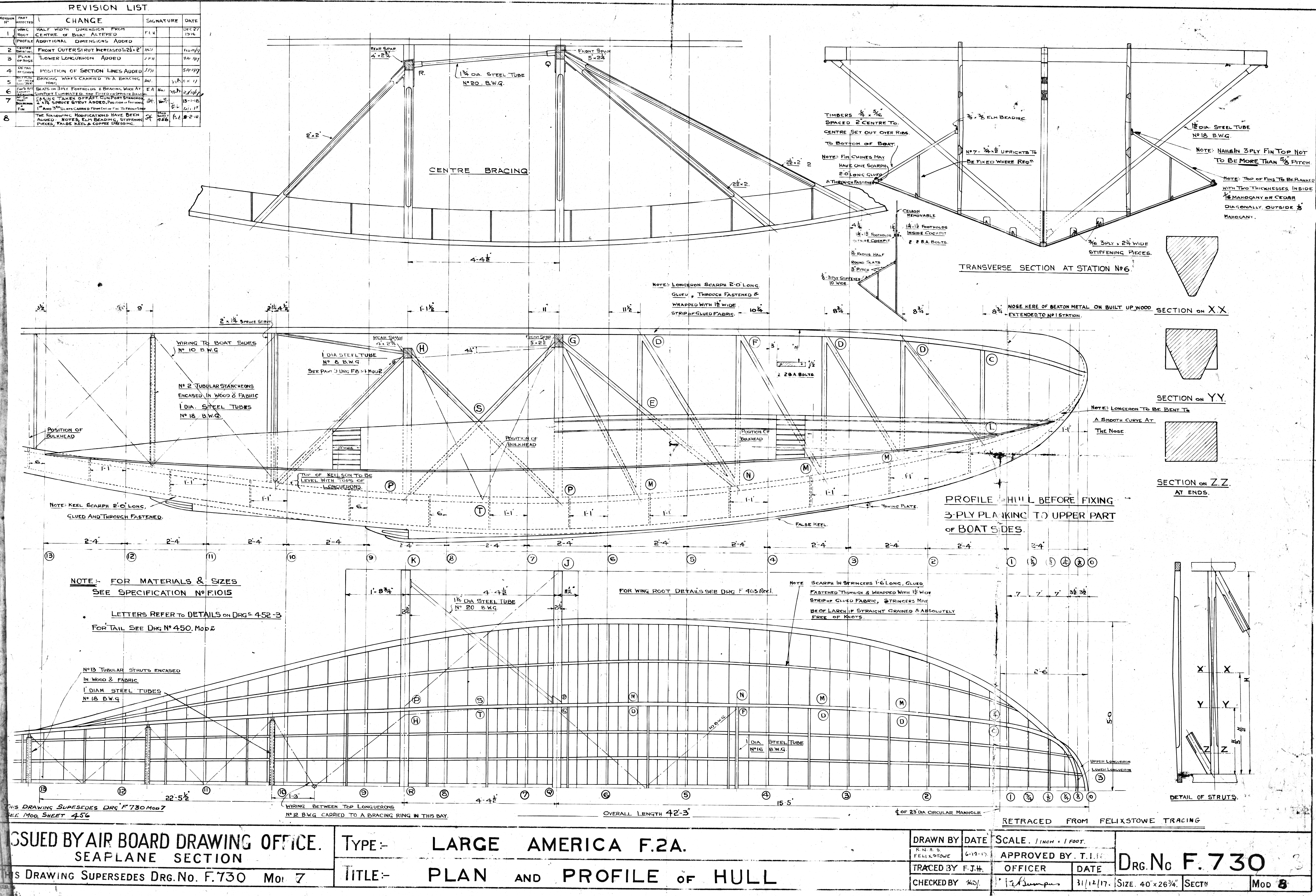
Felixstowe F.2a general arrangement drawing showing details of hull.

Data from British Naval Aircraft since 1912

General characteristics

- Crew: 4
- Length: 46 ft 3 in (14.1 m)
- Wingspan: 95 ft 7.5 in (29.15 m)
- Height: 17 ft 6 in (5.34 m)
- Wing area: 1,133 sq ft (105.3 m^{2})
- Empty weight: 7,549 lb (3,424 kg)
- Gross weight: 10,978 lb (4,980 kg)
- Powerplant: 2 × Rolls-Royce Eagle VIII V12 piston, 345 hp (257 kW) each

Performance

- Maximum speed: 95.5 mph (154 km/h, 83 kn) at 2,000 ft
- Endurance: 6 hours
- Service ceiling: 9,600 ft (2,926 m)
- Time to altitude: 3 min 50 s to 2,000 ft (610 m), 39 min 30 s to 10,000 ft (3,050 m)
- Wing loading: 9.69 lb/sq ft (47.4 kg/m^{2})
- Power/mass: 0.063 hp/lb (0.10 kW/kg)

Armament

- Guns: 4 × .303 in (7.7 mm) Lewis Guns, 1 in nose, 3 amidships
- Bombs: Up to 460 lb (210 kg) of bombs beneath wings

== See also ==
Related development

- Felixstowe F.1
- Curtiss H-12
- Curtiss H-16
- Felixstowe F.3
- Felixstowe F.5
- Felixstowe F5L

== Bibliography ==
- Bruce, J.M. "The Felixstowe Flying-Boats: Historic Military Aircraft No. 11, Part 1." Flight, 2 December 1955, pp. 842–846.
- Bruce, J.M. "The Felixstowe Flying-Boats: Historic Military Aircraft No. 11, Part 2." Flight, 16 December 1955, pp. 895–898.
- Bruce, J.M. "The Felixstowe Flying-Boats: Historic Military Aircraft No. 11, Part 3." Flight, 23 December 1955, pp. 929–932.
- Bruce, J.M. British Aeroplanes 1914-18. London: Putnam, 1957.
- Hallam, T.D. The Spider Web: The Romance of a Flying Boat War Flight. London: William Blackwood, 1919.
- London, Peter. British Flying Boats. Stroud, UK: Sutton Publishing, 2003. ISBN 0-7509-2695-3.
- Rivas, Santiago. British Combat Aircraft in Latin America. Manchester, UK: Crécy Publishing, 2019. ISBN 978-1-90210-957-2.
- Thetford, Owen. British Naval Aircraft since 1912. London: Putnam, Fourth edition 1978. ISBN 0-370-30021-1.
