= No. 261 Squadron RAF =

Former flying squadron of the Royal Air Force

- Active: 20 August 1918 – 13 September 1919; 2 August 1940 – 21 May 1941; 12 July 1941 – 26 September 1945
- Country: United Kingdom
- Branch: Royal Air Force
- Role: Fighter squadron
- Mottos: Latin: Semper Contendo ("I strive continually")

Insignia
- Squadron Badge heraldry: In front of a sword erect, the point downwards, a mullet, the whole in front of a Maltese Cross
- Squadron Codes: FJ (Jun 1944 – Sep 1945)

No. 261 Squadron RAF was a squadron of the Royal Air Force during World War I and World War II. It was involved in the defence of Malta from August 1940 till May 1941 and the campaign in Burma.

== History ==
=== First World War ===
The squadron first formed on 20 August 1918 at Felixstowe from Nos. 339, 340 and 341 flights of the former Royal Naval Air Service (RNAS) and continued to operate their Felixstowe F.3 flying-boats on anti-submarine and anti-shipping patrols. After the armistice it was disbanded on 13 September 1919.

=== Second World War ===
The squadron was reformed on 2 August 1940 to combine the two flights operating in the defence of Malta, the two flights Malta Fighter Flight operating the Gloster Sea Gladiator and 418 Flight operating Hawker Hurricanes. Among the inherited aircraft were the two survivors of the three Gladiators supposedly named Faith, Hope and Charity; Charity had been shot down the week before the squadron formed. The squadron suffered badly from attacks by German and Italian aircraft and when No. 185 Squadron arrived in Malta, the squadron was disbanded and the remnants were absorbed into No. 185 Squadron between 12 and 21 May 1941.

=== Reformed again ===
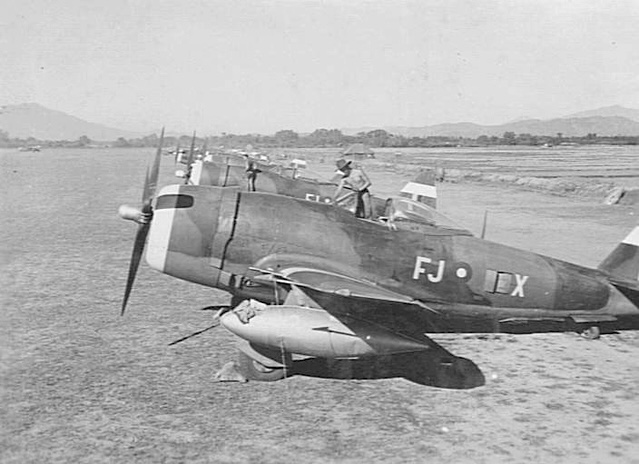
P-47 Thunderbolts of No. 261 Squadron at the Wangjing airstrip in India, December 1944

The squadron was reformed at RAF Habbaniya, Iraq on 12 July 1941 by re-numbering No. 127 Squadron and again was equipped with Gladiators and Hurricanes. The main role was the defence of the oil ports, when fighting in Iraq ended the squadron sent detachments to Palestine and Cyprus. The squadron moved to Haifa, Palestine in January 1942. Re-equipped with the Hurricane IIB the squadron moved to the Far East in early 1942 to join the campaign in Burma. The first action was in February 1943 when the squadron flew ground attack sorties. It undertook escort duties to the Douglas Dakota operating supply missions. The squadron re-equipped with the P-47 Thunderbolt in 1944 and returned to action in September 1944 to join an attack on Rangoon. It fought to the end of the Burma campaign and it had moved to India to re-group ready to join the action in Malaya as the war ended. The squadron was disbanded on 26 September 1945 at RAF Tanjore, India.

== Aircraft operated ==
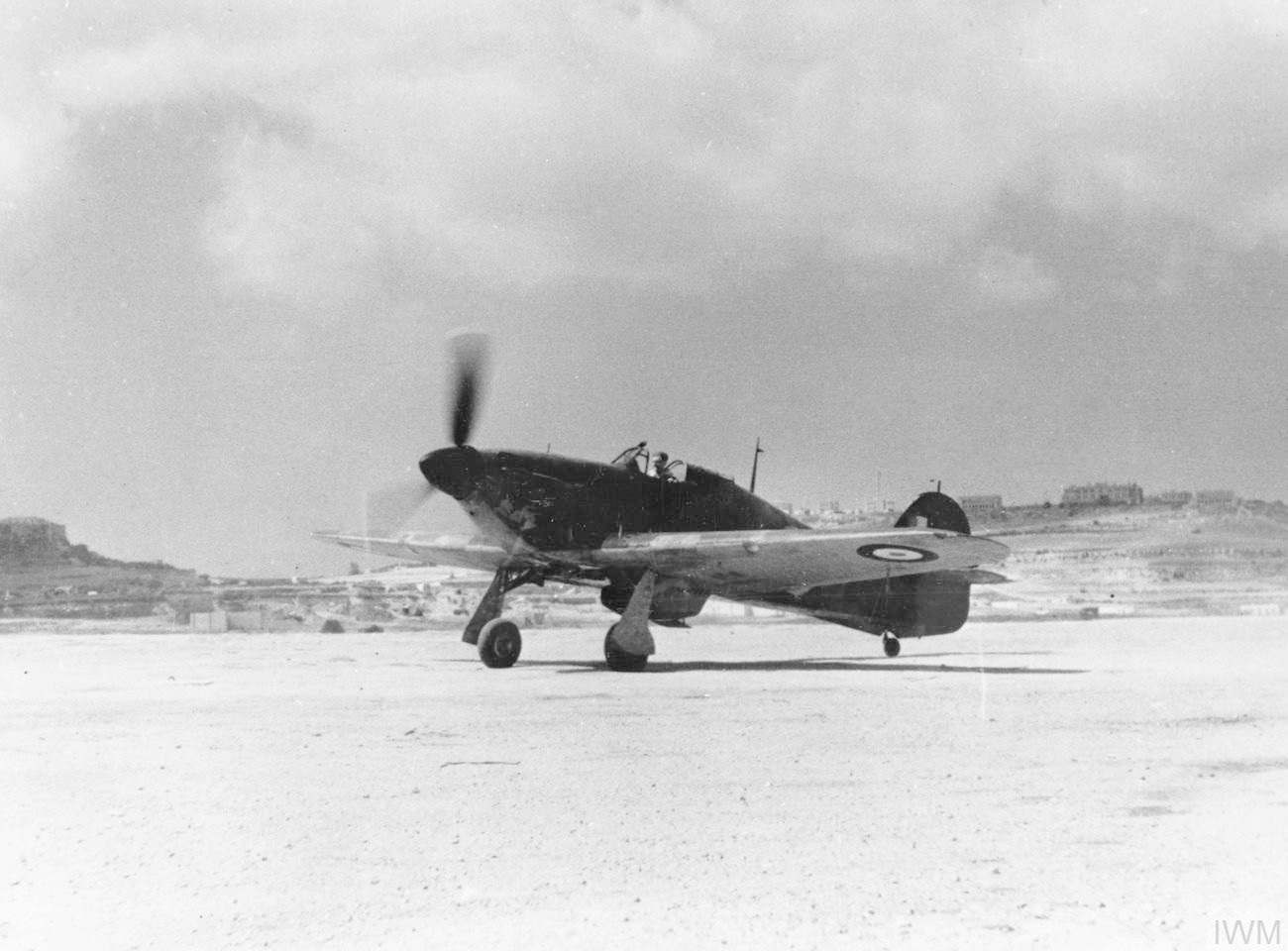
A No. 261 Squadron Hurricane II at RAF Ta Kali, Malta, in September 1941

| From | To | Aircraft | Variant |
|---|---|---|---|
| Aug 1918 | Sep 1919 | Felixstowe F.3 | |
| Aug 1940 | Jan 1941 | Gloster Sea Gladiator | Mk.I |
| Aug 1940 | May 1941 | Hawker Hurricane | Mk.I |
| Jul 1941 | Sep 1941 | Gloster Gladiator | Mk.I |
| Jul 1941 | Apr 1942 | Hawker Hurricane | Mk.I |
| Mar 1942 | Nov 1943 | Hawker Hurricane | Mk.IIb |
| Oct 1943 | Jun 1944 | Hawker Hurricane | Mk.IIc |
| Jun 1944 | Oct 1944 | Republic Thunderbolt | Mk.I (P-47D "Razor back") |
| Aug 1944 | Sep 1945 | Republic Thunderbolt | Mk.II (P-47D "Bubble top") |

== Surviving aircraft ==
The fuselage of Gladiator Faith is on display at the Malta War Museum, Fort St Elmo, Valletta.

== See also ==
- List of Royal Air Force aircraft squadrons
