= No. 267 Squadron RAF =

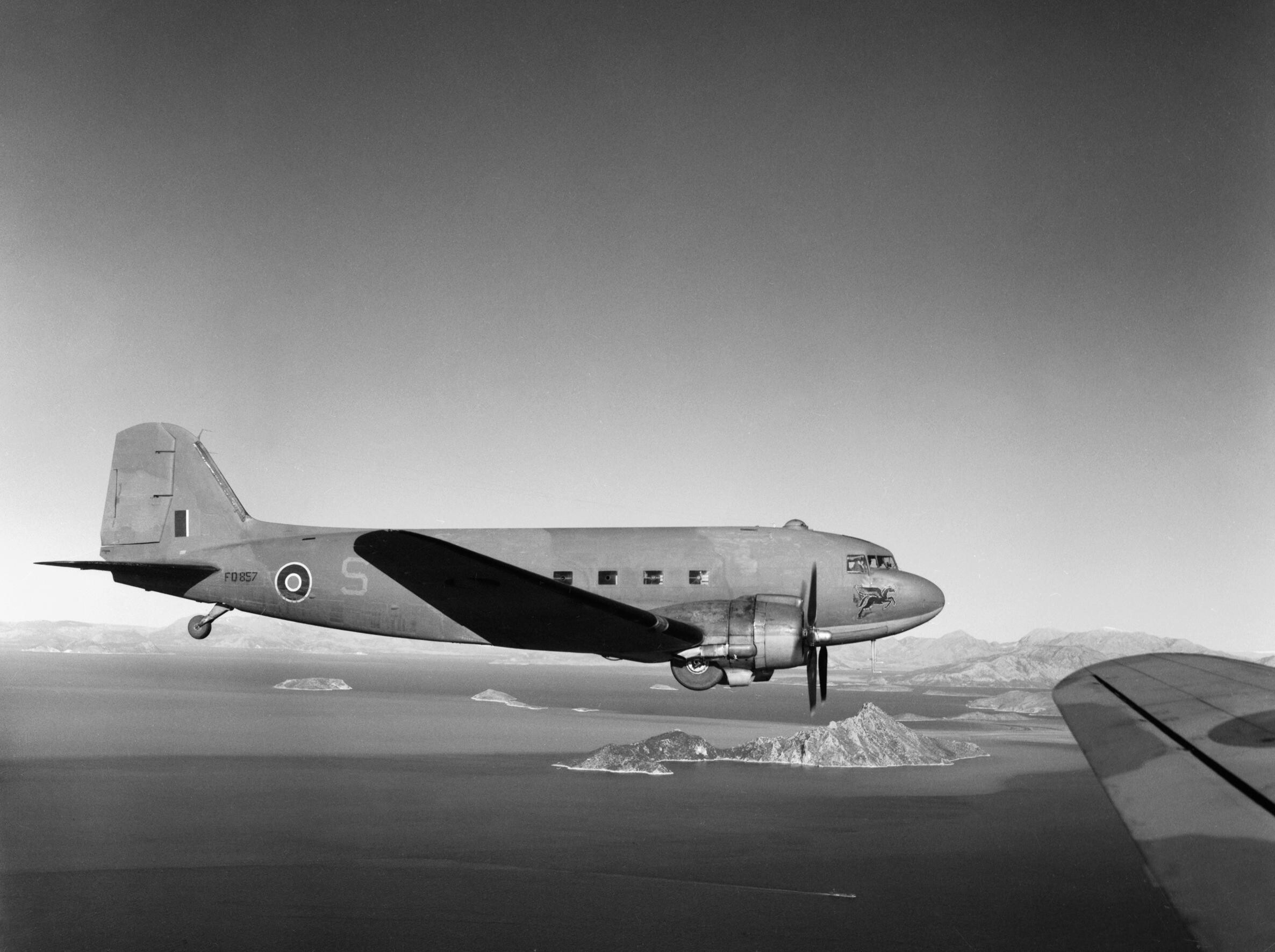
- A 267 Squadron Douglas Dakota C.III in flight, 1944
- Active: 27 September 1918–1 August 1923; 19 August 1940–30 June 1946; 15 February 1954–1 November 1958; 1 November 1962 – 30 June 1970
- Disbanded: 30 June 1970
- Country: United Kingdom
- Branch: Royal Air Force
- Size: Squadron
- Motto: Sine Mora (Without delay)
- Engagements: First World War Second World War: Western Desert campaign; Mediterranean Theatre; Burma campaign

No. 267 Squadron RAF was a unit of the Royal Air Force that served during World War I & World War II. The squadron has been formed a total of four times.

== History ==
The squadron was formed at RAF Kalafrana, Malta on 27 September 1918 from Nos. 360, 361, 362 and 363 Flights equipped with a mixture of Felixstowe F.2a and F.3 flying boats and Short 184 floatplanes. It flew anti-submarine patrols over the Mediterranean Sea until the end of the First World War. Unlike most of the RAF's maritime patrol units, it remained operational after the end of the war, supporting the Mediterranean Fleet. In December 1920, the squadron received Fairey IIID floatplanes, with its Short 184s being retired in 1921. The squadron's IIIDs made deployments aboard the seaplane carrier Ark Royal. On 1 August 1923, the squadron was disbanded, with the Fairey IIID-equipped flight, which was deployed on Ark Royal in the Dardanelles at the time, becoming No. 481 (Coastal Reconnaissance) Flight. The flight remained operational at Kalafrana until January 1929, when it was renumbered 202 Squadron.

On 19 August 1940, the squadron was reformed from Communication Unit, Heliopolis RAF equipped with a variety of light aircraft, including Miles Magisters, Percival Proctors, Percival Q6s and Avro Ansons, with major duties including carrying mail to units in the Western Desert and VIP transport. In 1941, the squadron acquired Westland Lysanders to carry out its mail runs, with a flight of Gloster Gladiator fighters used for metrological flights. On 30 March 1941, one of the squadron's Q6s, carrying Air Marshal Tedder on a tour of Cyrenaica, force landed north west of Mechili. The aircraft was not spotted until the next day, when Tedder was rescued by a Blenheim bomber that evening, avoiding capture by the advancing German forces. On 11 April 1941, one of the squadron's Lockheed Lodestars evacuated Prince Paul of Yugoslavia and Princess Olga of Greece and Denmark from Greece to Egypt, with the squadron flying several more evacuation flights over the next few days. On 8 April 1941, one of the squadron's Lodestars was carrying General Wavell from Tobruk to Egypt when a loss of oil pressure caused the aircraft to force land. While the aircraft was wrecked, all aboard, including Wavell, were unharmed, and were rescued by an armoured car which took them to Sollum, from where Wavell was flown back to his headquarters at Cairo. From August 1941, the squadron's Lysanders added anti-malarial spraying to their duties, while transport operations continued.

By June 1942, the squadron rationalised its equipment to Lodestars and Lockheed Hudsons, and began operating a regular service to Malta. In August 1942, operations extended to transport throughout the Mediterranean area and also undertook supply-dropping missions to resistance fighters in Italy and the Balkans, including Operation Wildhorn, the operation to bring back parts of a recovered V-2 rocket from Poland. The squadron moved to Italy in November 1943 and later to India in February 1945 during the Fourteenth Army's final offensive during the Burma campaign. The squadron disbanded on 30 June 1946, although continued operations until 21 July.

Reformed on 15 February 1954 at RAF Kuala Lumpur, Malaya as a transport support and communications squadron. It was renumbered No. 209 Squadron on 1 November 1958. The squadron was again reformed as a transport squadron on 1 November 1962 at RAF Benson with No. 38 Group until being disbanded on 30 June 1970.

== Aircraft operated ==
Date	Type	Notes
1918-1921	Short 184	
1918-1921	Felixstowe F.3	
1918-1923	Felixstowe F.2A	
1920-1923	Fairey IIID	
1940-1942	Various	Variety of different aircraft for communications duties
1942-1943	Lockheed Hudson IV	
1942-1943	Lockheed Hudson VI	
1943-1946	Douglas Dakota	
1954-1958	Douglas Dakota	
1954-1958	Auster AOP.6	
1954-1958	Scottish Aviation Pioneer CC.1	
1954-1958	Percival Pembroke C.1	
1954-1956	North American Harvard T.2B	
1962-1970	Hawker Siddeley Argosy C.1	
