= Seaplane Experimental Station =

UK military base

- Felixstowe, Suffolk

Site information
- Type: Naval air station Royal Air Force station
- Controlled by: Royal Navy (1913-18); Royal Air Force (1918-19)

Location
- Coordinates: 51.945°N 1.321°E

Site history
- In use: August 1913-June 1919
- Battles/wars: First World War

The Seaplane Experimental Station, formerly RNAS Felixstowe, was a British Royal Air Force aircraft design unit during the early part of the 20th century.

== Creation ==
During June 1912, surveys began for a suitable site for a base for Naval hydro-aeroplanes, with at first Shotley or Mistley on the River Stour. Ultimately Felixstowe was chosen and the formation of the new Naval Air Station, along with another at Great Yarmouth was announced in April 1913, to be developed along the lines of the station already established on the Isle of Grain.

The unit at Felixstowe was commissioned 5 August 1913 on the River Orwell at Landguard under the command of Captain C. E. Risk, RM as Seaplanes, Felixstowe followed by Lieutenant C. E. H. Rathborne, RN in 1914 and Lieutenant-Commander John Cyril Porte, RN 1915.

RNAS Felixstowe was created soon after the outbreak of World War I following the formation of the Royal Naval Air Service 1 July 1914, from the Naval Wing of the Royal Flying Corps (RFC). Three large hangars 300 feet long and 200 feet wide, with slipways were built by Norwich engineers Boulton & Paul and camouflage paint schemes applied; the base would become the largest operational seaplane station in the United Kingdom.

== Operation ==
As the name implies, the unit designed seaplanes and flying boats. These were generally known by the Felixstowe name although, apart from the prototypes, these flying boats were built by aircraft manufacturers such as Short Brothers, Dick, Kerr & Co. and Phoenix Dynamo Manufacturing Company (the latter two forming part of English Electric in 1918–1919).

Upon Porte's recommendation, the station was initially equipped with Curtiss flying boats. He improved their hull designs, before developing the Felixstowe flying boats from those experiments. Many Felixstowe boats were built under licence in the USA. The craft were flown on long-range patrols to spot the German High Seas Fleet and Zeppelins, with many based at RNAS Felixstowe.

A seaplane carrier, HMS Vindex based at Felixstowe, planned to operate against the Zeppelins; the aircraft, two Bristol Scouts, took off from a short improvised runway on the forward deck. The station also serviced aircraft of the carriers Engadine and Campania.

On 24 April 1916 trials were run in conjunction with the Submarine Service at Parkeston Quay to test the carriage and launching of 2 Sopwith Schneider seaplanes carried on the deck of submarine E22. E22 was sunk the following day off Great Yarmouth by German U-boat SM UB-18.

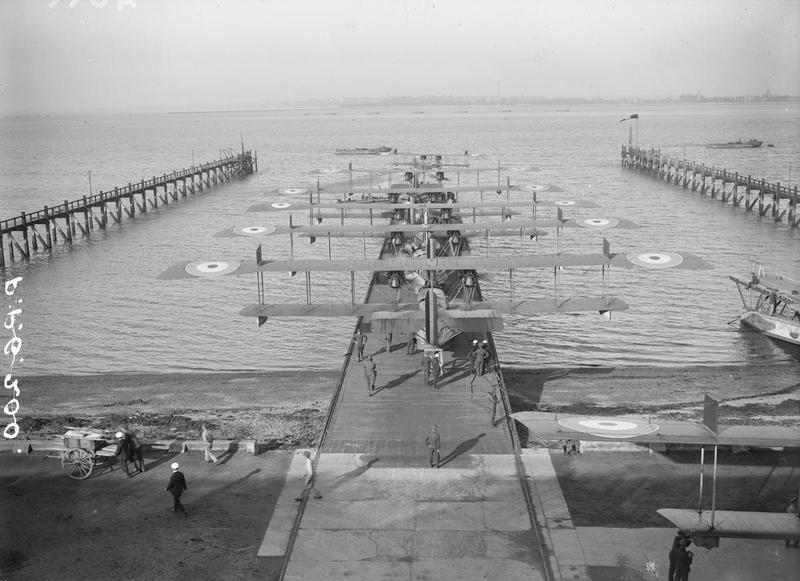
Felixstowe F.2Bs starting out on patrol. Some of the motor boats that towed them can be seen. A converted seaplane lighter with a flight deck moored on the right.

To begin with the flying boats had little success against U-boats until the introduction of the "Spider web" system of patrolling. The patrols capitalised on the practice of U-boats signalling by Wireless their homing position, which could be picked up by wireless stations at Hunstanton, Lowestoft and Birchington. The "Spider Web" used the North Hinder Light Vessel, a Dutch maintained light ship 55 miles from Felixstowe and the Hook of Holland as a centre point. An octagonal figure was drawn with eight arms radiating out from a distance of 30 miles from the centre. A set of circumvential lines then joined the radial arms at 10, 20 and 30 miles making eight sectors, each sector divided into three sections. As the patrolling flying boat flew up and down each sector line, the area was surveyed twice on any patrol and two sectors of the web could be patrolled in under five hours. A flying boat would take off from Felixstowe and head for the North Hinder Light Vessel then fly along a sector line, determined by previous instructions gained from wireless plots, and then along the patrol lines of the sector. "Web" patrols commenced 13 April 1917.

To increase the range of the aircraft, experiments were carried out in the launch and retrieval of flying boats and bi-planes from specially designed lighters towed behind destroyers of the Harwich Force.

On the formation of the Royal Air Force 1 April 1918, the unit was renamed the Seaplane Experimental Station, Felixstowe and disbanded in June 1919.

== Successor ==
The base and its facilities were later used by the Marine Aircraft Experimental Establishment from 1 April 1924 until the Second World War. It was also used as a base by the Schneider Trophy team, the High Speed Flight. RAF Felixstowe closed on 21 June 1962.

== Designs ==
- Felixstowe Porte Baby
- Felixstowe F.1
- Felixstowe F.2
- Felixstowe F.3
- Felixstowe F.4 Fury
- Felixstowe F.5
- Felixstowe F5L

== Station commanders ==
- Captain C. E. Risk, RM 1913–1914
- Lieutenant C. E. H. Rathborne, RN 1914–1915
- Acting Wing Captain R. M. Groves RN 1915
- Commander J. C. Porte, RN 1915–1918
- Wing Commander C. E. Risk, RAF 1918–1919
- Wing Commander I. T. Courtney, RAF 1919–1922
- Flying Officer F. Wilton, RAF 1922–1924
- Wing Commander C. E. H. Rathborne, RAF 1924–1925
- Wing Commander R. B. Maycock, RAF 1925–1928
- Group Captain G. R. Bromet, RAF 1928–1931
- Group Captain A. J. Milley, RAF 1931–1936
- Group Captain E. J. P. Burling, RAF 1936–1939
- Wing Commander D. G. Fleming, RAF 1939–1940
- Wing Commander W. B. Hellard, RAF 1940–1942
- Wing Commander N. Keeble, RAF 1942–1943
- Wing Commander L. G. Martin, RAF 1943–1945
- Group Captain W. G. Abrams, RAF 1945–1946
- Group Captain W. P. Welch, RAF 1946–1948
- Group Captain C. A. Watt, RAF 1948–1949
- Wing Commander D. H. Thomas, RAF 1949–1951
- Wing Commander C. V. Winn, RAF 1951–1953
- Wing Commander J. A. Chorlton, RAF 1953–1954
- Wing Commander W. O. Jones, RAF 1954–1956
- Wing Commander R. P. Burton, RAF 1956–1957
- Wing Commander J. T. O'Sullivan, RAF 1957–1960
- Wing Commander C. F. Price, RAF 1960–1961
- Wing Commander C. H. Baker, RAF 1961–1962

== See also ==
- Royal Naval Air Station Eastchurch
- Port Victoria Marine Experimental Aircraft Depot
- Aeroplane & Armament Experimental Establishment, Martlesham Heath
- No. 4 Group RAF
- RAF Coastal Area
