= Felixstowe F.3 =

British First World War flying boat

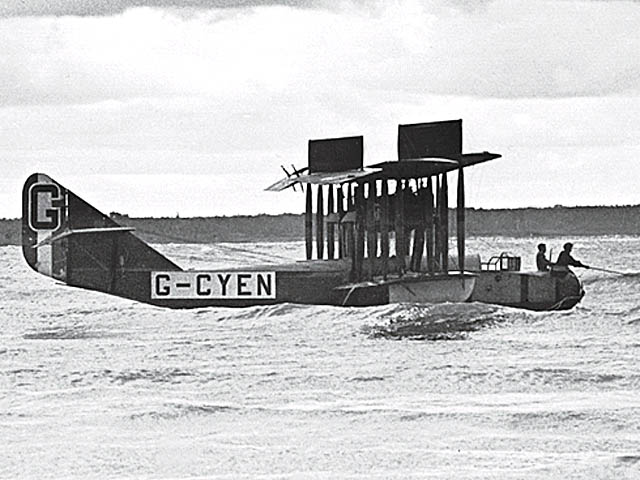
- Felixstowe F.3, Canada 1920

General information
- Type: Military flying boat
- National origin: United Kingdom
- Manufacturer: Short Brothers; Dick, Kerr & Co. Phoenix Dynamo Manufacturing Company; Malta Dockyard (23); Canadian Vickers
- Designer: John Cyril Porte
- Primary users: Royal Naval Air Service Royal Air Force; United States Navy
- Number built: 182

History
- Introduction date: February 1918
- First flight: February 1917
- Developed from: Felixstowe F.2
- Variants: Felixstowe F.5; Felixstowe F5L

The Felixstowe F.3 was a British First World War flying boat, successor to the Felixstowe F.2 designed by Lieutenant Commander John Cyril Porte RN at the naval air station, Felixstowe.

== Design and development ==
In February 1917, the first prototype of the Felixstowe F.3 was flown. This was a larger and heavier development of the Felixstowe F.2A, powered by two 320 hp (239 kW) Sunbeam Cossack engines. Large orders followed, with the production aircraft powered by Rolls-Royce Eagles. The F.3's larger size gave it greater range and a heavier bombload than the F2, but poorer speed and agility. Approximately 100 Felixstowe F.3s were produced before the end of the war, including 18 built by the Dockyard Constructional Unit at Malta.

== Operational history ==
The larger F.3, which was less popular with its crews than the more maneuverable F.2A, served in the Mediterranean as well as the North Sea.

In 1920, the Canadian Air Board sponsored a project to conduct the first-ever Trans-Canada flight to determine the feasibility of such flights for future air mail and passenger service. The leg from Rivière du Loup to Winnipeg was flown by Lieutenant Colonel Leckie and Major Hobbs in a Felixstowe F.3. Six F.3s served with the Canadian Air Force/Air Board between 1921 and 1923.

On the 22 March 1921, a Felixstowe F.3 flying boat of the Portuguese Naval Aviation – crewed by the naval aviators Sacadura Cabral and Ortins de Bettencourt, naval navigator Gago Coutinho and aviation mechanic Roger Soubiran – performed the first flight between Mainland Portugal and Madeira.

== Variants ==
Felixstowe F-III
Canadian Vickers Felixstowe F.3 built for a transatlantic attempt.
Short F.3 Air Yacht
G-EAQT (ex N4019) and G-EBDQ (ex N4177) placed on the civil register and converted for private use. G-EAQT fitted by Short Brothers, including three lounges upholstered in green and grey for ten passengers.

== Operators ==
Short F.3 Air Yacht (G-EAQT), on the Medway, 11 June 1920, before shipment to Australia.

Australia

- The Aerial Company Ltd - G-EAQT (ex N4019) damaged in transit from the UK
- Aviation Ltd - two proposed for commercial use, carrying six passengers or a ton (2,240 lb) of freight between the mainland and Tasmania

Canada

- Canadian Air Board

Portugal

- Portuguese Naval Aviation

Spain

- Aeronáutica Naval España
  - Spanish seaplane carrier Dédalo – three carried

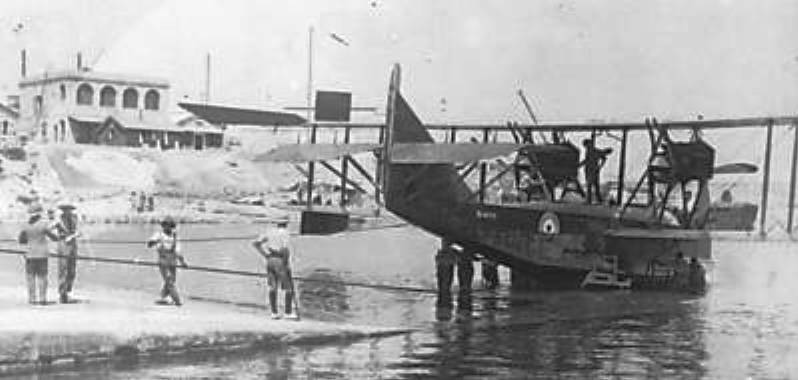
Felixstowe F.3 resting on the slipway at Kalafrana, Malta, c.1918. F.3s were operating throughout the Mediterranean by the end of the war.

United Kingdom

- Royal Naval Air Service
- Royal Air Force
  - No. 232 Squadron RAF
  - No. 234 Squadron RAF
  - No. 238 Squadron RAF
  - No. 249 Squadron RAF
  - No. 261 Squadron RAF
  - No. 263 Squadron RAF
  - No. 265 Squadron RAF
  - No. 267 Squadron RAF
  - No. 269 Squadron RAF
  - No. 270 Squadron RAF
  - No. 271 Squadron RAF

United States

- United States Navy

== Specifications (F.3) ==
RNAS Felixstowe F.3 general arrangement drawing showing interior details.

Data from British Naval Aircraft since 1912

General characteristics

- Crew: four
- Length: 49 ft 2 in (14.99 m)
- Wingspan: 102 ft 0 in (31.09 m)
- Height: 18 ft 8 in (5.69 m)
- Wing area: 1,432 sq ft (133.03 m^{2})
- Empty weight: 7,958 lb (3,610 kg)
- Gross weight: 12,235 lb (5,550 kg)
- Powerplant: 2 × Rolls-Royce Eagle VIII V12 inline piston, 345 hp (257 kW) each

Performance

- Maximum speed: 91 mph (147 km/h, 79 kn) at 2,000 ft (610 m)
- Endurance: Six hours
- Service ceiling: 8,000 ft (2,438 m)
- Time to altitude: 5 min 15 s to 2,000 ft (610 m); 24 min to 6,500 ft (2,000 m)
- Wing loading: 8.54 lb/sq ft (41.8 kg/m^{2})
- Power/mass: 0.056 hp/lb (0.092 kW/kg)

Armament

- Guns: 4 × Lewis guns (one in the nose, three amidships)
- Bombs: Up to 920 lb (420 kg) of bombs beneath wings

== See also ==
Related development

- Felixstowe F.5
- Felixstowe F5L
- Phoenix P.5 Cork
