= Westland Westbury =

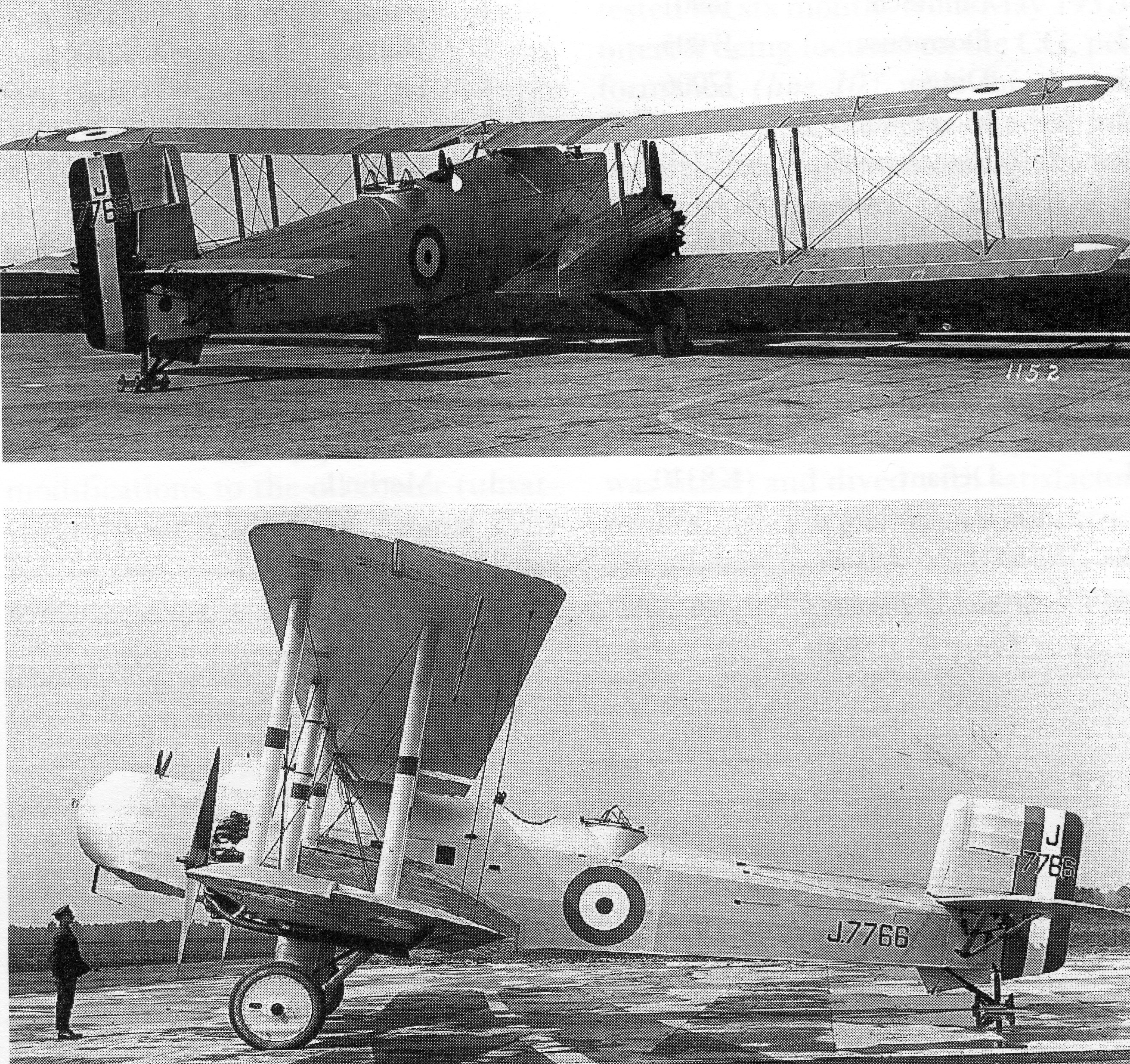

General information
- Type: Fighter aircraft
- National origin: United Kingdom
- Manufacturer: Westland Aircraft
- Primary user: Royal Air Force
- Number built: 2

History
- First flight: 1926

The Westland Westbury was a British twin-engined fighter prototype of 1926. Designed by Westland Aircraft it never entered service but played a useful role in the testing of the COW 37 mm gun. Only the two prototypes were completed.

== Development ==
In 1924 the British Air Ministry issued specification 4/24 for a twin-engined home defence fighter, which would be employed to defend Britain against night attacks by enemy heavy bombers. The aircraft had to have a top speed of at least 125 mph (201 km/h) and a landing speed of not more than 50 mph (80 km/h). In September 1925 the Air Staff amended the specification to specify the use of the 37-mm COW gun and supercharged engines. From the design proposals submitted by the manufacturers, two types were selected for prototypes development, the Bristol Bagshot and the Westland Westbury. Two airframes were ordered from Westland, allotted serial numbers J7765 and J7766.

The Westbury was a twin-engined three-bay biplane of conventional layout, large for its day irrespective of type and remarkably so for a fighter. The first prototype, J7765 was of all-wooden construction, while the second, J7766, had a mixed construction wing with a duralumin mainspar and wooden ribs. All surfaces were covered with fabric. The wings were of equal span, with three pairs of struts on each side and wire bracing. The fuselage was deep, of rectangular cross-section, and had a blunt nose. The crew of three had open cockpits in the nose (front gunner), in front of the wing (pilot) and aft of the wing (rear gunner). The landing gear was fixed. The 450 hp (340 kW) Bristol Jupiter VI air-cooled radial engines were installed without cowls on nacelles that were attached on top of the lower wing, at the innermost pair of struts. Each drove a two-bladed propeller.

The first aircraft J7765 was delivered to the A&AEE at RAF Martlesham Heath in 1926 and 1927. J7766, delivered the following year, was distinguished by having engine nacelles that extended aft of the trailing edge of the wing, the wing with duralumin spars and a metal-covered wing centre section, and a more rounded nose shape. The modified nose and nacelle shapes were also introduced on the first prototype.

Although the Westbury was judged to have good flying characteristics, and the competing Bristol Bagshot monoplane had serious structural problems, it was not put into production. It was clear that the performance of the Westbury was insufficient to make it a useful fighter aircraft. However, it did serve for several years as an armament trials platform, mostly for the 37 mm COW gun.

== Armament and trials ==
The Westbury could be fitted with defensive Lewis guns on a Scarff ring position on top of the fuselage, aft of the COW gun mounting, and in a ventral mount. Its most important gun mountings were in the nose and immediately aft of the wing, and had special fittings for the much larger and heavier COW guns.

The COW gun mounting in the nose was of Westland design, and allowed the gun to be trained over a wide arc. It supported the gun on the apex of a pyramidal structure, that was asymmetric to allow the gunner to have easy access to the weapon. This structure was fixed on a rotating base, which also provided the gunner with a rotating platform to stand on. The gunner could train the mount by turning a hand gear, or push on a pedal to engage a brake that locked the mount in its position. The elevation and depression of the gun were accomplished by the muscle power of the gunner. As the large ammunition clip of the COW gun prevented sighting over the barrel, a sight was installed to its left. The gun is reported to have been successfully fired in the air, also when trained to the side.

The rear COW gun mounting was installed immediately aft of the wing, in a fixed mount that only allowed for a limited adjustment of the angle. A special sight for this gun was installed in the pilot's cockpit. This armament would be aimed by the pilot from a position below the aircraft attacked, in the manner of the Schräge Musik installation used by the Germans during WWII. However, the concept was based on the theory of no allowance sighting, which sought to install the gun at an angle at which the body lift of the projectile, due to the forward motion of the aircraft, would compensate for the effect of gravity, straightening the trajectory. The first firing trials resulted in several broken wing ribs, and a special rubber-spring shield was developed to protect the upper wing.

Over the period of gunnery trials continued between 1927 and 1930, thirteen reports of structural damage were filed, indicating that there remained problems with absorbing the blast and recoil of the guns. The Westbury was also used to test an Oerlikon cannon in the aft position, at angles adjustable between 40 and 60 degrees, but this gun was found to have inadequate serviceability.

== Specifications ==
Data from Brew, Alec. The Turret Fighters - Defiant and Roc. Crowood, UK, 2002.

General characteristics

- Crew: 3
- Length: 43 ft 4.75 in (13.2271 m)
- Wingspan: 68 ft (21 m)
- Height: 13 ft 9 in (4.19 m)
- Wing area: 875 sq ft (81.3 m^{2})
- Empty weight: 4,854 lb (2,202 kg)
- Gross weight: 7,877 lb (3,573 kg)
- Powerplant: 2 × Bristol Jupiter VI 9-cylinder air-cooled radial piston engine, 450 hp (340 kW) each
- Propellers: 2-bladed fixed-pitch propellers

Performance

- Maximum speed: 125 mph (201 km/h, 109 kn)
- Time to altitude: 5,000 ft (1,524 m) in 4 minutes 15 seconds

Armament
Two 37-mm COW guns and one or two 7.7 mm Lewis guns

== See also ==
- Bristol Bagshot
- COW 37 mm gun
