= Gunfight (disambiguation) =

A gunfight is a combat situation between armed parties using guns.

Gunfight or Gun Fight may also refer to:

- Gun Fight, a 1975 video game
- Gun Fight (film), a 1961 film
- Gunfight (song), a 2013 song by Sick Puppies
- "Gunfight", a song by Bush from The Art of Survival, 2022

== See also ==
- Gunfighter (disambiguation)
- Shootout (disambiguation)
- Gunfight at the O.K. Corral, an 1881 shootout in Tombstone, Arizona Territory
