= Gunslinger (disambiguation) =

Gunslinger usually refers to the Old West profession.

Gunslinger may also refer to:

== People ==
- "The Gunslinger", nickname for American football player Brett Favre

== Art, entertainment, and media ==
=== Film ===
- Gunslinger (film), a 1956 Western film
- Gunslingers (1950 film), an American western film
- Gunslingers (2025 film), a Western film

=== Games ===
- Gunslinger (board wargame), a 1982 board wargame of gunfights set in the Old West
- Call of Juarez: Gunslinger, a 2013 videogame set in the American Old West

=== Literature ===
- Gunslinger Girl a Japanese manga series written and illustrated by Yu Aida
- "Gunslinger" (poem), a 1968 poem by Ed Dorn
- The Dark Tower: The Gunslinger, a 1982 Stephen King book
- "The Gunslinger" (novella), a novella by Stephen King

=== Music ===
- "Gunslinger", an Avenged Sevenfold song off the album Avenged Sevenfold
- "Gunslinger", a song by John Fogerty on the 2007 album Revival
- Gunslinger (album), a 2016 album by country music singer Garth Brooks

=== Television ===
- Gunslinger (TV series), a 1961 CBS western television series starring Tony Young
- Gunslingers, a U.S. TV series on the American Heroes Channel
- "Chapter 5: The Gunslinger", the fifth episode of The Mandalorian

== Sports ==
- San Antonio Gunslingers (USFL team), a former United States Football League team (1984–1985)
- San Antonio Gunslingers (indoor football), an arena football team in the National Arena League

== Other uses ==
- AIM-174B Gunslinger, a United States air-to-air missile

== See also ==
- Gunfighter (disambiguation)
- Gunslinger's gait a walking pattern observed in individuals associated with the KGB or the Red Army
- Gunslinger Stratos, a video game

=== Gunslingers ===
- Gunslingers (VFA-105)
- San Antonio Gunslingers (USFL team) professional indoor football team.
- San Antonio Gunslingers (indoor football)
