= Vickers Type 161 =

Type of aircraft

Type 161
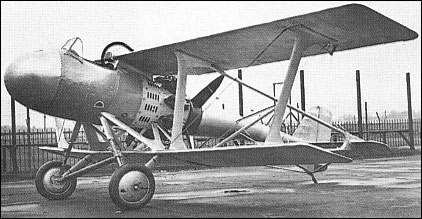

General information
- Type: Interceptor fighter
- National origin: United Kingdom
- Manufacturer: Vickers Ltd.
- Number built: 1

History
- First flight: 21 January 1931

The Vickers Type 161 was an unusual 1930s pusher biplane interceptor, designed to attack aircraft from below with a single upward-angle large calibre gun. The aircraft flew well but the concept was abandoned and only one was built.

== Development ==
The Vickers 161 was designed in response to Air Ministry specification F.29/27. This called for an interceptor fighter operating as a stable gun platform for the COW 37 mm gun produced by the Coventry Ordnance Works (COW) that fired 23 oz (0.65 kg) shells. The gun was to be mounted at 45 degrees or more above the horizontal, so that the aircraft could fly below the target bomber or airship, and fire upwards into it. During World War II the Luftwaffe used a rather similar approach, named Schräge Musik. The specification also called for a top speed well in excess of a typical bomber's cruising speed and a good rate of climb.

Vickers' approach seems to have been influenced by their World War I experience with the Gunbus family. Like them, the Type 161 was a single-engined pusher biplane. The wings were of unequal span and parallel chord, mounted with heavy stagger and a large gap braced in two-bay fashion by streamlined I form, outward leaning interplane struts. Parallel booms, formed on each side by a pair of tubular members, converged from the top and bottom of the inner interplane struts onto the tail. Another pair of tubes joined the bottom of the interplane struts to the upper boom at midpoint. The tailplane had a wide span, extending past the booms; the fin and rudder were conventional and stiffened with lighter bracing to mid-boom. Flying surfaces were fabric covered.

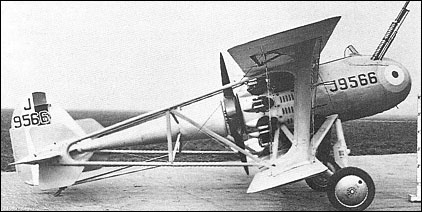

The pilot and gun were housed in a metal monocoque nacelle mounted to the underside of the upper wing, leaving a gap below. The pilot's cockpit was offset to port with the gun to his right, its breech accessible. The Bristol Jupiter VIIF was installed with its cylinders in line with the rear edge of the upper wing, supported by two pairs of struts to the lower wing spars and driving a four-blade propeller. This had an unusual ring fairing that rotated with it and matched the engine cowling in diameter. Aft, and without a break, a fuselage-like fairing ran rearwards, narrowing to the tail. This structure was stabilized on each side by a pair of struts to the upper and lower booms. A split-axle undercarriage had legs to the fuselage and, rearwards, to the forward wing spar, with a strut between their upper joints.

The Type 161 flew for the first time on 21 January 1931. Further flight trials produced some modifications, largely to improve yaw stability. The rudder was broadened and rounded at the top, and small fins were added above and below the tailplane at the boom mounting point. There were also alterations to the geometry and gearing of the elevator trim tabs: it has been suggested that the Type 161 may have been the first aircraft to have had inflight adjustable elevator trims. In September 1931 it went to RAF Martlesham Heath for trials, where no serious problems emerged and pilot's reports were positive. The gun-firing tests went well, with no detriment to airframe or performance. Despite that, neither the Type 161 or its competitor the Westland C.O.W. Gun Fighter were ordered and there was no further development of the COW gun for air to air use.

== Specifications ==
Data from

General characteristics

- Crew: 1
- Length: 23 ft 6 in (7.16 m)
- Wingspan: 32 ft 0 in (9.75 m)
- Height: 12 ft 4 in (3.76 m)
- Wing area: 270 sq ft (25 m^{2})
- Empty weight: 2,381 lb (1,080 kg)
- Gross weight: 3,350 lb (1,520 kg)
- Powerplant: 1 × Bristol Jupiter VIIF 9-cylinder radial engine, 530 hp (400 kW)

Performance

- Maximum speed: 185 mph (298 km/h, 161 kn) at 10,000 ft (3,000 m)
- Time to altitude: 5.8 min to 10,000 ft (3,000 m)

Armament

- Guns: 1× COW 37 mm gun

== See also ==
Aircraft of comparable role, configuration, and era

- Westland C.O.W. Gun Fighter
