= Westland C.O.W. Gun Fighter =

Type of aircraft

C.O.W. Gun Fighter
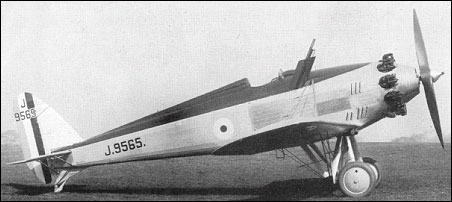

General information
- Type: Interceptor
- Manufacturer: Westland Aircraft
- Status: Prototype only
- Number built: 1

History
- First flight: December 1930
- Developed from: Westland Interceptor

The Westland C.O.W. Gun Fighter was an attempt to produce a fighter aircraft armed with a heavy calibre gun. The Coventry Ordnance Works (COW) 37 mm automatic gun was used, which had been developed for this purpose some years earlier.

== Design and development ==
The design was in response to Air Ministry specification F.29/27. The design was an open cockpit single engined metal monoplane with fabric covering. The aircraft design had already been submitted for specification F.20/27 as the Westland Interceptor but had lost out to the Gloster Gauntlet. The gun was in the fuselage and fired up at an angle, in order to attack bombers from below. This concept was similar to the Schräge Musik system used by Germany during World War II. The plane first flew at the end of 1930 but the trials did not give satisfactory results to continue with the idea.

The COW gun had been developed by 1918 for use in aircraft and had been trialled on the Airco DH.4.

== Specifications (C.O.W. Gun Fighter) ==
Data from Westland Aircraft since 1915

General characteristics

- Crew: 1
- Length: 29 ft 10 in (9.09 m)
- Wingspan: 40 ft 10 in (12.45 m)
- Height: 10 ft 7 in (3.23 m)
- Wing area: 223 sq ft (20.7 m^{2})
- Airfoil: RAF 34
- Empty weight: 2,615 lb (1,186 kg)
- Gross weight: 3,885 lb (1,762 kg)
- Powerplant: 1 × Bristol Mercury IIIA 9-cylinder air-cooled radial piston engine, 485 hp (362 kW)
- Propellers: 2-bladed fixed-pitch propeller

Performance

- Maximum speed: 185 mph (298 km/h, 161 kn) at 13,000 ft (3,962 m)
- Service ceiling: 27,900 ft (8,500 m)
- Absolute ceiling: 29,400 ft (8,961 m)
- Time to altitude: 10,000 ft (3,048 m) in 7 minutes
- Wing loading: 17.4 lb/sq ft (85 kg/m^{2})
- Power/mass: 0.12 hp/lb (0.20 kW/kg)

Armament

- Guns: One fixed upward firing 1½ lb (37 mm) COW 37 mm gun with 39 rounds

== See also ==
Related development

- Westland Interceptor

Aircraft of comparable role, configuration, and era

- Vickers Type 161

== Bibliography ==
- Ford, Daniel (March–April 1999). "Round-Out". Air Enthusiast (80): 78. ISSN 0143-5450.
- James, Derek N. Westland Aircraft since 1915. London: Putnam, 1991. ISBN 0-85177-847-X.
- Mason, Francis K. The British Fighter since 1912. Annapolis, Maryland: Naval Institute Press, 1992. ISBN 1-55750-082-7.
