= Gunfighter (disambiguation) =

A gunfighter is a man in the American Old West who had gained a reputation as being dangerous with a gun.

The Gunfighter(s) or Gunfighter(s) may also refer to:

== Aircraft ==
- A type of fighter aircraft equipped with guns
- Westland C.O.W. Gun Fighter, 1930 fighter-interceptor

== Books ==
- The Gunfighters, by John S. Daniels 1961
- The Gunfighters, by Bill Pronzini 1991

== Film and television ==
- The Gunfighter (1917 film), American silent film starring William S. Hart
- The Gunfighter (1923 film), a 1923 American silent western film
- Gunfighters (film), a 1947 American Western film directed by George Waggner
- The Gunfighter, a 1950 American Western film starring Gregory Peck
- The Gunfighter, a 1983 Filipino film starring Lito Lapid
- The Gunfighter (2014 film), a short film narrated by Nick Offerman
- The Gunfighters (1987 film), an American television film starring George Kennedy
- Gunfighter, a 1999 television Western directed by Christopher Coppola
- The Gunfighters (Doctor Who), a 1966 serial in the British science fiction television programme Doctor Who
- "The Gunfighter" (Justified), a 2012 episode of the TV series Justified
- "The Gunfighter", an episode of the TV series Bordertown

== Other uses ==
- Gunfighter (Videopac game), a 1979 video game
- Lethal Enforcers II: Gun Fighters, a 1994 arcade game
- Gunfighter (comics), a 1948 serial comic book

== See also ==
- Gunslinger (disambiguation)
- Shootout, also known as a gunfight
