= Bristol Bagshot =

Prototype heavily armed British fighter

Type 95 Bagshot
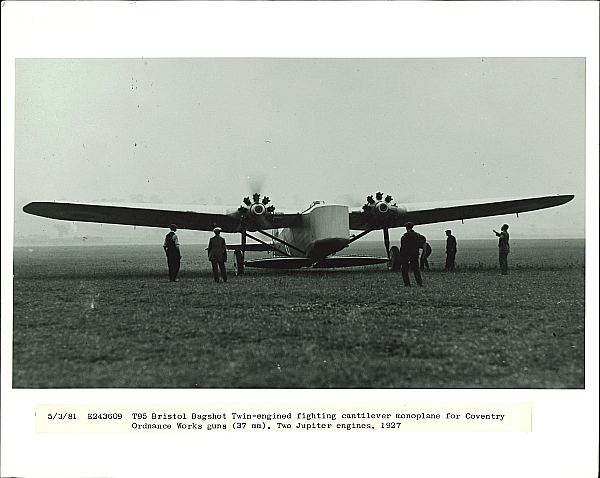

General information
- Type: Fighter
- National origin: United Kingdom
- Manufacturer: Bristol Aeroplane Company
- Designer: Frank Barnwell
- Number built: 1

History
- First flight: 15 July 1927

The Bristol Bagshot, also known as the Type 95, was a prototype heavily armed British fighter built by the Bristol Aeroplane Company and first flown in 1927. Flight testing revealed serious problems, and the project was abandoned.

== Development ==
The Bagshot was built to Air Ministry Specification F.4/24 in December 1924. This called for a large twin-engined fighter aircraft with a crew of three (pilot and two gunners), a maximum speed of 125 mph (201 km/h), and a landing speed of 50 mph (80 km/h). Initially, the details of the required armament were not specified. Frank Barnwell's design to meet this requirement, the Bagshot, was a high-wing all-metal monoplane with an unusual triangular-section fabric-covered steel-tube fuselage with two upper longerons and a single lower member. The pilot sat in line with the wing's leading edge, with one gun positioned in the nose and another just behind the wing. The two-spar wing had a steel primary structure and duralumin nose ribs and end-members, and was a semi-cantilever, braced by a pair of diagonal struts on each side. The legs of the fixed undercarriage met the wing at the same place as the struts and had an axle fairing of airfoil section, contributing some lift. Power was provided by two wing-mounted 450 hp (340 kW) Bristol Jupiter VI engines.

In September 1925 the Air Ministry amended the specification, calling for superchargers on the engines, increased fuel load and a higher top speed at altitude. Barnwell attended a design conference to discuss these new demands and was told that the purpose of the aircraft was to carry a pair of Coventry Ordnance Works [37 mm (1.5 in)] guns, generally called COW guns. When Barnwell received the full details of the required equipment, which included two Lewis guns in addition to the main armament, he realised that the aircraft would be overweight and have a landing speed of 57 mph (92 km/h). He suggested making an alternative fuselage of rolled steel strip to save weight, and abandoning the project as a waste of time if load testing of this proved unsatisfactory. The Air Ministry declined to cancel the contract and the Bagshot was completed, being provisionally accepted by the Air Ministry on 12 May 1927 and assigned serial number J7767.

== Operational history ==
The Bagshot was first flown without any armament at Filton on 15 July 1927 by Cyril Uwins, Bristol's chief test pilot. This first flight was short: 'Always a bad sign' remarked Archibald Russell (later Sir Archibald), who, at that time, was working in the stress calculations office at Filton. Uwins reported that control in the roll axis was poor. A second flight, during which Uwins increased the speed to 100 mph (160 km/h), revealed that the problem became worse as the speed increased. Uwins was unable to observe the wing's behaviour (He had a damaged neck thanks to an aircraft accident). It was decided that the aircraft was safe enough to carry an observer if the speed was kept down and Russell, who had recently been working on measuring the deflection of the aircraft's wing spars under load, was given the job. The rear gun position gave an excellent view of the wing. Uwins and Russell agreed on a simple system of hand signals to communicate. By the time the aircraft reached the agreed speed and height for the trials Russell was already very concerned. Although the "writhing movements" of the wing were "large and alarming" he had no signal to tell Uwins that enough was enough and so the whole planned flight program was flown. It was concluded that control reversal resulting from twisting of the wing when the ailerons were applied was the cause of the problems. The aircraft was grounded for a structural test to be made. It was transferred to the Air Ministry's experimental unit and briefly flown during 1931 but shortly afterwards broken up for scrap.

== Specifications ==
General characteristics

- Crew: three
- Length: 44 ft 11 in (13.69 m)
- Wingspan: 70 ft 0 in (21.34 m)
- Height: 9 ft 6 in (2.89 m)
- Wing area: 840 sq ft (78.04 m^{2})
- Empty weight: 5,100 lb (2,313 kg)
- Gross weight: 8,195 lb (3,717 kg)
- Powerplant: 2 × Bristol Jupiter VI radial , 450 hp (336 kW) each

Performance

- Maximum speed: 125 mph (201 km/h, 109 kn)

Armament

- 2 × COW 37 mm gun [37 mm (1.5 in) Coventry Ordnance Works cannon]
- 2 × Lewis .303 machine guns
