= Gunslinger (board wargame) =

Old West board wargame

Gunslinger is a board wargame published by Avalon Hill in 1982 that simulates gunfights and brawls in an Old West setting.

== Description ==
Gunslinger is a game for 2–7 players, each of whom controls one character engaged in sudden combat in a stereotypical Western town.

=== Components ===
Each player has a set of 12 double-sided cards that are used for initiative order, action designation and combat resolution. Each player also has a counter to represent the position of their character on a hex grid map that is formed from one or more eight 8" x 11" double-sided geomorphic tiles scaled at 6 feet per hex. One side of each tile displays rural terrain such as gullies, trees, corrals, watering troughs, wells, hitching posts, or Boot Hill , while the other side has part of a Western frontier town such as a bank, saloon or small store. Rural and town tiles can be mixed to produce the desired terrain. The hex grid is distorted to fit the buildings rather than the other way around, resulting in "hexagons" that have four, five, six or seven sides. Critic Jay Selover noted "This innovation is one of the most impressive accomplishments of the game. Hexes have always been used to regulate movement and range, but here they have finally been relegated to their proper positions as tools of the game designer, subordinated as needed to the realities of the true terrain."

=== Set-up ===
Each player selects one of 48 pregenerated characters. Each character has a name, and is defined by shooting and brawling skill, endurance, special abilities, ambidexterity, and standard weapons carried. Players can also create their own characters using guidelines provided in the rules.

The players select one of 26 scenarios, each of which has several variants. The scenarios cover most Western-themed combat situations, including High Noon- and OK Corral-type gunfights, bank robberies, and barroom brawls.

=== Gameplay ===
Each turn represents 2 seconds of game time. Each player selects an action to take such as movement, an attack, a defense, or utilizing strength (to add power to a throw or attack), and these are revealed simultaneously. The cards are then placed in order and executed from fastest to slowest.

Hitting a target with a firearm is influenced by range, skill of the attacker, and time spent aiming the weapon. There are nine possible body locations that can be hit, and 13 types of damage that can occur, from "Lose Aim" to "KIA".

Each scenario lasts for a set amount of time. Victory points are added up at the end of the scenario to determine a winner.

== Publication history ==
Gunslinger was designed by Richard Hamblen, and was published by Avalon Hill in 1982 as a boxed set with artwork by Charles Kibler, Scott Moores, Dale Sheaffer, and Chris White.

An identically named game of Western gunfighting had been published by Richard R. Sartore & Associates five years previously, but this had no connection to the Avalon Hill product.

== Reception ==
In Issue 36 of Fire & Movement, Jay Selover liked this game, writing, "Whoa, pardner! Don't skip this one." Given the small map scale and 2-second turns, Selover called this a "micro-tactical wargame". He liked the combat system, and also admired the quality of the game components, noting that the ability mix and match town and rural elements meant that "the possible configurations are innumerable." Selover warned that "without time limits, you can spend 10 minutes on a two-second turn and thus five hours to simulate a one-minute gunfight." However, Selover concluded on a positive note, writing, "this game can be habit-forming. ¡Vaya con Dios, desperado!"

In Issue 27 of the Australian wargaming magazine Queensland Wargamer, Eric Topp called this "one of the best multiplayer games ever made. It captures the glamour and excitement of the Old West in an authentic yet playable format. Most of the basics of the game system can be taught to a newcomer in a matter of minutes."

Writing for Black Gate, Ty Johnston pointed out that rules are not simple, but on the other hand, "gameplay is actually pretty fast once you’ve got a feel for the Gunslinger system." Johnston also believed that "the meticulous rules of this game make it one of the more realistic small-scale combat systems I've run across, far surpassing any rpg and bringing a strong dose of realism." Johnston concluded by recommending the game. "If you are a fan of all things Old West or if you’re an experienced war gamer, you might love Gunslinger. Experienced rpgers will also likely find a lot of love for Gunslinger. Beginners will probably be somewhat overwhelmed. But hey, everybody’s got to learn sometime, right?"

After giving a quick summary of how the game is played, Matt Sall warned, "The Gunslinger board game comes with MANY, MANY more rules for whatever amount of granularity you’d like. There are rules for different heights, horses, terrain features, dynamite, as well as a fully realized campaign and scenario guide." Sall concluded, "Overall, Gunslinger is the sort of Avalon Hill game I could get into. Macro enough to avoid getting bogged down, but enough options to really fine-tune to my liking."

On the website Do You Remember, Michael Johnson called this a game that "was actually really well thought out ... great at creating that old western cliché of the gunfight. It had a quick and easy game system that recreated the split-second nature of high noon!" Johnson concluded, "Real good fun, and like being in your own episode of Bonanza!

== Other recognition ==
A copy of Gunslinger is held in the collection of the Strong National Museum of Play (object 116.78490).
