= COW 37 mm gun =

Ordnance QF 1½ pdr Mk III
- Type: Autocannon
- Place of origin: United Kingdom

Service history
- In service: 1918 - 1940s
- Used by: United Kingdom

Production history
- Designer: Coventry Ordnance Works
- Manufacturer: Coventry Ordnance Works
- Variants: Mk III, Mk IV

Specifications
- Mass: 200 pounds (91 kg) for cradle, gun & breech
- Length: 91.8 inches (2.33 m) total
- Barrel length: bore of 75 inches (1.9 m)
- Shell: 37x190 HE 1 lb 7 oz (0.65 kg) or armour-piercing
- Calibre: 37 mm (1.457 in)
- Barrels: 1
- Action: automatic, long recoil
- Rate of fire: 90 rpm
- Muzzle velocity: 1,950 ft/s
- Effective firing range: 4,500 yd (4.1 km)
- Feed system: 5 round clip

The COW 37 mm gun was a British automatic cannon that was developed during First World War as a large-calibre aircraft weapon. It was tested in several installations and specified for the Westland C.O.W. Gun Fighter for attacking bombers. The tests did not yield satisfactory results and the weapon did not enter general service except on a few flying boats. The design was later adapted as the basis of the Vickers S, which saw some service during the Second World War as an anti-armour weapon.

== Design and development ==
Coventry Ordnance Works had been set up in 1905 by a consortium of British shipbuilding firms (John Brown, Cammell Laird and Fairfield) to compete with the duopoly of Vickers and Armstrong-Whitworth in producing naval guns. Besides the larger naval gun, COW worked at the smaller end on anti-aircraft guns. There was a demand for a weapon that could be mounted on an aircraft. Their first attempt at an automatic gun was a "1-pounder" (the nominal weight of the shell) from a rimless 37x94 cartridge. This developed into a 1½-pounder using a longer 37x190 cartridge in a five-round clip. The gun was ready to produce only as the First World War came to an end and was only in service briefly, having been fitted to a pair of Airco DH4s.

After the war it was used in a number of different aircraft, mostly flying boats such as the Blackburn Perth, where it was seen as being effective against small vessels. The Air Ministry also requested fighter designs based around the weapon, such as the Westland C.O.W. Gun Fighter, the Vickers Type 161 and the unsuccessful Bristol Bagshot heavy fighter.

After Vickers acquired the Coventry Ordnance Works, the COW 37 mm was used for the development of the 40 mm Vickers S gun which was used by Hawker Hurricanes as an anti-tank weapon. In the Second World War, COW guns were used as the armament for the Mk III version of the Armadillo armoured fighting vehicle, the COW gun with its shield mounted on the rear part of the flatbed. The vehicle was used by the RAF Regiment and later by the Home Guard.

== Use ==
Specification 4/24

- Westland Westbury - One in trainable mount, one fixed mounting
- Bristol Bagshot - Two in trainable mountings

Specification F9/27

- Westland C.O.W. Gun Fighter One in fixed mounting
- Vickers Type 161 - One in fixed mounting

Flying boats

- Armstrong Whitworth Sinaia
- Short Cromarty
- Vickers Valentia - tested
- Blackburn Iris
- Short Sarafand
- Blackburn Perth - fitted
- Short Sunderland - planned but not fitted

== See also ==
- QF 1 pounder pom-pom
