= Shootout (disambiguation) =

Shootout is a gun battle between armed groups (the article includes a list of notable shootouts).

Shootout, shoot-out, or shoot out may also refer to:

== Arts and entertainment ==
=== Film and TV ===
- Duke City Shootout, a movie-making contest
- Shoot Out, a 1971 American Western film
- Shoot Out (TV series), an Australian association football series, 2012–2019
- Shoot Out 24-Hour Filmmaking Festival, Newcastle, Australia (1999–2008), also known simply as "The Shoot Out"
- The Shootout (film), a 1992 Hong Kong action film
- Shootout (TV series), an American talk and interview show, 2003–2008
- Shootout!, an American TV documentary series, 2005–2006
- Shootout, an Indian crime action film series, including:
  - Shootout at Lokhandwala (2007)
  - Shootout at Wadala (2013)

=== Music ===
- Shootout (album), by The Mother Hips, 1996

=== Video games ===
- Shootout (1985 video game)
- Shootout! The Game, a video game (after the 2005 TV series)

== Sport ==
- Penalty shootout, a method of determining a winner in sports matches that would have otherwise been drawn or tied
  - Penalty shoot-out (association football)
  - Penalty shoot-out (field hockey)
  - Shootout (ice hockey)
- Shootout (poker), a poker tournament format
- Snooker Shoot Out, a tournament in snooker
