= Coventry Ordnance Works =

British weapons manufacturer

Coordinates: 52°25′8.12″N 1°29′34.73″W

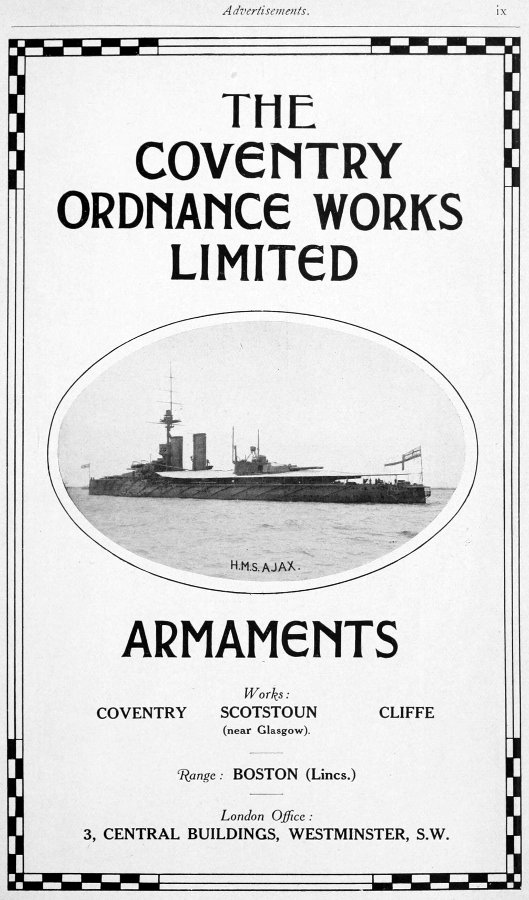
Advertisement Brassey's Naval Annual 1915

Coventry Ordnance Works was a British manufacturer of heavy guns particularly naval artillery jointly owned by Cammell Laird & Co of Sheffield and Birkenhead, Fairfield Shipbuilding and Engineering Company of Govan, Glasgow and John Brown & Company of Clydebank and Sheffield. Its core operations were from a 60-acre (24 ha) site in Stoney Stanton Road in the English city of Coventry, Warwickshire.

At the end of 1918 it became a principal constituent of a brand new enterprise English Electric Company Limited. After World War II the works made electricity-generating machinery and heavy machine tools.

== History ==
=== Consortium ===
The company, the Coventry Ordnance Works Limited, was formed in July 1905 by a consortium of British shipbuilding firms John Brown 50 percent, Cammell Laird 25 percent and Fairfield 25 percent with the encouragement of the British government, which wanted a third major arms consortium to compete with the duopoly of Vickers Sons & Maxim and Sir W G Armstrong Whitworth & Co to drive down prices. The new company bought (as from 1 January 1905, six months earlier) from Cammell Laird the ordnance business established in the late 1890s by H H Mulliner and F Wigley which had been moved by them in 1902 from Birmingham to the 60-acre (24 ha) site in Coventry's Stoney Stanton Road. (Note: Messrs Mulliner’s works in Coventry The Coventry Evening Telegraph of Tuesday 25 February 1902 reported that Mulliners had purchased the premises on Stoney Stanton Road built for Mr Hooley's cycle-tube manufactory where they were erecting new workshops which when complete would cover the area from the canal bank almost to Red Lane. They forecast "Before many months are past 1,000 hands will be employed initially on making gun carriages for the War Office and Admiralty." The railway line was to be extended from the brick works across the highway to the northern end of Mulliner’s works.) The ordnance business had been bought from Mulliner and Wigley by Charles Cammell & Co., later Cammell Laird, in 1903. (Note: Coventry Evening Telegraph Friday 20 February 1903 "Mulliner Wigley & Co, carriage manufacturers etc of Coventry and Birmingham is being acquired by Charles Cammell Limited, iron and steel manufacturers of Sheffield")

=== Further expansion ===
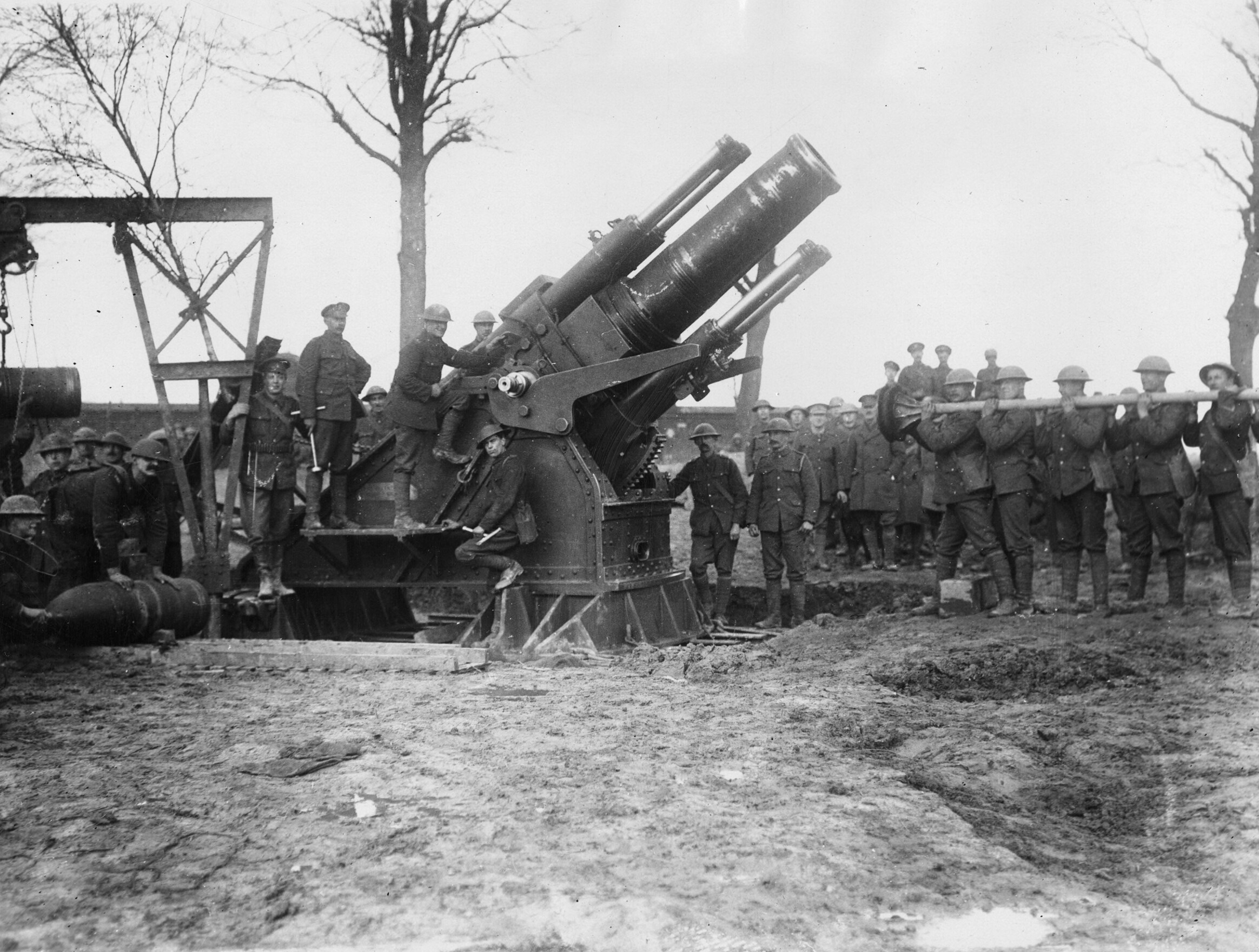
15-inch howitzer Dainville 10 April 1917

By 1909 Coventry Ordnance Works had establishments, as well as at Coventry, at Scotstoun for manufacture of ordnance and gun equipment; for cordite shell loading and explosive magazines at Cliffe; and a gun-proving ground with a land range of 22,000 yards at Boston and was handling an order for 12 inch mountings of one of the new battleships. While to that time the works had been manufacturing the smaller sizes of Naval Guns and Mountings as well as Guns, Gun carriages, Ammunition and other military accessories, they had already extended their works since 1906 and had begun the manufacture of Guns and Turrets up to the largest sizes for both Battleships and Cruisers for the Admiralty. At Scotstoun a new factory had been built with a wet dock, pits and machinery for the erection and transhipping of the heaviest guns and mountings and hydraulic barbettes of the firm's own design but it was unused until 1911. A complete factory for the manufacture of Fuzes had also been installed in Coventry.

=== Admiralty ===
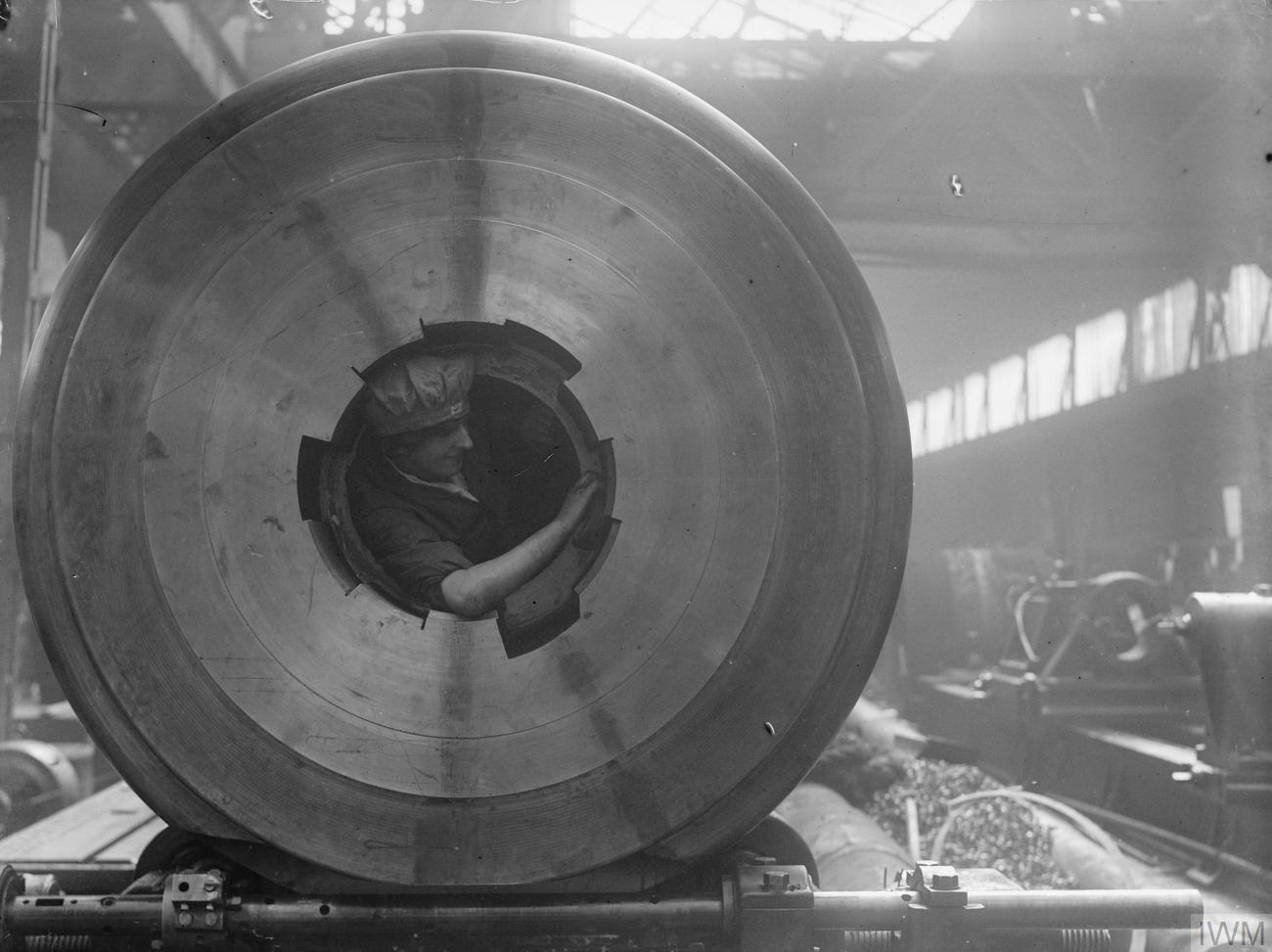
Woman cleaning the rifling of a 15-inch howitzer

To this point Herbert Hall Mulliner (1861–1924) had continued as managing director, but after a long series of altercations with the Admiralty he was asked to resign, compensated, and replaced 3 February 1910 by the 46-year-old Rear-Admiral R. H. S. Bacon (Note: "At a salary of £7,000 a year for seven years." The Navy Estimates. House Of Commons. The Times, Thursday, 17 Mar 1910; pg. 8; Issue 39222 "Few of Bacon's contemporaries denied his brilliance, but many felt that he was also blinkered, arrogant, slow to acknowledge his mistakes, and a poor leader of men." Historian Mike Dash observes that while "there is no doubt that [his] mastery of the technology with which he dealt reinforced the independence of the submarine branch, he was a remote and stubborn centraliser who rarely admitted he needed help from anybody". Dash, Michael. British Submarine Policy 1853-1918. Unpublished PhD thesis, Department of War Studies, King's College London, 1990, p. 158) who had been the Admiralty's Director of Naval Ordnance since August 1907. By early February with Admiral Bacon on board and Mulliner off it the directors could report an order from the British Admiralty for the mountings of all the heavy guns of one of the latest battleships that brought into operation for the first time the most costly and most important part of the company's new plant ending a long difficult period for Coventry Ordnance Works. Early in 1915 Bacon was appointed to the Royal Marines.

== World War I ==
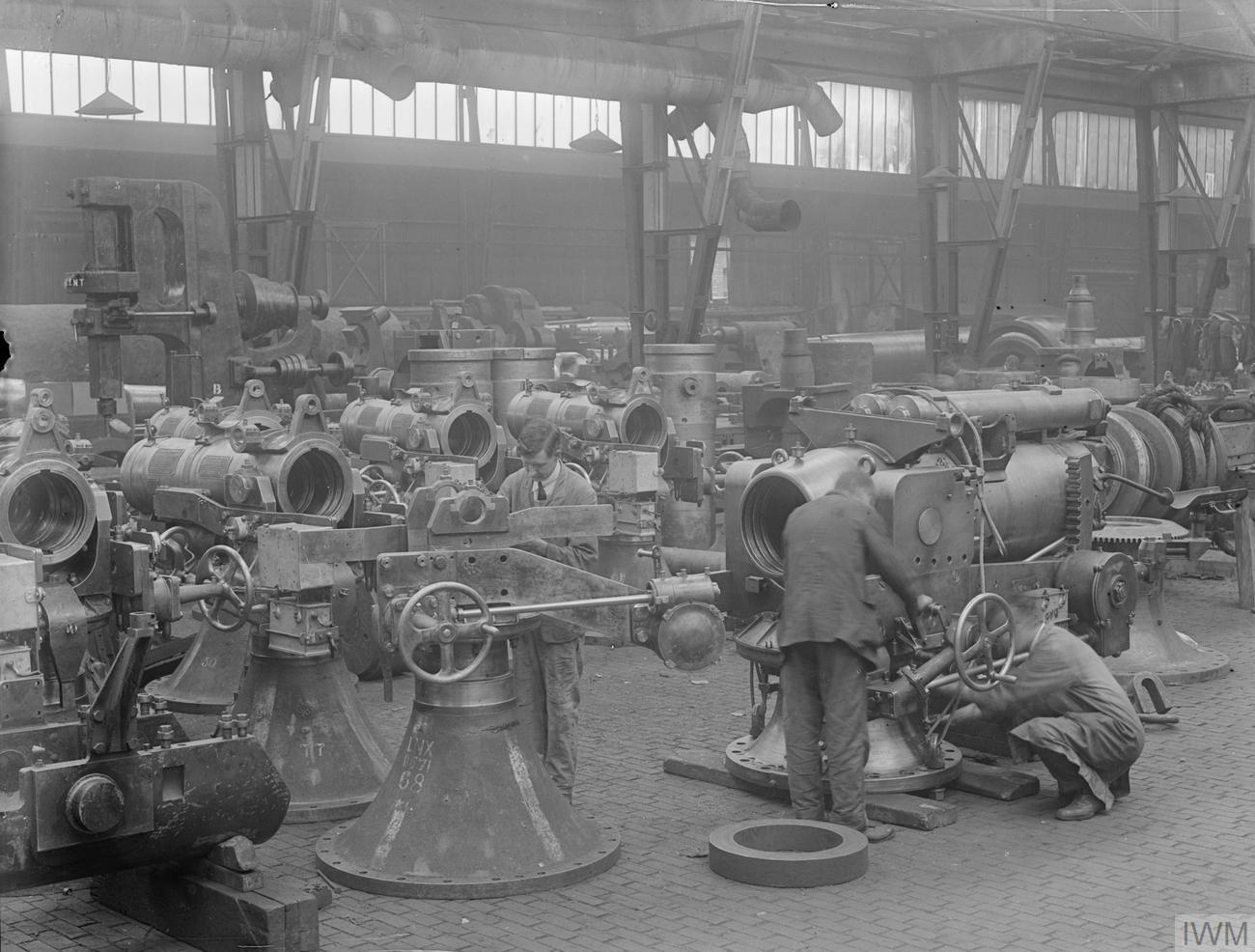
Work on naval gun mountings

Coventry Ordnance Works designed and built:

- the highly successful QF 4.5 inch Howitzer which entered service in 1910,
- Coventry Ordnance Works Biplane a 1912 military aircraft
- the 5.5 inch Naval gun 1913, and
- the 15 inch siege howitzer completed 1914 for the British Army.
- Their C.O.W. 37mm gun was the first modern autocannon developed in 1917.

== Interwar ==
At their Annual General Meeting four days after the armistice Dick, Kerr & Co Limited announced a provisional agreement for amalgamation with Coventry Ordnance Works Limited. Subsequently English Electric Company Limited was formed at the end of 1918 to own all the shares of Coventry Ordnance Works, Phoenix Dynamo Manufacturing Company and Dick Kerr & Co together with the United Electric Car Company and Willans & Robinson. It was anticipated that the new combine would be one of the three principal electrical manufacturing concerns in the country. It was intended that its business would be in large schemes such as the electrification of railways, the construction of large central power stations and the development of hydro-electric installations.

=== Coventry ===
It struggled in the recession after the end of World War I which affected Britain's arms industry and closed in 1925.

=== Scotstoun ===
Harland and Wolff, who took over the Scotstoun, Glasgow, works from Coventry Ordnance Works in 1920, converted it for diesel engine manufacture. Little investment was made and the firm had to seek civil engineering contracts away from shipbuilding in order to minimise losses. In 1927 the factory was put on a care and maintenance basis.

== World War II ==
The beginning of a national rearmament programme in 1936 prompted the re-commissioning of the works to make gun mountings.

== Postwar ==
After the war, they continued to build naval guns into the late 1960s, building the "standard" 4.5-inch turrets for the County class destroyers and other classes. Barrels were brought in from Vickers-Armstrongs but in earlier times they were made locally at Beardmores in Parkhead. Work was also switched to the manufacture of hydro-electric plant for the North of Scotland Hydro-Electric Board. Notable examples are the turbines for Cruachan power station and the Snowy Mountains scheme in Australia. The company also produced 'Danly' steel presses for the motor industry, supplied to British Pressed Steel at Linwood, Paisley, Longbridge, Dagenham and Liverpool.

In 1969 the works was sold to Albion Motors, whose main factory had been situated on the opposite side of South Street.

This factory had some of the largest machine tools in the UK. One, a vertical boring mill had a turntable 36-feet in diameter, used for machining the gun turret gear rings. This and other machines lent themselves to the machining of large turbine casing castings for the hydro-electric schemes. The building had three tiers of overhead cranes and could together lift several hundred tons. The building still continues to manufacture automotive parts under the ownership of Albion, now a subsidiary of American Axle.

== Bibliography ==
- Johnston, Ian; Buxton, Ian (2013). The Battleship Builders - Constructing and Arming British Capital Ships (Hardback). Annapolis, Maryland: Naval Institute Press. ISBN 978-1-59114-027-6.
