= Aubrey =

- Gender: Unisex
- Language: French

Origin
- Meaning: ruler of elves (masculine), elf council (feminine)

Other names
- Variant forms: Aubree, Aubrie, Aubery

Aubrey (/ˈɔːbri/) is a unisex English name. It was common for men and women in the Middle Ages but then lost favour for a time before experiencing a resurgence of popularity for men in the 19th century.

In the United States, following the 1973 release of the song "Aubrey" by the band Bread, the name began increasing in popularity as a given name for girls, potentially influenced by its similarity to Audrey. In 2023, Aubrey was the 101st most popular girls' name in the United States.

== Etymology ==
The medieval masculine name Aubrey is from the Norman French derivation Aubry of the Germanic given name Alberic / Old High German given name Alberich, which consists of the elements alb 'elf' and ric 'power' or 'ruler', Before it was largely replaced by Aubrey after the Norman Conquest of England, the Anglo-Saxons used the native form Ælfrīc.

The medieval feminine name "Aubrey" was independently derived from the Norman French derivation of the Germanic name Albreda, which consists of the elements alb 'elf' and radi 'council'; it had fallen out of use entirely by the 15th century. The form Aubrée was common in Normandy before the Conquest.

== Notable people ==
=== Surname ===
- Andrew Aubrey, Lord Mayor of London in 1339, 1340, and 1351
- Anne Aubrey (born 1935), English actress
- Brandon Aubrey (born 1995), American soccer player and American football placekicker
- Emlyn Aubrey (born 1964), US golfer
- Various persons named James Aubrey
- Various persons named John Aubrey
- Juliet Aubrey (born 1966), English actress
- Matthew Aubrey (born 1997), Welsh rugby union player
- Michael Aubrey (born 1982), American baseball player
- Sam Aubrey (1922–2008), American basketball player and coach
- Sarah Aubrey, Australian actress
- Stuart Aubrey (born 1990), Australian politician
- William Aubrey (died 1595), Welsh lawyer, judge and politician
- William Aubrey (engineer) (1759–1827), Welsh engineer

=== Given name ===
==== Pre-nineteenth century ====
- Aubrey (archbishop of Reims), Archbishop of Reims from 1207 to 1218
- Aubrey de Coucy, Earl of Northumbria from 1080 to about 1086
- Aubrey de Troisfontaines (died c. 1250), French chronicler of the 13th century
- Aubrey de Vere I (died c. 1110), 11th-century Anglo-Norman knight
- Aubrey de Vere II (c. 1080–1141), 12th-century Lord Great Chamberlain of England
- Aubrey de Vere III (c. 1115–94), first Earl of Oxford
- Aubrey de Vere IV (c. 1170–1214), second Earl of Oxford
- Aubrey de Vere, 10th Earl of Oxford (c. 1338–1400)
- Aubrey de Vere, 20th Earl of Oxford (1627–1703), Royalist during the Civil War
- Aubrey of Buonalbergo (c. 1030–1122), first wife of Robert Guiscard

==== Nineteenth century ====
- Aubrey Beardsley (1872–1898), English artist, illustrator, and author
- Aubrey Beauclerk, 5th Duke of St Albans (1740–1802), British landowner
- Aubrey Beauclerk, 6th Duke of St Albans (1765–1815), English aristocrat and politician
- Aubrey de Vere Hunt (1761–1818), Irish politician, landowner and businessman
- Sir Aubrey de Vere, 2nd Baronet (1788–1846), Irish baronet
- Aubrey Spencer (1795–1872), English Anglican bishop
- Aubrey Thomas de Vere (1814–1902), Irish poet

==== Modern era ====
- Aubrey Abbott (1886–1975), Australian politician
- Aubrey Aitken (1911–1985), English Anglican bishop
- Aubrey Anderson-Emmons (born 2007), American actress
- Aubrey Ankrum (born 1972), American screenwriter, animator and actor
- Aubrey Baartman (born 1958), South African politician
- Aubrey Beavers (born 1971), American football player
- Aubrey Begg (1929–1988), New Zealand politician
- A. Aubrey Bodine (1906–1970), American photographer
- Aubrey Boomer (1897–1989), Jersey golfer
- Aubrey Brain (1893–1955), British horn player and teacher
- Aubrey Burks (born 2002), American football player
- Aubrey Burl (1926–2020), British archaeologist
- Aubrey Buxton, Baron Buxton of Alsa (1918–2009), British soldier and television executive
- Aubrey Casewell (1909–1974), Welsh rugby league footballer
- Aubrey Vanderbilt Cecil (born 1990), American jewelry designer
- Aubrey "Dit" Clapper (1907–1978), Canadian hockey player
- Aubrey Coleman (born 1987), American basketball player
- Aubrey Cottle, Canadian hacker
- Aubrey Coverley (1895–1953), Australian politician
- Aubrey David (born 1990), Guyanese-Trinidadian international footballer
- Aubrey Dawkins (born 1995), American basketball player
- Aubrey Dexter (1898–1958), British actor
- Aubrey Devine (1897–1981), American football player
- Aubrey W. Dirlam (1913–1995), American politician
- Aubrey Dollar (born 1980), American actress
- Aubrey Solomon Meir Eban (1915–2002), the birth name of Israeli diplomat Abba Eban
- Aubrey Edwards (born 1987), American video game developer and wrestling referee
- Aubrey Faulkner (1881–1930), South African cricketer
- Aubrey Fitch (1883–1978), American admiral
- Aubrey David (born 1990), Guyanese footballer
- Aubrey de Grey (born 1963), English gerontologist
- Aubrey de Sélincourt (1894–1962), English classicist
- Aubrey Dunn Jr., American politician
- Aubrey Ellwood (1897–1992), British Royal Air Force commander
- Aubrey Fitzgerald (1874–1968), British actor
- Aubrey Fowler (1920–1996), American football player
- Aubrey Galvan (born 2006), American basketball player
- Aubrey Drake Graham (born 1986), birth name of Canadian musician, actor, and entrepreneur Drake
- Aubrey Givens (1912–1983), American football and basketball coach
- G. Aubrey Goodman (1862–1921), Barbadian barrister and politician
- Aubrey Gordon (born 1983), "Your Fat Friend", author, podcaster, and activist
- Aubrey Griffin (born 2001), American basketball player
- Aubrey Haynie (born 1974), American bluegrass musician
- Aubrey Herbert (1880–1923), British colonel and diplomat
- Aubrey Hodges (born 1966), American musician
- Aubrey Huff (born 1976), American baseball player
- Aubrey Kelly, American football coach
- Aubrey Koch (1904–1975), Australian pilot
- Aubrey Kingsbury (born 1991), American soccer player
- Aubrey "Aub" Lawson (1914–1977), Australian speedway rider
- Aubrey Layne (born 1956), American government official
- Aubrey Leach (born 1996), American softball player
- Aubrey Lewis (1900–1975), Australian psychiatrist
- Aubrey Lyles (1883–1932), African-American performer and lyricist with FE Miller as "Miller and Lyles"
- Aubrey Jones (1911–2003), British politician
- Aubrey Joseph (born 1997), American rapper and actor
- Aubrey Luck (1900–1999), Australian politician
- Aubrey Lyles (1884–1932), American vaudeville performer
- Aubrey Mallalieu (1873–1948), English actor
- Aubrey Manning (1930–2018), English zoologist and broadcaster
- Aubrey Mather (1885–1958), English actor
- Aubrey McClendon (1959–2016), American businessman, oil and natural gas pioneer
- Aubrey McDade (born 1981), United States Marine
- Aubrey McDonald (born 1988), South African rugby union player
- Aubrey Matthews (born 1962), American football player
- Aubrey Miles (born 1980), Filipina actress
- Aubrey Miller Jr. (born 1999), American football player
- Aubrey Morris (1926–2015), English actor
- Aubrey Modiba (born 1995), South African soccer player
- Aubrey Nealon (born 1971), Canadian film and television director, producer and writer
- Aubrey Newman (1904–1994), American general
- Aubrey Newman (historian) (born 1927), British historian
- Aubrey Ngoma (born 1989), South African footballer
- Aubrey Nunn (born 1966), British bass guitarist, member of Faithless
- Aubrey J. O'Brien (1870–1930), British soldier and writer on India
- Aubrey O'Day (born 1984), American singer
- Aubrey Peeples (born 1993), American actress and singer
- Aubrey Plaza (born 1984), American actress
- Aubrey Pleasant, American football coach
- Aubrey Powell (disambiguation), several people
- Aubrey Reese (born 1978), American basketball player
- Aubrey Richards (1920–2000), Welsh actor
- Aubrey Richmond (1957–2025), Guyanese cyclist
- Aubrey Robinson (disambiguation), several people
- Aubrey Schenck (1908–1999), American film producer
- Aubrey Scotto (1895–1953), American film director
- Aubrey Sherrod (born 1962), American basketball player
- Aubrey Simons (1921–2014), English table tennis player
- Aubrey Smith (disambiguation), several people
- Aubrey Strahan (1852–1928), British geologist
- Aubrey Suwito, Malaysian musician
- Aubrey Swanepoel (born 1989), South African cricketer
- W. Aubrey Thomas (1866–1951), American scientist and politician
- Aubrey Willard (1894–1961), Australian tennis player
- Aubrey Williams (disambiguation), several people
- Aubrey Wisberg (1909–1990), British–American filmmaker
- Aubrey Woods (1928–2013), British actor

=== Fictional characters ===
- Jack Aubrey, one of the protagonists from Patrick O'Brian's Aubrey–Maturin series
- Aubrey Valentine, in the BBC soap opera EastEnders
- Aubrey, the principal character of the 1980 eponymous ITV cartoon series Aubrey
- Aubrey, a main vampire in the novel Demon in My View by Amelia Atwater-Rhodes
- Aubrey James, the antagonist of Stroker Ace, a 1983 action comedy film
- Aubrey, the narrator and main character of The Vampyre by John Polidori
- Aubrey Posen, one of the main characters in the 2012 film Pitch Perfect
- Aubrey Aubergine, one of the Munch Bunch
- Aubrey Flemming, protagonist of the 2007 psychological thriller I Know Who Killed Me, portrayed by Lindsey Lohan
- Aubrey deLint, a character from David Foster Wallace's Infinite Jest
- Aubrey Little, a character played by Travis McElroy in The Adventure Zone
- Aubrey Le Camenbear, on Danger Mouse episode "Cheesemageddeon", played by Ben Diskin
- Aubrey, a song written by David Gates and originally released on the 1972 Bread album Guitar Man
- Aubrey Boyce, in the BBC sitcom Only Fools and Horses
- Aubrey, a character in the 2020 psychological horror role-playing video game Omori
- Queen Aubri, in The Swan Princess movie series
- James Aubrey, in Bones

== See also ==
- Alberic
- Audrey
- Aubry
- Oberon
