= Michael Antoine Garoutte =

French privateer in America (1750–1829)

Michel "Michael" Antoine Garoutte
- Born: April 12, 1750; Castle Garoutte, Marseille, Kingdom of France
- Died: April 29, 1829 (aged 79); Pleasant Mills, New Jersey, U.S.
- Burial place: Methodist Episcopal Cemetery In Pleasant Mills, New Jersey, United States
- Spouse: Quakeress Sophia Sophronia Smith
- Relatives: Brother to Lady Marie Magdeleine Garoutte-Lascour; Uncle to Antoine Joseph Marie d'Espinassy-Garoutte and Lady Claire Charlotte Espinassy-Garoutte; Cousin to King of France Louis Bourbon
- Military career
- Allegiance: Kingdom of France
- Branch: United States Navy
- Service years: 1774 - 1787
- Rank: Pirate, Privateer and Naval Officer
- Nicknames: Hyacinthe Garoutte; Michael of La Fayette ( Tavern ) Michael Garoutte of Espinassy
- Conflicts: American Revolutionary War; Battle of Chestnut Neck
- Awards: Chevalier of the Royal and Military Order of Saint Louis IX of the Kingdom of France
- Other work: Tavern Keeper of The La Fayette Tavern

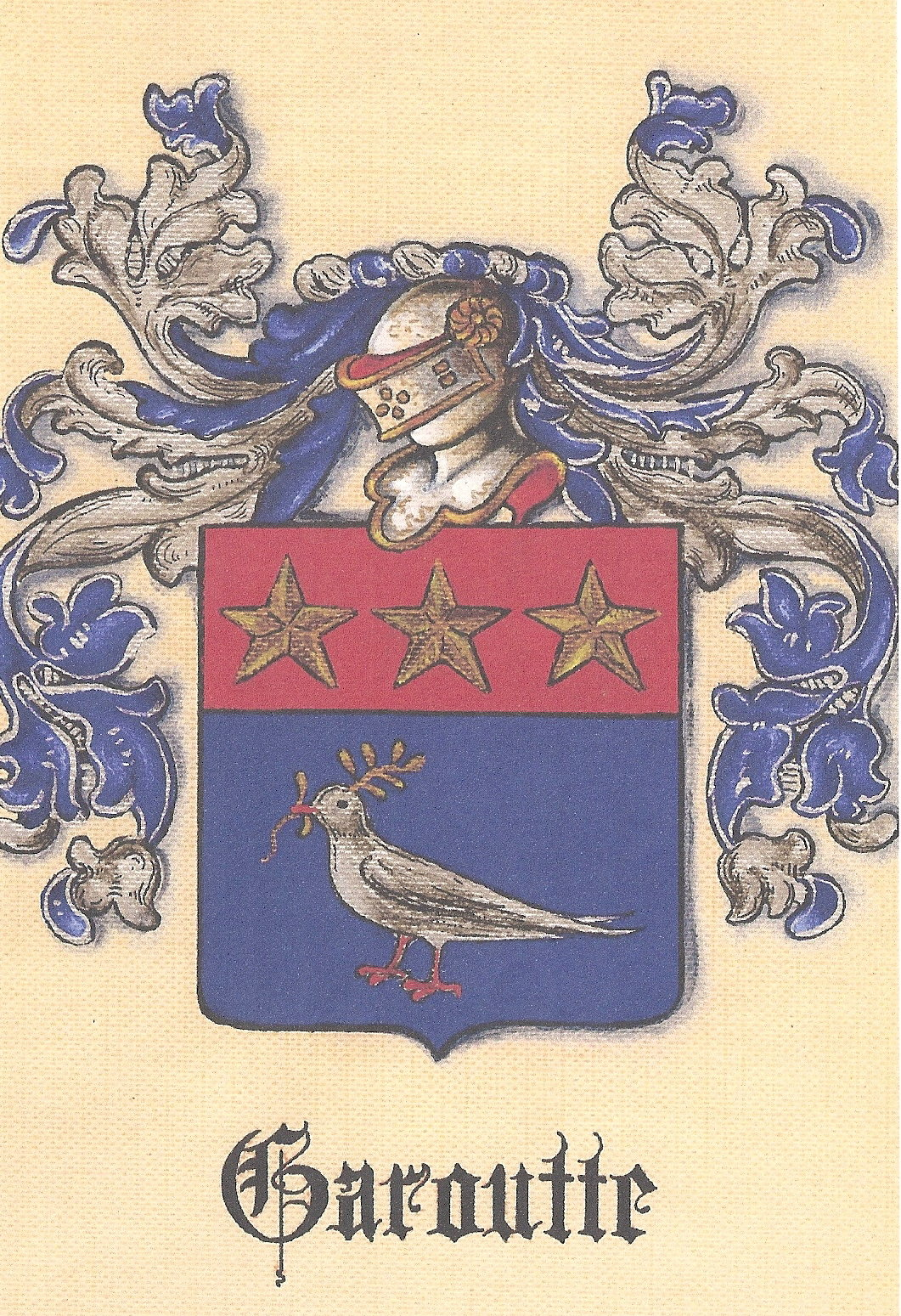
The Registered Coat of Arms For The Garoutte Family

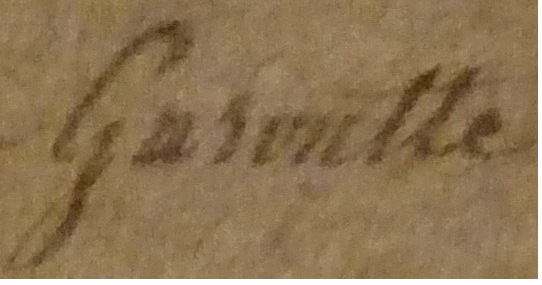
Handwritten Signature of Michel Antoine Garoutte

Michel Antoine Garoutte anglicized as: Michael Antoine Garoutte (12 April 1750 – 29 April 1829) was a member of the first nobility of Provence in the Kingdom of France. He was a Pirate and Privateer in the early war for American Independence and ascended to the rank of Lieutenant in the first American Continental Navy.

Michel Antoine Garoutte was one of the founding Catholics of the U.S. State Pennsylvania. He was the first owner of the La Fayette Tavern in Pleasant Mills, New Jersey, United States.

Michel Antoine Garoutte can be considered a founding father of the United States Navy because he donated two ships to the American Continental Navy in the American Revolutionary War.

== Early life ==
Garoutte was born on the 12 April 1750 in the Castle Garoutte in Marseille, Kingdom of France to the Lady, Marie Anne Félicité Lascour and the Admiral of the Royal French Navy, Antoine Garoutte. Michel Antoine Garoutte's maternal grandfather was the 6th Baron Henri de Lascour who was the cousin of Louis XV and was collaterally descended from the King of France Louis IX. He was baptized the following day at the oldest Catholic Parish of Marseille, Kingdom of France the Église Notre-Dame-des-Accoules Church.

He was brought up in training and educated as a Catholic Priest, but at the age of 15 his older brother died in battle with no heirs and Garoutte exited seminary and went to Military School and later Officers School in Paris.

Garoutte went to some of the same schools as his friend Marie-Joseph Paul Yves Roch Gilbert du Motier, the Marquis de LaFayette whose great-grandfather was the Baron of Vissac, Charles Motier of Champetierès. Garoutte spent many months living in the Castle de la Jaconnière in Signes, Kingdom of France with the d'Espinassy Family after the death of his older brother.

After being pardoned in the King Louis XVI court for dueling he sailed from Marseille, Kingdom of France commanding two ships to the New York Colony and fought in the War for American Independence.

== Military service ==
Garoutte was in the Battle of Chestnut Neck where the British burned down his ships in the Mullica River, New Jersey Colony. His Privateer activities involved overtaking British Merchant vessels and British Navy Vessels, taking the seized goods to Little Egg Harbor where the goods would be sent across the river through the Delaware and to Valley Forge to supply General George Washington's military forces. He also secured artillery for the Patriot military forces.

Garoutte later served on the brig-of-war Enterprise and sloop-of-war Racehorse as a naval officer in the American Continental Navy. Oral Family History and a vetted document proves that Garoutte owned and then donated these ships to the American Continental Navy. This makes Garoutte a founding father of the United States Navy just prior to its establishment as the United States Navy and permits membership in the Naval Society of the Cincinnati.

Shortly after the Battle of Chestnut Neck Garoutte went to retrieve his friend who was hiding in an Inn and he was ambushed by 7 Hessians. The Hessians stabbed Garoutte in his side with a bayonet and blunted his head leaving him for dead on the dirt road. He was found and assisted by John Smith a Quaker and innkeeper who was secretly aiding the American Revolutionaries. Michel's life was saved and he married John Smith's daughter, Sophia Smith.

== Return to France ==
Garoutte returned to the Kingdom of France arriving in 1787 where he was given gifts by the King Louis XVI and the Queen Marie Antoinette and again in January 1793 where his nephew was a member of the Council that decided Louis XVI's fate in the Trial of Louis XVI.

On his return to the Kingdom of France in 1787 his sister wrote the following letter:

Dear Sister-in-law:

I have seen with the greatest satisfaction my brother, your husband, after an absence of twelve years, without ever having heard from him. I assure you his arrival has given us the greatest pleasure, particularly so, as he informs me he has established himself and is so happy as to possess a respectable wife. I cannot think after all my brother has said, although he sets no bounds to the praises he gives you, yet I cannot help thinking he is inwardly chagrined, particularly when he speaks of his children. Can it be that my brother is not happy? Alas! He deserves to be for the natural goodness of his heart. Since he conceals his troubles from me, I address myself to you, madam, for to beg you to form me and shall be most happy if it is the means of removing them.

I will not conceal from you that your husband belongs to the first Nobility of Provence in France and, therefore, I beg you to be well persuaded of the sincere friendship with which I am for life, madam, dear Sister-in-law,

Your very humble servant,

Magdeleine Garoutte D'Espinassy

P.S. Have the goodness to embrace for me and my husband, your dear children, in waiting until I have the pleasure of taking in my arms little Nancy, whom my brother has promised me and I agree to educate, conformable to the education of her Father. My son, who is Captain of the Corps of Royal Artillery, now is Captain Francois, is ignorant that his uncle is with us but my daughter, who enjoys with me the pleasure of her uncle's company, embraces her little cousins, waiting with impatience to see little Nancy.

== La Fayette Tavern ==
Garoutte started a Tavern in Pleasant Mills, New Jersey and named it The La Fayette Tavern undoubtedly after his childhood friend and school fellow the Marquis de La Fayette. Batsto-Pleasant Mills, New Jersey was a manufacturer of guns, cannons and cannonballs for use with the military forces for American Independence.

Garoutte's Tavern saw patrons the Corsican King of Spain Joseph Bonaparte and the Marquis de LaFayette among others. His tavern was well known in the day and was regarded as one of the best in New Jersey. Ebenezer Tucker was said to have complemented Garoutte on his Most pleasant inn.

== Death ==
Garoutte died on the 29 April 1829 at the age of 79 on the road in Pemberton, New Jersey determined to make his way back to France. He was buried in Pleasant Mills.

Garoutte mentioned in his journal that he was angry at John Sevier, Junior for stealing his daughter Sophia Garoutte from him and he "lost hope of ever seeing her again". He left the house of Governor John Sevier after Sevier took Garoutte's silver coins.

After he left he wrote the following entry in his journal:

I left the house of the blacksmith and the Seviers, after they had served me with the greatest villainy in the world, and I am determined after my death to make them know their evil conduct, and on October 23rd I arrived at the home of my daughter Mary Earling, after 4 days of walking, because I had left without having a penny in my pocket.

Garoutte then decided to sail back to France but he never made it.

== Lineage and Family ==
Garoutte belonged to a very old Provençal family of the nobility. He and his sister the Lady Marie Magdeleine Garoutte-Lascour and her family were French Revolutionaries as they were among the first French nobles to reform the French government in the French Revolution. Michel Antoine Garoutte's sister married the Baron of Signes, Kingdom of France César Antoine Espinassy-Venel.

Garoutte's favored nephew was Antoine Joseph Marie d'Espinassy who ascended to the rank of Army General in the French Revolutionary War and whose family was later responsible for the voted regicide of Louis-Auguste the 12th Duke of Berry who became the King of France as Louis XVI. The Garoutte-Espinassy family later married into the British royal family after meeting Ladies of the 6th Earl of Essex Arthur Algernon Capell the night before the Battle of Waterloo. The Lascour, Garoutte and Espinassy families were involved in the Spanish Monarchy and the French Monarchy for several traceable earlier centuries as their direct traceable ancestors are all referred to as Masters of their own noble and Royal House in the French Tongue: nobles de race, meaning that each family was part of the Hereditary Peerage of France. In later centuries this Espinassy family were deeply involved in the French Revolution. Espinassy's great-great-grandfather was a baron and held high rank in the French Military driving around Catherine de Medici. The Garoutte-Espinassy family later had close ties with Napoléon Buonaparte and this ended in Napoléon's capture at the Palais de Μalmaison and his death on Saint Hélènè Island. Antoine Joseph Marie d'Espinassy's grand daughter married Claud Joseph Ernest the Count of Narcillac du Chastil de Andelot Morval a French Royal Title created by King of France Louis VI and that family has another mode of descent from a French King.

Antoine Joseph Marie d'Espinassy was stationed on San Domingue Island which is present-day Haiti just prior to the Haitian Revolution where he was promoted by Royal Letter to Colonel in the French Royal Armed Forces by the King of France Louis XV and he later was promoted to rank of Lieutenant. Scattered documentation shows French routes from the Caribbean Islands to Continental Establishment coastal areas where they shipped guns, cannons, rifles and other materials to the French colonists in the Continental Establishments for use in the American Revolutionary War.

Michel Antoine Garoutte's niece the Lady Claire Charlotte Espinassy-Garoutte is academically famous for her written works namely History of Europe, History of France, How To Be a Lady and Nouvel Abrégé de l'Histoire de France à L'usage des Jeunes Gens—where the present-day nobility of numerous countries in the world as well as Universities still use these works to teach about the Nobility, European History and other topics.

The street named Garoutte in present-day Marseille, Republic of France is named after his family.

=== Connections To The Knights of Malta, Rhodes and Saint John of Jerusalem ===
The d'Lascours family ( Michaels mother's family ) have service in the Catholic Crusades in the Order of Malta.

=== Notable Marriages ===
- Garoutte's sister married the Baron of Signes, Southern France
- Garoutte's nephews married into the Earldom of Essex, England
- Garoutte's daughter married the son of John Sevier, Senior the founding father of the U.S. State of Tennessee

=== Military Bases ===
Several U.S. military bases are named after people in Garoutte's family.

=== Origins of The Name Garoutte ===
The name Garoutte has Occitan-Spanish origins and the Garoutte family was a Provençal Spanish Royal Family with French titles of nobility and royalty.

=== Superior Line To The Earldom of Essex and Titles of Royalty ===
Since Garoutte's nephews married into the Capel family by marrying a sister and a daughter of the 6th Earl of Essex where that 6th Earl of Essex is descended from the 4th Earl of Essex in England this places a superior claim to all others as of the year 2026. The eldest living male descendent of Michael Antoine Garoutte is line to numerous titles of nobility and royalty today across England, Scotland, France and Spain. Garoutte was also descended collaterally from the King of France, Louis IX through his grand-niece Agathe Capel. The name Capel was previously pronounced like "Cap-Ell" and the pronunciation changed upon the name change in the 20th century to "Cap-ul". Titles of Royalty and Nobility mentioned are:

- Marquis of Fontanelle, France
- Baron of Signes, France
- Baron of Lascour, France
- Count of Narcillac du Chastil de Andelot Morval, France
- Baron of Hadham, England
- Earl of Essex, England
