= Aubry =

Aubry is a French surname and given name. Notable people with the name include

- Aubry or Alberic of Trois-Fontaines (died c. 1252), medieval Cistercian chronicler who wrote in Latin
- Alan Aubry (born 1974), French photographer
- Augusto Aubry (1849–1912), Italian vice-admiral
- Cécile Aubry (1928–2010), French film actress and television screenwriter and director
- Charles Aubry
  - Charles Aubry (athlete), French professional long distance runner
  - Charles Aubry (jurist) (1803–1883), French jurist
- Charles Philippe Aubry (died 1770), governor of French Louisiana
- Emilie Aubry (born 1989), Swiss racing cyclist
- Etienne Aubry (1746–1781), French painter
- Gabriel Aubry (born 1975), French-Canadian fashion model
- Gilbert Aubry (born 1942), Roman Catholic bishop
- Gwenaëlle Aubry (born 1971), French novelist and philosopher
- Francois Xavier Aubry (1824–1854), French Canadian merchant and explorer of the American Southwest
- Jean-Frédéric-Emile Aubry (1882–1950), French music critic, translator and poet
- Jeffrion Aubry (born 1948), American politician from New York
- Louis-François Aubry (1770 – c. 1850), French portrait painter
- Manon Aubry (born 1989), French politician
- Marie Aubry (1656–1704), French operatic soprano
- Martine Aubry (born Martine Delors in 1950), French politician
- Nicolas Aubry, French priest who traveled to Acadia (now Canada) in 1604
- Octave Aubry (1881–1946), French novelist and historian
- Pascale Claude Aubry, the plaintiff in Aubry v Éditions Vice-Versa Inc, a leading Canadian Supreme Court case on privacy rights in Quebec
- Pierre Aubry (born 1960), Canadian ice hockey player
- René Aubry (born 1956), French composer
- Roger-Émile Aubry (1923–2010), Catholic bishop
- Serge Aubry (1942–2011), ice hockey player and coach
- Yves Aubry, Canadian ornithologist

== See also ==
- Aubrey
