= Short Mayo Composite =

British long-range air transport design (1937–1941)

S.20 Mercury
- Image from a contemporary newspaper article, depicting Mercury atop Maia

General information
- Type: Transport seaplane carried to flight altitude by Short S.21 Maia
- National origin: United Kingdom
- Manufacturer: Short Brothers
- Designer: Arthur Gouge; Robert Mayo
- Primary users: Imperial Airways RAF
- Number built: 1

History
- Introduction date: 14 July 1938
- First flight: 5 September 1937
- Retired: 1941

S.21 Maia

General information
- Type: Flying-boat, launch aircraft for S.20 Mercury
- National origin: United Kingdom
- Manufacturer: Short Brothers
- Designer: Arthur Gouge; Robert H. Mayo
- Status: destroyed by enemy bombing 11 May 1941
- Primary user: Imperial Airways
- Number built: 1

History
- Introduction date: 14 July 1938
- First flight: 27 July 1937

The Short Mayo Composite was a piggy-back long-range seaplane and flying boat combination produced by Short Brothers to provide a reliable long-range air transport service to North America and, potentially, to other distant places in the British Empire and the Commonwealth.

== Development ==
Short Brothers had built the Empire flying boats which were capable of operating long range routes in the British Empire but could only attempt the trans-Atlantic route by replacing passenger and mail-carrying space with extra fuel.

It was known that aircraft could maintain flight with a greater payload than that possible during take-off. Major Robert Mayo, the Technical General Manager at Imperial Airways, proposed mounting a small, long-range seaplane on top of a larger carrier aircraft, using the combined power of both to bring the smaller aircraft to operational height, at which time the two aircraft would separate, the carrier aircraft returning to base while the other flew on to its destination. The British Air Ministry issued Specification "13/33" to cover this project.

== Design ==
The Short-Mayo composite project, co-designed by Mayo and Shorts chief designer Arthur Gouge, comprised the Short S.21 Maia, (G-ADHK) which was a variant of the Short "C-Class" Empire flying-boat, fitted with a trestle or pylon on the top of the fuselage to support the Short S.20 Mercury(G-ADHJ). (Note: Named after Maia, the Greek goddess and mother of Hermes, messenger of the Gods, while Hermes was known to the Romans as Mercury.)

Although generally similar to the Empire boat, Maia differed considerably in detail: the hull sides were flared and had "tumblehome" rather than being vertical as on the Empire to increase the planing surface (necessary for the higher take-off weights); larger control surfaces; an increase in total wing area from 1,500 sq ft (140 m^{2}) to 1,750 sq ft (163 m^{2}); the engines were mounted further from the wing root to clear Mercury's floats and the rear fuselage was swept up to raise the tailplane relative to the wing. Like the Empire boats, Maia could be equipped to carry 18 passengers. Maia first flew (without Mercury) on 27 July 1937, piloted by Shorts' Chief Test Pilot, John Lankester Parker.

The upper component, Mercury, was a twin-float, four-engine seaplane crewed by a single pilot and a navigator, who sat in tandem in an enclosed cockpit. It could carry 1,000 lb (450 kg) of mail and 1,200 imp gal (5,500 L; 1,400 US gal) of fuel. Flight controls, except for elevator and rudder trim tabs, were locked in neutral until separation. Mercury's first flight, also piloted by Parker, was on 5 September 1937.

The mechanism that held the two aircraft together allowed for a small degree of movement. Lights indicated when the upper component was in fore-aft balance so trim could be adjusted prior to release. The pilots could then release their respective locks. At this point the two aircraft remained held together by a third lock which released automatically at 3,000 lbf (13,000 N). The design was such that at separation Maia would tend to drop while Mercury would climb.

== Operations ==
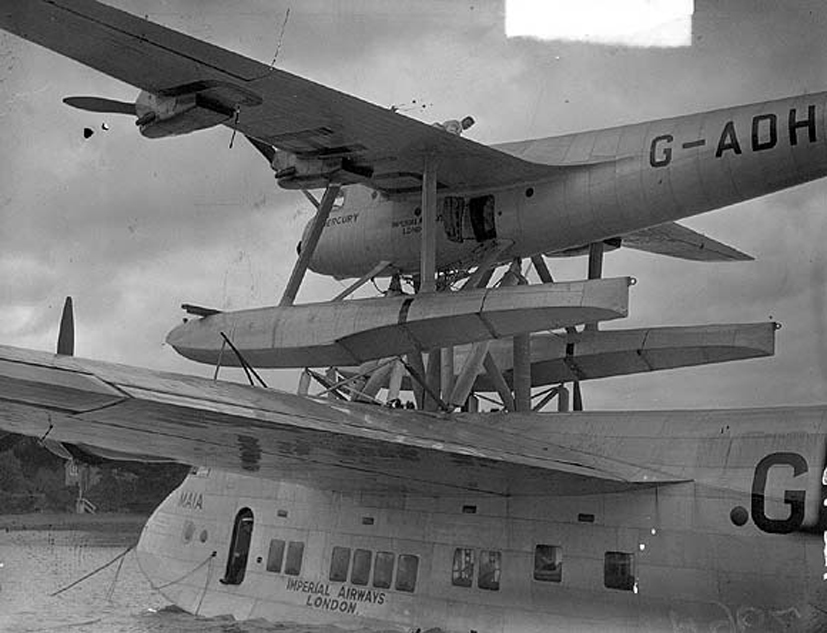
The aircraft in Ireland, 20 July 1938, the day before the first trans-Atlantic flight

The first successful in-flight separation was carried out from the Shorts works at Borstal, near Rochester, Medway, on 6 February 1938, Maia piloted by Parker and Mercury by Harold Piper.

Following further successful tests, the first transatlantic flight was made on 21 July 1938 from Foynes, on the Shannon Estuary, west coast of Ireland, to Boucherville, near Montreal, Quebec, Canada, a flight of 2,930 miles (4,720 km). Maia, flown by Captain A.S. Wilcockson, took off from Southampton carrying Mercury piloted by Captain Don Bennett. (Note: Captain Bennett was later the first commander of the RAF Pathfinder Force in WWII and became an Air Vice Marshal) Just prior to launching Mercury, the launch aircraft Maia carried 10 passengers and luggage from Southampton, England, to Foynes, Ireland. Mercury separated from her carrier at 8 pm to continue what was to become the first commercial (Note: The British flying boats Caledonia and Cambria had already made several non-stop survey flights of the Atlantic route.) non-stop East-to-West transatlantic flight by a heavier-than-air machine. This initial journey took 20 h 21 min at an average ground speed of 144 miles per hour (232 km/h).

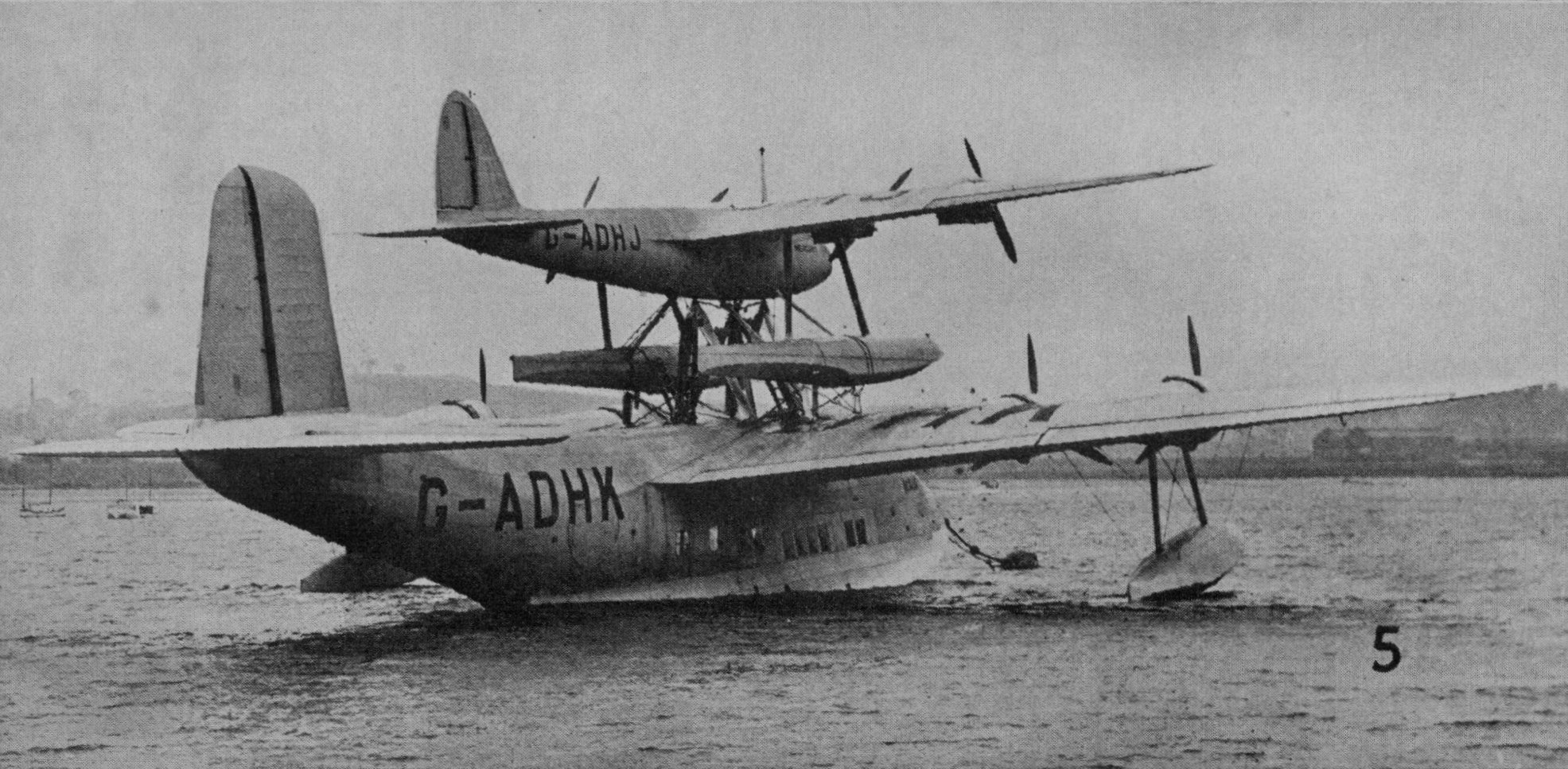
The Maia-Mercury composite circa August 1938

The Maia-Mercury composite continued in use with Imperial Airways, including Mercury flying to Alexandria, Egypt, in December 1938. After modifications to extend Mercury's range, it established a record flight for a seaplane of 6,045 miles (9,728 km) from Dundee in Scotland to Alexander Bay, in South Africa between 6 and 8 October 1938.

Only one example of the Short-Mayo composite was built, the S.21 Maia with the registration G-ADHK and the S.20 Mercury G-ADHJ. The development of a more powerful and longer-range Empire boat (the Short S.26), the increase in allowable all-up weights with the standard "C-Class", the further development of in-flight refuelling and the outbreak of the Second World War combined to render the approach obsolete. Maia was destroyed in Poole Harbour by German bombers on 11 May 1941. Mercury was flown to Felixstowe for use by 320 (Netherlands) Squadron RAF, a unit of the Royal Air Force formed from the personnel of the Royal Netherlands Naval Air Service. This squadron was based at the time at RAF Pembroke Dock. When this squadron was re-equipped with Lockheed Hudsons, Mercury was returned to Shorts at Rochester on 9 August 1941 and broken up so that its aluminium could be recycled for use in the war effort.

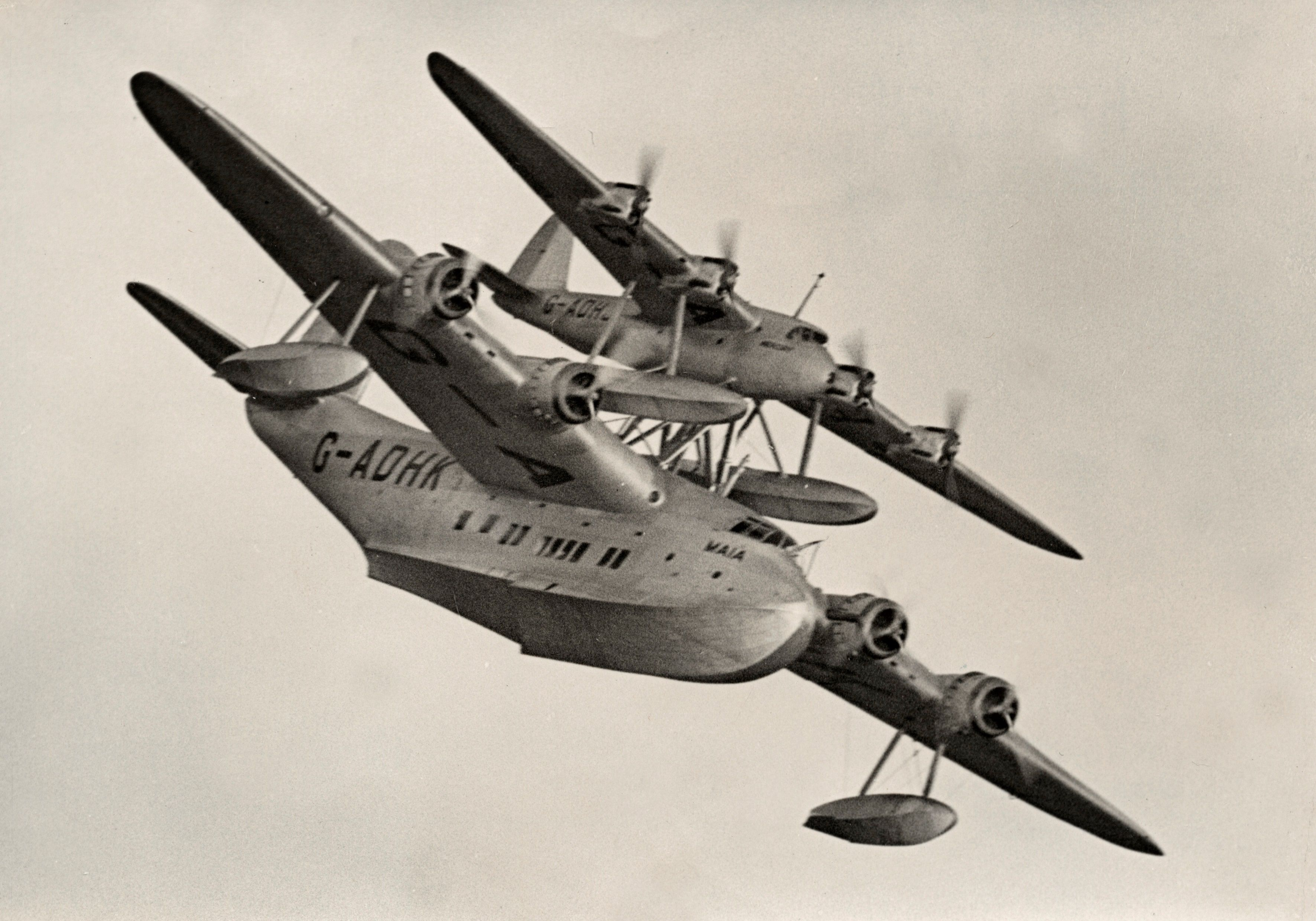
The pair in flight.

== Legacy ==
On the Tay Embankment close to the RRS Discovery there is a bronze plaque attached to the seawall. This commemorates the world record long-distance seaplane flight, at a location where the estuary and hills behind the take-off waters are seen. The plaque shows in raised relief the two aircraft still joined but reaching the altitude at which they would have separated. The plaque also contains wording including: - ″Commemoration of the 1938 flight of Captain Bennett from the Tay Estuary to South West Africa... The world record long-distance flight by a seaplane was achieved by the aircraft "Mercury", the upper component of the Short Mayo... The two experimental planes ...were built by Short Brothers for Imperial Airways and designed to carry mail long distances without refueling... This tribute to the epic flight by Captain D.C.T. Bennett and First Officer Ian Harvey was unveiled by Captain Bennett's wife Mrs Ly Bennett and Lord Provost Mervyn Rollo on 4 October 1997.″

The concept also had an unusual legacy, since in 1976 NASA needed to transport the Space Shuttle between the Kennedy Space Center and Edwards Air Force Base between each mission, and to get the craft airborne for gliding tests. Jim McLaughlin, Chief Weights Engineer for Boeing 747 program, who was assisting NASA with the SCA Program, was previously the Chief Weights Engineer for Short Brothers and had been involved in the development of the Mayo Composite design at Shorts, and reminded a NASA engineer of the concept which enabled NASA to modify a second-hand Boeing 747 as the carrier aircraft accordingly.

== Operators ==
United Kingdom

- Imperial Airways
- Royal Air Force
  - No. 320 Squadron RAF

== Specifications (S.20 Mercury) ==
Data from

General characteristics

- Crew: 2 (pilot and navigator/radio operator)
- Capacity: 1,000 lb (450 kg) of mail
- Length: 51 ft 0 in (15.54 m)
- Wingspan: 73 ft 0 in (22.25 m)
- Height: 20 ft 3 in (6.17 m)
- Wing area: 611 sq ft (56.8 m^{2})
- Empty weight: 10,163 lb (4,610 kg)
- Gross weight: 15,500 lb (7,031 kg) (solo - i.e. non-composite take-off)
- Composite launch weight:
  - 20,800 lb (9,430 kg) (Normal composite launch weight)
  - 26,800 lb (12,160 kg) (Record composite launch weight - Cape flight)
- Powerplant: 4 × Napier Rapier VI 16-cylinder "H-block" piston engines, 365 hp (272 kW) each

Performance

- Maximum speed: 212 mph (341 km/h, 184 kn)
- Cruise speed: 195 mph (314 km/h, 169 kn)
- Range: 3,900 mi (6,300 km, 3,400 nmi) * Extended range: 6,100 mi (5,300 nmi; 9,820 km) (Cape flight)
- Wing loading: 33.6 lb/sq ft (164 kg/m^{2})

== Specifications (S.21 Maia) ==
Data from

General characteristics

- Crew: 3
- Capacity: 18 passengers
- Length: 84 ft 11 in (25.88 m)
- Wingspan: 114 ft 0 in (34.75 m)
- Height: 32 ft 7 1/2 in (9.944 m)
- Wing area: 1,750 sq ft (163 m^{2})
- Empty weight: 24,745 lb (11,224 kg)
- Gross weight: 27,700 lb (12,565 kg) (limit on weight of Maia for composite launching)
- Max takeoff weight: 38,000 lb (17,237 kg)
- Powerplant: 4 × Bristol Pegasus XC nine-cylinder radial engines, 919 hp (685 kW) each

Performance

- Maximum speed: 200 mph (320 km/h, 170 kn)
- Range: 850 mi (1,370 km, 740 nmi)
- Service ceiling: 20,000 ft (6,100 m)

== See also ==
Related development

- Short Empire
- Short S.26

Aircraft of comparable role, configuration, and era

- Felixstowe Porte Baby

Related lists

- List of flying boats and floatplanes
- List of aircraft of the Royal Air Force

== Notes ==
Notes

Citations
