= Alfred David Augustus d'Espinassy de Fontanelle =

Anglo-French military officer and nobleman

Knight, Marquis and Major Alfred David Augustus d'Espinassy de Fontanelle
- Born: Alfred David Augustus d'Espinassy de Fontanelle; April 28, 1827; England
- Died: January 1882; France
- Other name: David
- Spouse: Lady Lucy Stuart
- Military career
- Allegiance: England, France
- Branch: French Army
- Rank: Major
- Unit: 1st Grenadier Regiment of the Imperial Guard
- Commands: Rambouillet
- Awards: Knight Cross of the Legion of Honor

Alfred David Augustus d'Espinassy de Fontanelle (28 April 1827 – January 1882) was an Anglo-French military officer and nobleman.

== Family ==
Alfred David Augustus D'Espinassy de Fontanelle was born in England to Blaire Marius d'Espinassy de Fontanelle who was the 4th Marquis of Fontanelle, and his mother the Lady Maria Capell who was a granddaughter of the 4th Earl of Essex. His parents met at the famous ball held in Brussels the night before the Battle of Waterloo.

His paternal grandfather was Antoine Joseph Marie d'Espinassy who was a member of the council that decided the fate of Louis XVI of France in his trial after the French Revolution. His maternal grandfather was John Thomas Capell, half-brother of George Capel-Coningsby, 5th Earl of Essex.

On 27 April 1881, at Kiltoom church in County Roscommon, Ireland, D'Espinassy de Fontanelle married Lucy Stuart, daughter of Capt. Thomas Stuart and Lucy Bland, of Combermere, Glanmire, County Cork. Lucy was a great-niece of the Indophile Charles "Hindoo" Stuart".

== Military service ==
D'Espinassy de Fontanelle entered the French Army and joined the Foreign Legion, taking part in the Crimean War. In the Siege of Sevastopol he was shielded by one of his men from a cannonball; later in the fight he was severely wounded and his left arm was amputated as a result. His noted gallantry led to his promotion to the rank of Captain, as well as his decoration of Knight Cross of the Order of the Legion of Honor.

While recovering from the effects of the amputation he spent some time on board HMS Princess Royal, commanded by his cousin, Lord Clarence Paget. On his return to France he was appointed Major of the 1st Grenadier Regiment of the French Imperial Guard. At the close of the war in Italy he received honorable mention, retired from the army and he was appointed sous-préfet of Rambouillet, where he was stationed at the start of the Franco-Prussian War of 1870.

He was captured while defending Rambouillet and sent to the fortress of Ehrenbreitstein in Germany, where he was imprisoned. After three months, he obtained parole and for the remainder of his captivity made friends among the military authorities of the fortress. He was released at the end of the war and returned to France, but his health had been badly affected by his imprisonment and he retired from public life.

== Marquisate of Fontanelle ==
The Marquisate of Fontanelle passed to his sister Caroline Hélène Hortense Agathe d'Espinassy de Fontanelle who was the wife of Claude Joseph Ernest the Count of Narcillac du Chastil de Andelot and a proveable direct descendant of the King of France, Louis IX.
