= Aubrey Koch =

Australian RAF officer

Albert Aubrey Koch
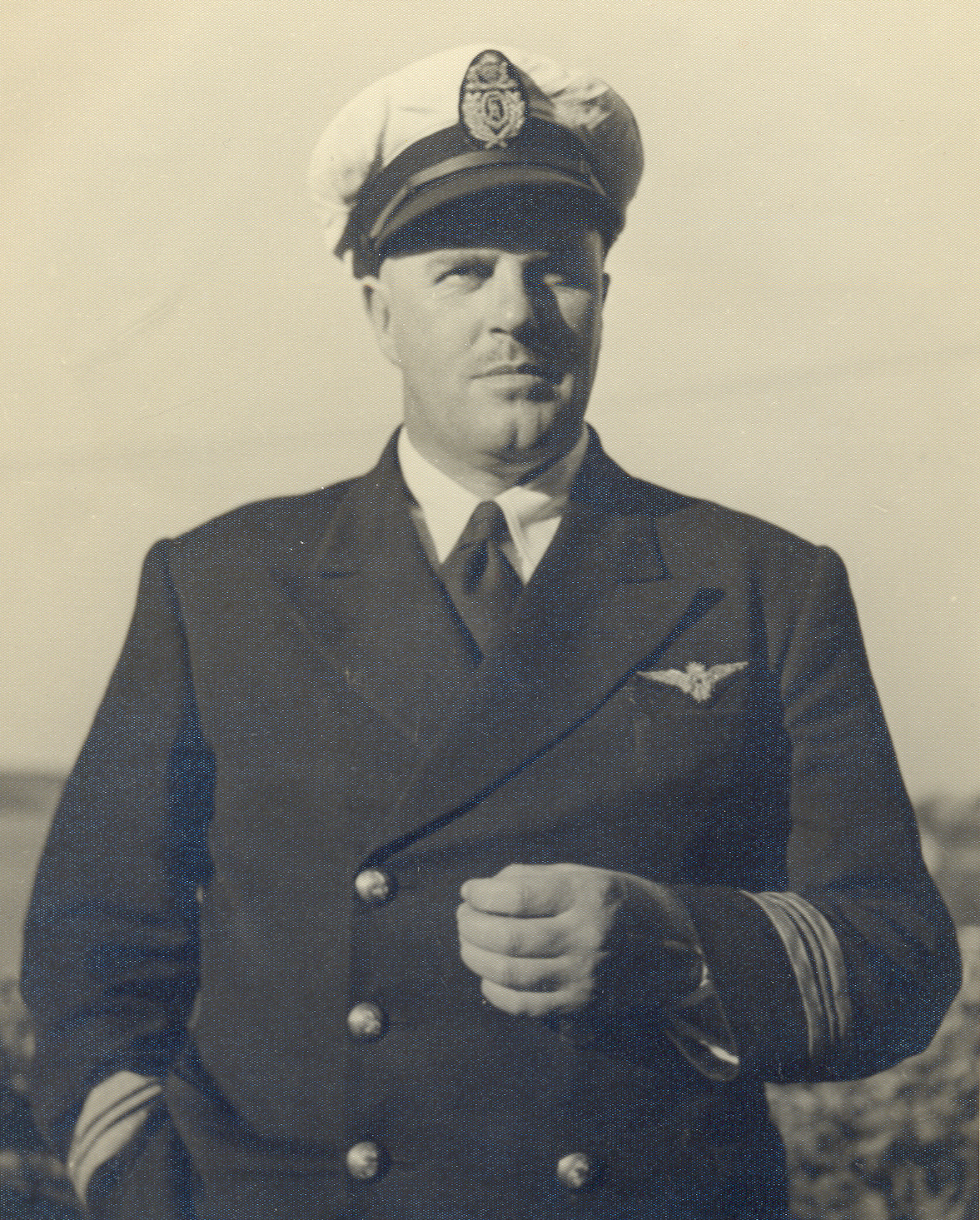
- Captain Koch in Qantas uniform
- Born: 2 October 1904; Ulverstone, Tasmania
- Died: 21 June 1975 (aged 70); Mount Eliza, Victoria
- Years active: 1926–1945
- Known for: Relief of Archbold Expedition; Shot down in Qantas aircraft Trans Australia Airlines executive
- Awards: Member of the Order of the British Empire
- Aviation career
- Air force: Royal Air Force (1927–30); Royal Australian Air Force (1931–45)
- Battles: Inter-war: Egypt and Palestine; World War II: South West Pacific theatre
- Rank: Flight Lieutenant

Albert Aubrey (Aub) Koch, MBE (2 October 1904 – 21 June 1975) was a pioneering Australian military and civil pilot. He trained at Point Cook in 1926, and following graduation accepted a Short Service Commission in the Royal Air Force (RAF) as there were no places available in the Royal Australian Air Force (RAAF) at the time. After four years service in Egypt and Palestine, he returned to Australia and was commissioned into the Citizen Air Force, flying with No. 1 Squadron at Laverton, where he gained flying instructor qualifications. Soon afterwards, he was employed by Guinea Airways as an aircraft captain, and spent five years in Papua and New Guinea (PNG), gaining fame as the rescuer of the Archbold expedition. Koch was transferred to the RAAF Active Reserve upon going to PNG. He joined Qantas a year before World War II broke out, employed predominantly on the Singapore route. He was unfortunate to be the captain of the only Qantas aircraft known to be shot down during that war, when the Short Empire flying boat Corio was lost off Timor (Circe disappeared in 1942, possibly also shot down, and Corinna was destroyed by enemy action on the water at Broome, Western Australia). Post war he was recruited by Lester Brain at the formation of Trans Australia Airlines (TAA), specifically to be Senior Pilot DC4 Skymaster. At 45, he retired from active flying to become Inspector of Safety and Accidents, TAA.

== Early career ==
Aubrey Koch was born at Ulverstone, Tasmania on 2 October 1904, the son of R. W. Koch, later the Building Surveyor of Hobart, and Elinor (Burton) Koch. He was educated at Clemes College, Hobart, and began an Engineering Degree at the University of Tasmania. He was a keen rower, and was in the bow for the 1925 winning crew in the inter-varsity eights in Brisbane. Aviation called, however, and he entered RAAF Point Cook for pilot training in 1926, graduating at the end of the year. He was one of six graduates from his course selected for a Short Service Commission in the RAF.

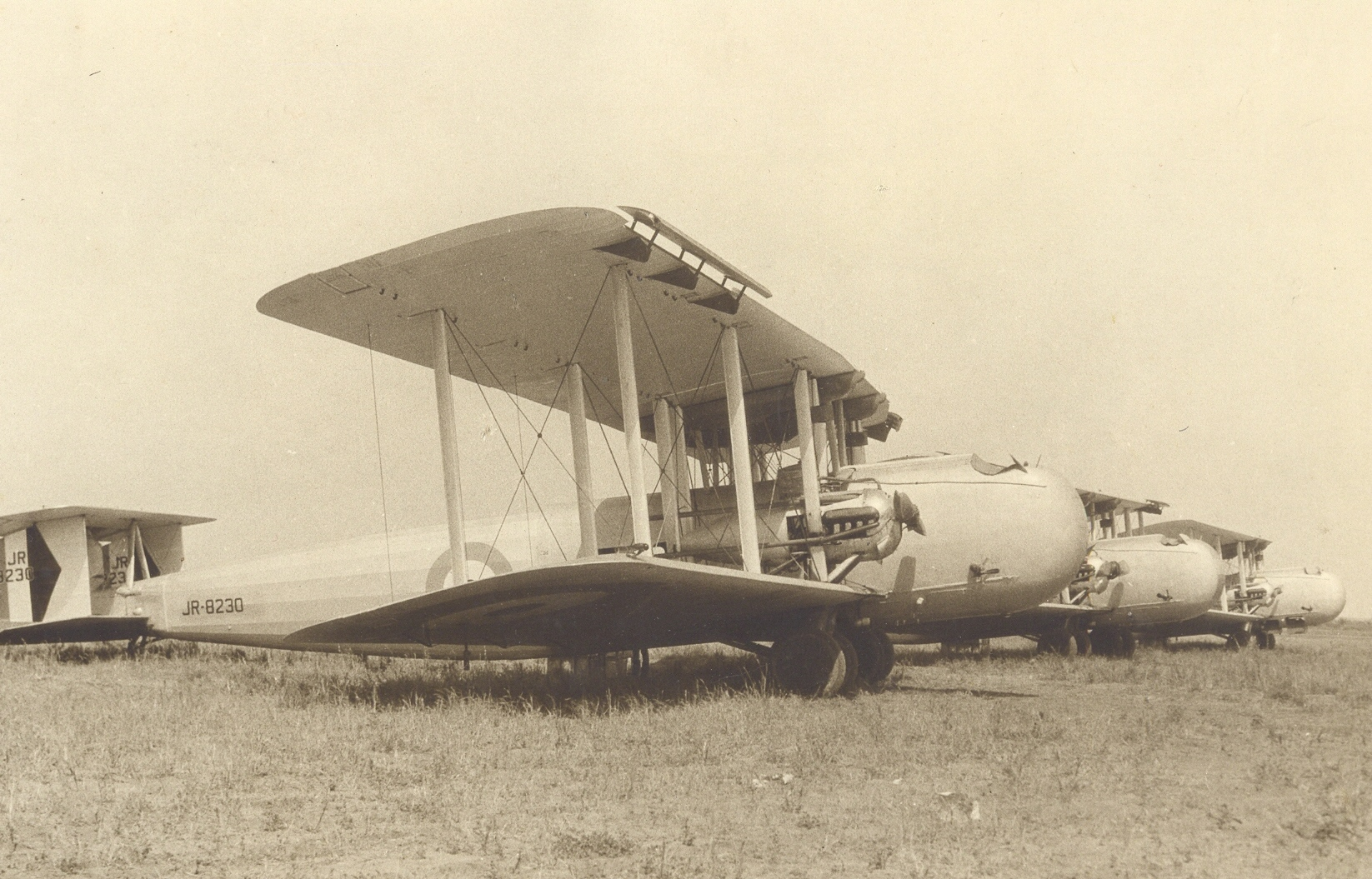
No. 216 Squadron RAF Vickers Victorias at Ismailia (A. A. Koch)

Koch was initially sent to England for training and assessment, where he flew the Avro 504, the Armstrong Whitworth Siskin, and the Bristol Fighter. He then accepted a posting to the Middle East, and was attached to No. 208 Army Cooperation Squadron, RAF, at Heliopolis, Egypt. There he was operational on the Bristol Fighter, and in August and September 1929 was involved in the suppression of the Hebron riots. Whilst on leave in Australia in 1929, Koch met with Lieutenant Colonel Horace Brinsmead, Controller of Civil Aviation, who advised him to gain experience on larger aircraft. However, his application for posting to a twin-engine squadron was refused. In May 1930, the Squadron re-equipped with Armstrong Whitworth Atlas. Koch was also allowed to convert to the Vickers Vimy at No. 216 Squadron, and flew as second pilot on Vickers Victoria aircraft. He returned to Australia at the end of 1930, arriving in Melbourne on 15 December. In Egypt, Koch had continued his interest in rifle shooting and photography.

Employment in public transport aviation was difficult to find in 1931, but Koch was able to continue flying with the Citizen Air Force at No. 1 Squadron, Laverton. He flew as second pilot without pay for Australian National Airways in 1931, to gain experience, and was lucky not to be aboard the ill-fated Southern Cloud, when family commitments prevented him taking his position. In mid-1933 he was appointed instructor with the Australian Aero Club, based at Essendon Aerodrome. In November 1933, he was recruited by Guinea Airways as an aircraft captain, and was to spend the next five years in Papua and New Guinea. He flew the Junkers W 34, the Junkers G 31, and the Ford Tri-Motor during this time, gaining much experience with sea operations when the W34 was float equipped. He gained some fame from his efforts to deliver supplies to the second (1936–37) Archbold Expedition. The expedition had become isolated when its own aircraft was accidentally destroyed in Port Moresby harbour, and was thought to be camped in the Blucher Mountains near the headwaters of the Strickland River, low on supplies and without fuel for its generators. Koch, operating out of Mt Hagen in a Ford fitted with long range tanks, found the party and resupplied it by parachute with food and gasoline. Among his many photographs taken during this period are several of the last known days of Amelia Earhart at Lae aerodrome. He married Clarice Grant on 1 June 1933, in Melbourne; the couple were to have a daughter and two sons.

== World War II ==
Koch finally achieved his ambition of joining what was then known as Qantas Empire Airways (QEA) with an appointment on 4 July 1938. The Singapore service commenced on 2 August 1938 (the westbound service was "officially" opened on 4 August). In the arcane language of QEA, he was promoted from "Extra Mate" to "Senior Mate" in October 1940. This allowed him to fly as relief Captain on the Singapore service. He was soon promoted to "Master", and in June 1943 to "Extra Master". QEA was intimately involved in the war effort almost from its beginning, and in late 1940 was contracted to fly 19 PBY5 Catalinas from Honolulu to Australia on behalf of the RAAF. By a convenience, the crews were regarded as civilians (to meet American diplomatic niceties) for this operation, but on other RAAF contracts, particularly to combat zones, they were seen as serving in the RAAF Reserve. Brain, Koch and P.G. Taylor flew the final delivery flight of the Catalina ferry, arriving in Sydney on 24 October 1941, for the first time via Suva, Fiji. This crew determined to commemorate their mission by flying the first airmail delivery between Fiji and Australia, and to that end they had a large number of "First Day Covers" (but without Airmail stamps) endorsed by the Suva Post Office prior to departure, and by the Sydney Post Office on arrival (some examples of what became collector's items are held by the Qantas Founders Museum). They also transported 200 pounds weight of ordinary mail on behalf of the Fiji postal authorities. This plan led to a serious contretemps with Pan American, which had the contract to convey the air mail from Fiji but was not due to start operations until 9 November 1941.

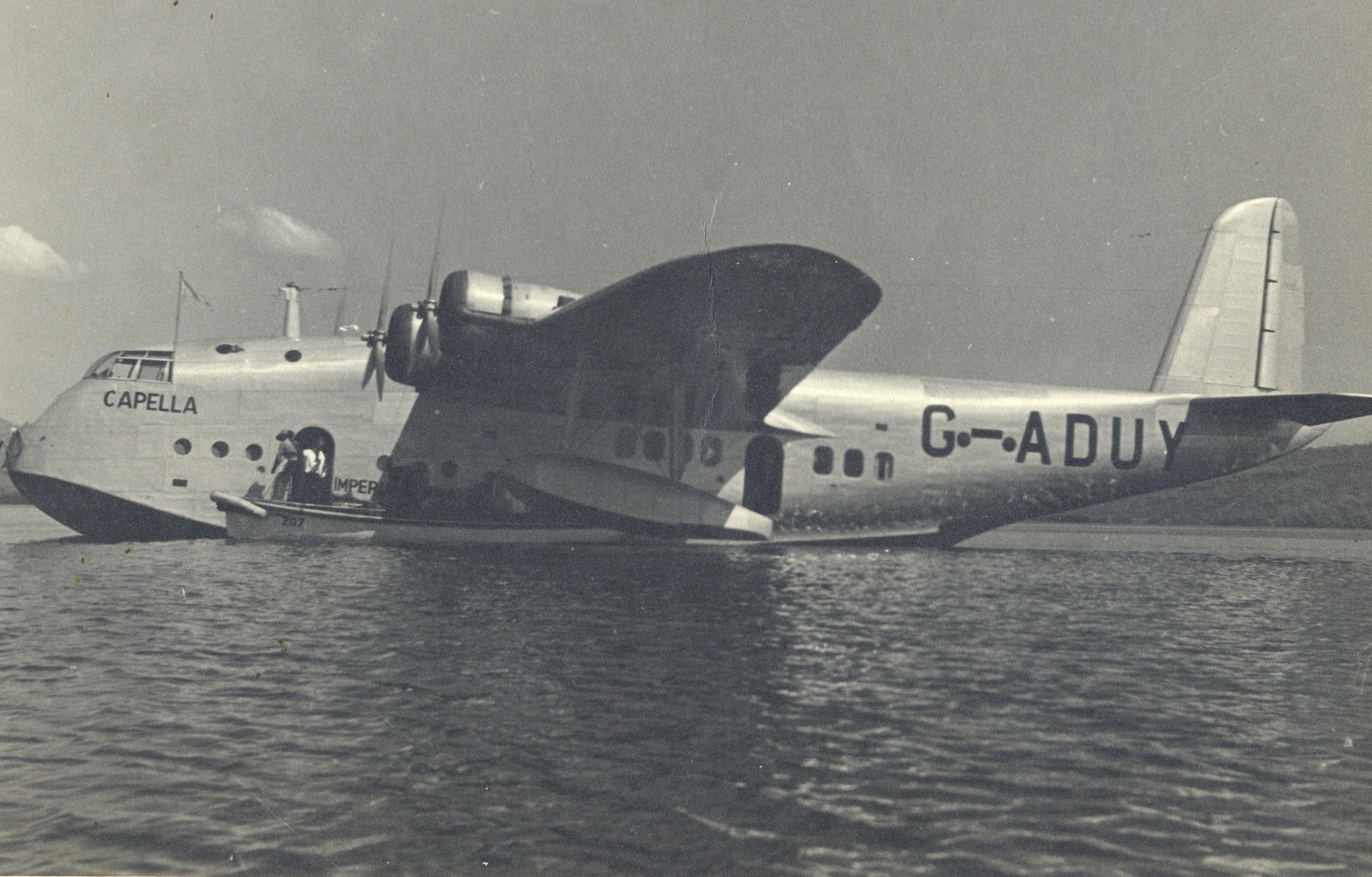
Imperial Airways Short Empire Capella c. 1940 (A. A. Koch)

Koch returned to the East Indies operation, and on 30 January 1942, when in command of Corio, he was shot down off Timor by seven Japanese Zeros whilst carrying out a relief flight to Surabaya, Dutch East Indies. Of the eighteen people on board, five survived. Koch was wounded by gunfire in the left leg and left arm, and broke his right leg in the subsequent crash landing. Despite the injuries, he swam about five miles to the shore where he was looked after by local people, until the Dutch Navy found the survivors some days later, and rescued them with a Dornier flying boat. Some three weeks later, he was in Darwin hospital on the day of the first Japanese raid on Darwin. By good fortune, the QEA flying boat Camilla survived the raid, and Koch was flown to Sydney for treatment.

He was unfortunate again on 22 April 1943 when, in command of Camilla on an RAAF contract involving the transport of military personnel to Port Moresby, he found himself unable to proceed due to bad weather, and was forced to attempt a night landing on the open ocean when off the coast of New Guinea. Due largely to the inexperience of his co-pilot, the aircraft broke up on landing, and 13 out of the 31 people on board did not survive. Koch spent about 18 hours in the sea before being rescued at the chance passage of a local steamer. A. B. Corbett, the Director-General of Civil Aviation, recommended to his Minister that in view of the circumstances no Court of Inquiry be held—in effect Koch was exonerated.

== Post-war career ==
In 1946, the Australian Government determined to nationalise commercial air operations in the belief that air transport was primarily a public service, but was prevented from doing so by a High Court decision. It therefore formed a government airline to compete with the private carriers, which was to be administered by the Australian National Airways Commission, and would operate as Trans Australia Airlines (TAA). Lester Brain was headhunted from Qantas and was appointed General Manager of the new airline. One of his first appointments was that of Captain Aubrey Koch to be Senior Pilot DC4 Skymaster. Koch remained in this role for four years, retiring from active flying in September 1950 with in excess of 17,000 flying hours, due to disabilities developed from his war injuries, and taking up the role of Inspector of Air Safety. In June 1955 he was appointed a Member of the Civil Division of the Most Excellent Order of the British Empire, the citation being: "In recognition of Captain Koch's long and distinguished service to civil aviation in Australia." He finally retired in June 1961, and settled at Mt Eliza, Victoria, where he died on 21 June 1975.
