= 1942 Qantas Short Empire shootdown =

1942 aviation accident

Coordinates: 5°S 120°E

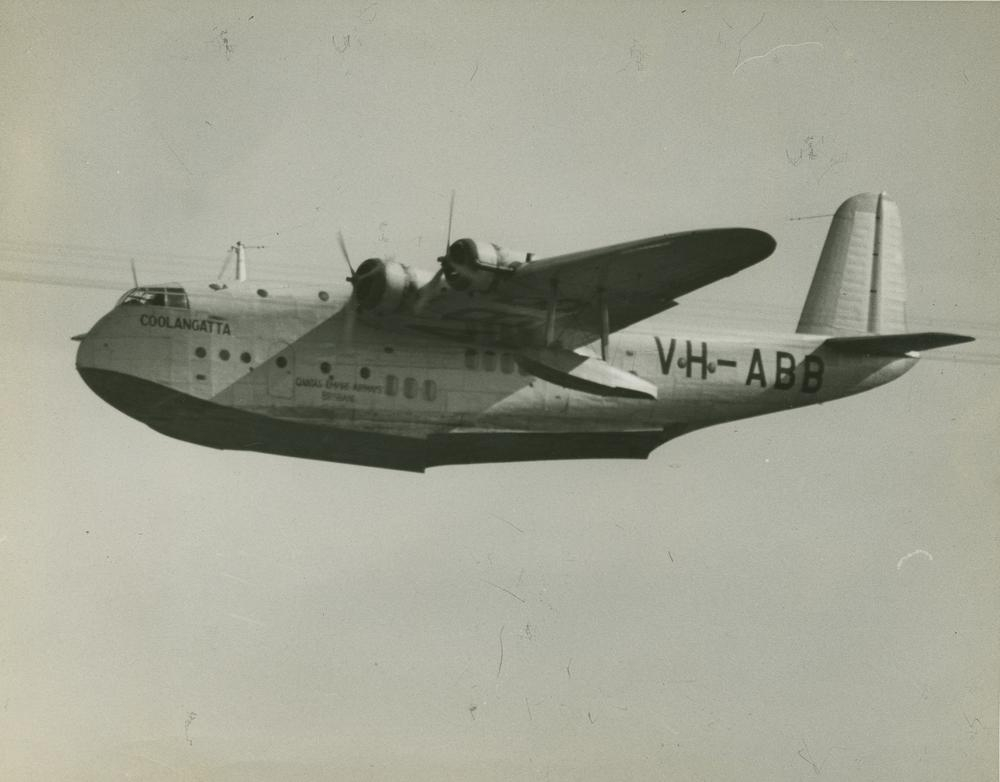
- VH-ABB, a Qantas Short Empire similar to the aircraft involved

Accident
- Date: 30 January 1942
- Summary: Shootdown
- Site: West Timor, Dutch East Indies

Aircraft
- Aircraft type: Short Empire S.23
- Operator: Qantas
- Registration: G-AEUH
- Flight origin: El Tari International Airport
- Destination: Darwin International Airport
- Occupants: 18
- Passengers: 14
- Crew: 4
- Fatalities: 13
- Survivors: 5

The 1942 Qantas Short Empire shoot-down occurred in the early days of the Pacific War during World War II. Corio, a Short Empire flying boat airliner operated by Qantas, was shot down by Japanese aircraft off the coast of West Timor, Dutch East Indies, on 30 January 1942, killing 13 of the occupants.

== Aircraft history ==
Corio

General information
- Type: Short Empire S.23
- Manufacturer: Short Brothers
- Owners: Qantas; Imperial Airways
- Registration: G-AEUH

History
- In service: 1938–1942
- Fate: Shot down 30 January 1942

Corio, named after Corio, Victoria, was built as an S.23 Empire by Short Brothers and entered service with Qantas in October 1938 registered as VH-ABD then was sold to Imperial Airways in September 1939. The airliner, after being re-registered in the UK as G-AEUH, was then leased back to Qantas.

== Air attack ==
On 30 January 1942, G-AEUH, captained by A. A. (Aub) Koch, left Darwin at dawn, for Kupang, West Timor, en route to Surabaya, where it was to pick up refugees from the Japanese invasion of Java and transport them to Australia. When it was 13 nmi (24 km; 15 mi) from West Timor, travelling at a height of 400 ft (120 m), Corio was fired on by seven Mitsubishi A6M Zero fighters.

Koch dived for the coast, attempting to evade the attack and the aircraft reached its maximum speed, possibly 200 mph (320 km/h). Koch flew a zig-zag, so low that the wing floats bounced off the sea. The Zero pilots soon achieved several hits, perforating the fuselage and killing some passengers. Two engines caught fire and Corio hit the sea at high speed, nose first, 3 nmi (5.6 km; 3.5 mi) from the mouth of the Noelmini River; the impact breaking the fuselage in two.

Of the 18 passengers and crew, 13 were killed in the attack. Koch, wounded in an arm and leg, was thrown out of the wreckage by the impact. He managed to swim ashore, taking three hours. Koch, three passengers and two crew were rescued by a Dornier Do 24 flying boat of the Royal Netherlands Navy.

Koch later survived another attack by Japanese aircraft, and the crash of another Empire flying boat. On 19 February 1942, while he was recuperating in Darwin Hospital, the Bombing of Darwin took place. On 22 April 1943, Koch was piloting Camilla, another Qantas Short Empire, on a flight from Australia to New Guinea, when it crashed in the sea off Port Moresby in bad weather.

== See also ==
- List of Qantas fatal accidents
- 1942 KNILM Douglas DC-3 shootdown
