= Alan Aubry =

French photographer (born 1974)

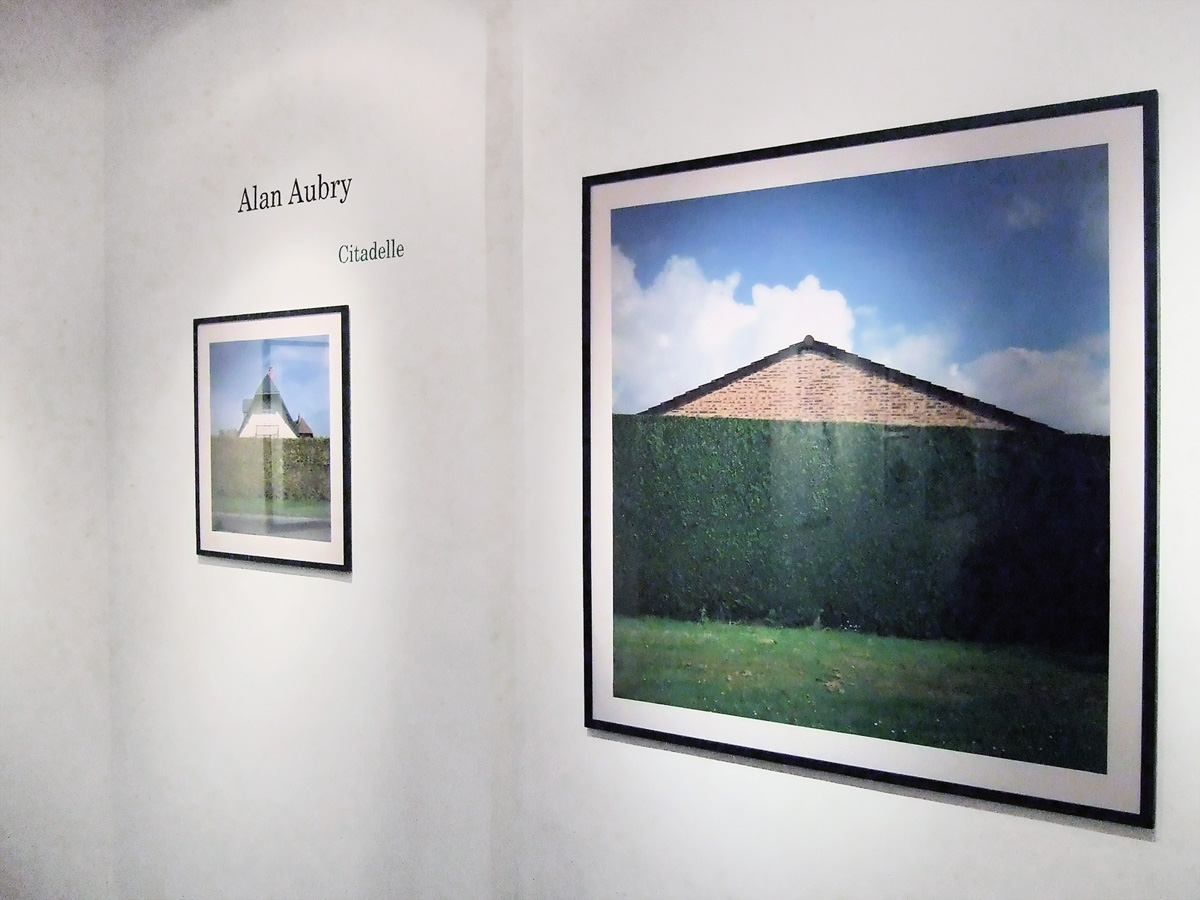
Citadelle, "Citadelle"exhibition at Gallery Boumier, Versailles, France)

Alan Aubry (born 24 September 1974) is a French photographer. He graduated from the Art College of Rouen, France, in 1998.

== Exhibitions ==
- 2010 – Down Memory Lane. Maison d'arrêt des femmes. Rouen, France.
- 2010 – Biographies. Pôle image de Haute-Normandie. Rouen, France.
- 2008 – International Festival of Environmental Images – Off. Paris, France.
- 2007 – Habiter, Face A Face B. Stanislas Castle, Commercy, France.
- 2007 – Gala. Lied Discovery Children's Museum, Las Vegas, United States.
- 2006 – Ouverture. Gallery Le Tracteur, Paris, France.
- 2006 – Citadelle. Gallery Boumier, Versailles, France.
- 2006 – Relais.' Gallery du Bellay, Mont-Saint-Aignan, France.
- 2006 – Paris Photographique. Espace Beaurepaire, Paris, France.
- 2005 – Les Nouveaux Lieux de Solitude. Pôle image de Haute-Normandie. Rouen, France.
- 2005 – Citadelle. Gallery Plume. Le Mans, France.
- 2005 – Rencontres Internationales de la Photographie. HypeGallery. Arles, France.
- 2004 – Hypegallery. Palais de Tokyo, Paris, France.
- 2002 – Les Iconoclasses. Gallery Duchamp, Yvetot, France.

== Photographic series ==
- 2010 – Orania Afrikanertuiste. Portraits within a private town for Afrikaners only in South Africa.
- 2008 – Orania. Photos within a private town for Afrikaners only in South Africa.
- 2007 – Károlyháza. Photos within an old collective farm in Hungary.
- 2007 – Habiter. Face A Face B, Photos within the city of Commercy, France. Worked with Antoine Doyen.
- 2007 – Parcel(le)s. Photos within labor kitchen garden
- 2007 – Zone vie. Photos within the air base of Évreux, France.
- 2006 – La Corniche. Photos of residential pavilions under construction.
- 2006 – Affaires culturelles. Photos within the offices of the French Cultural Department
- 2005 – Citadelle. Photos of residential pavilions dig in behind a hedge of thuyas
- 2005 – Rencontres. Photos of "risqué" meeting places around Rouen
- 2005 – Habitat provisoire. Photos of dormitories in a vacation centre
- 2005 – Desserte locale. Photographic inventory of all the panels indicating the entrance of the city of Rouen.
- 2005 – La Rafale
- 2005 – Abri-joueur. Photos of players' shelter on the border of playing fields.
- 2005 – 11 mètres. Photos of goals from the penalty point.
- 2004 – Retour vapeurs. Photos of petrol pumps.
- 2004 – Propriété de l'État. Photos of a precise type of phone boxes.
- 2004 – Voitures. Photos of abandoned cars, the time of a weekend, in the underground parking of a shopping center.
- 2004 – Abribus. Photos of a precise type of bus shelter.
- 2004 – Mesnil Roux. Photographie d'une zone délaissée d'un centre commercial.
- 2003 – Intérieurs familiers. Photos from domestic inside which marked his childhood.
