= Aubrey Robinson =

Aubrey Robinson may refer to:

- Aubrey Eugene Robinson Jr. (1922–2000), United States federal judge
- Aubrey Robinson (Hawaii planter) (1853–1936), Hawaiian island owner
