= Charles Aubry (jurist) =

French legal scholar and judge (1803–1883)

Charles Aubry (1803–1883) was a French jurist. He taught law at Strasbourg from 1833 to 1871 and was a judge on the Cour de Cassation from 1872 to 1878.

He was made famous in French legal circles by his only publication, together with Frédéric Charles Rau, the Cours de droit civil français (1839–46). This first systematic synthesis of French civil law abandoned the structure of the Code civil. It introduced, among others, German legal notions such as rules of evidence as well as theories of joint property and vindication to French law. Originally a translation of Karl-Salomon Zachariä's Handbuch des französischen Civilrechts, the work became increasingly independent from its German template, being republished as late as 1964–73 in an incomplete 7th edition.
