= Aubrey Williams (disambiguation) =

Aubrey Williams (1926–1990) was a Guyanese artist. Other people of the same name include:

- Aubrey Williams (British Army officer) (1888–1977)
- Aubrey Willis Williams (1890–1965), American activist
- Aubrey Williams (politician) (born 1945), American politician

== See also ==
- Gwilym Gwent (1834–1891), Welsh composer born William Aubrey Williams
