= Aubrey Kelly =

American football coach

Coaching career (HC unless noted)
- 1998–2001: Apprentice

Head coaching record
- Overall: 7–31

Aubrey Kelly is an American football coach. He was the 31st head football coach at The Apprentice School in Newport News, Virginia. He held that position for four seasons, from 1998 until 2001. His coaching record at Apprentice was 7–31.
