= Short Empire =

British Flying Boat of the 1930s

Empire
- The BOAC Short 'C' Class flying boat G-AFBL Cooee, at Rod El Farag, Egypt, c. 1946

General information
- Type: Flying boat mail and passenger carrier
- Manufacturer: Short Brothers
- Designer: Arthur Gouge
- Status: Retired
- Primary users: Imperial Airways/BOAC Qantas Empire Airways; Royal Australian Air Force; Royal Air Force
- Number built: 42

History
- Manufactured: 1936–1940
- Introduction date: Delivered 22 October 1936, First revenue flight 6 February 1937
- First flight: 3 July 1936
- Retired: 1946–47
- Variant: Short Mayo Composite

The Short Empire was a four-engined monoplane transport flying boat, designed and developed by Short Brothers during the 1930s to meet the requirements of the British Empire, specifically to provide air service from the UK to South Africa, Singapore and Australia in stages. It was developed in parallel with the Short Sunderland maritime patrol bomber, which served in the Second World War along with the piggy-back Short Mayo Composite.

Imperial Airways, as the primary customer, developed the requirements to which it was ordered and designed. Imperial Airways, and its successor, the British Overseas Airways Corporation (BOAC), along with Qantas and TEAL, operated the type in commercial service. The Empire routinely flew between the British mainland and Australia and the various British colonies in Africa and Asia, typically carrying a combination of passengers and mail. The Empires were also used between Bermuda and New York City.

The Empire saw commercial and military service during the Second World War, for anti-submarine patrols and as transport. The Royal Air Force (RAF), Royal Australian Air Force (RAAF), and Royal New Zealand Air Force (RNZAF) used the type.

== Development ==
=== Origins ===
During the 1930s, demand for air travel was rapidly growing. The British national flag airline Imperial Airways sought to fully expand air service across the British Empire. Imperial Airways' technical adviser, planned a specification for a new type of aircraft to serve passenger and freight requirements throughout the world. This required an aircraft to carry 24 passengers in comfort, as well as airmail or freight while having a cruising speed of 170 mph (270 km/h), a normal range of at least 700 mi (1,100 km) and the capability for an extended range of 2,000 mi (3,200 km) to cross the North Atlantic. At the time, and for various reasons, including technical and operational, it was determined that a flying boat would be required.

Short Brothers had previously developed successful large flying boats for Imperial Airways and the Royal Air Force (RAF), and was the frontrunner to fulfil the requirement. Shorts was reluctant to build straight from the drawing board without a prototype, however this was rejected by Imperial Airways, which was desperate to replace obsolete types then in service that were unable to provide the full service needed. In 1935, Imperial Airways announced an order for 28 flying boats of an as-of-yet undesigned type, weighing 18 tonnes each. The order was claimed by the British press as being "one of the world's boldest experiments in aviation".

A design team led by Arthur Gouge created the Empire. To have adequate clearance between the propellers and the water, the wing needed to be as high as feasible and was initially to be attached to a hump above the fuselage as on the Martin M-130, but the fuselage height was instead increased, providing more internal volume than required but enabling a lighter and stronger integration of the cantilever wing to the fuselage.

Following water tank experiments, a simplified-vee planing bottom with a much higher length to beam ratio than was common at the time was chosen. The aerodynamic and hydrodynamic properties were tested on the smaller Short Scion Senior floatplane, which served as a half-scale prototype for the Empire and its sibling, the military's Short Sunderland.

Shorts developed its own machinery to produce the necessary T-shaped Hiduminium alloy lengths that comprised the main spar. A specialised and patented flap, known as Gouge flaps after its creator, caused only a small increase in drag, while the wing's lift coefficient was increased by 30 percent, the landing speed reduced by 12 per cent, and no trim changes were needed.

=== Initial production ===
On 4 July 1936, the first Empire built, registered G-ADHL, named Canopus, made its first flight with Shorts' chief test pilot, John Lankester Parker at the controls. Early flights were relatively trouble-free, and Parker was satisfied with its performance and handling. On 17 September 1936, G-ADHL first flew for Imperial Airways, with the final proving flight to Marseille, France took place on 22 October 1936. The first series of the Short Empires, the S.23, could carry five crew, 17 passengers, and 4,480 lb (2,030 kg) of cargo at a maximum speed of 174 kn (322 km/h; 200 mph) and was powered by four 920 hp (690 kW) Bristol Pegasus Xc radial engines.

The second Empire and the first of the long-range models, registered G-ADHM, named Caledonia, made its first flight on 15 September 1936 and was delivered to Imperial Airways on 4 December 1936. From September 1936 onwards, one aircraft was produced per month and typically each aircraft's delivery occurring right after its first flight. The Empire was officially known as the C-class by Imperial Airways and each aircraft operated by them was given a name beginning with the letter C.

On 26 February 1938, the final three Empires of the initial order placed by Imperial Airways – Coorong, Coogee and Corio were diverted from Imperial Airways and delivered to the Anglo-Australian Qantas Empire Airways. In late 1937, Imperial Airways placed a follow-on order for another 11 Empires. When combined with the original order of 28, this had the distinction of being the largest order by a single customer placed for a British civil aircraft at that time. While the first three aircraft of the additional order were of the typical S.23 class, intended for Qantas Empire Airways, the rest had a number of detail changes and were designated the S.30. Short's Rochester factory produced all 43 Empires built.

=== Further development ===
The S.30 series was fitted with four Bristol Perseus XIIc sleeve valve engines in the place of the Pegasus engines. The 890 hp (660 kW) Perseus engines were each 85 lb (39 kg) lighter and 17.3% more fuel efficient, but developed less power. The airframe was strengthened, mainly by using heavier gauge sheeting on the fuselage and wings. The maximum takeoff weight increased to 46,000 lb (21,000 kg) with a corresponding range of 1,500 mi (2,400 km), the S.30 had a similar performance to the preceding S.23s.

The first of the S.30 flying boats was registered G-AFCT and named Champion. In December 1938, the second S.30 aircraft registered G-AFCU, named Cabot became the first of the revised series to fly. The last three aircraft of this order, initially named Captain Cook, Clare and Aotearoa, were renamed and re-registered for use by TEAL. In 1939, a final S.30 flying boat, registered G-AFKZ and named Cathay, was delivered to Imperial Airways in late March 1940.

Four flying S.30 series flying boats, Cabot, Caribou, Clyde and Connemara, were equipped with in-flight refuelling equipment and extra fuel tanks to provide scheduled transatlantic airmail service. The aircraft was to take off light and, once airborne, take on extra fuel to reach an all up weight of 53,000 lb (24,000 kg), giving the aircraft a range of over 2,500 mi (4,000 km). The extra fuel reduced payload to 4,270 lb (1,940 kg) against the 6,250 lb (2,830 kg) of the standard aeroplane. The refuelling was performed by three converted Handley Page Harrow bombers, one operating out of Ireland and two out of Newfoundland.

In 1939, Imperial Airways placed a further follow-on order for a modified S.30, designated the S.33. This series had the same construction as its predecessors, but the new Pegasus XI engine, a development of the powerplant used by the original S.23 series, was used. Out of these three final aircraft, only two, named Clifton and Cleopatra, would be completed and delivered to the newly renamed British Overseas Airways Corporation (BOAC).

The S.26, designated as the G-class by BOAC, was a substantially larger development of the Empire flying boat, and an entirely new aircraft, albeit of similar configuration. It was roughly 15 percent larger, as well as using the much more powerful Bristol Hercules radial engine and a further improved hull design. It was intended to be used on the north Atlantic route. The three that were built were immediately impressed into military service during the Second World War.

== Design ==
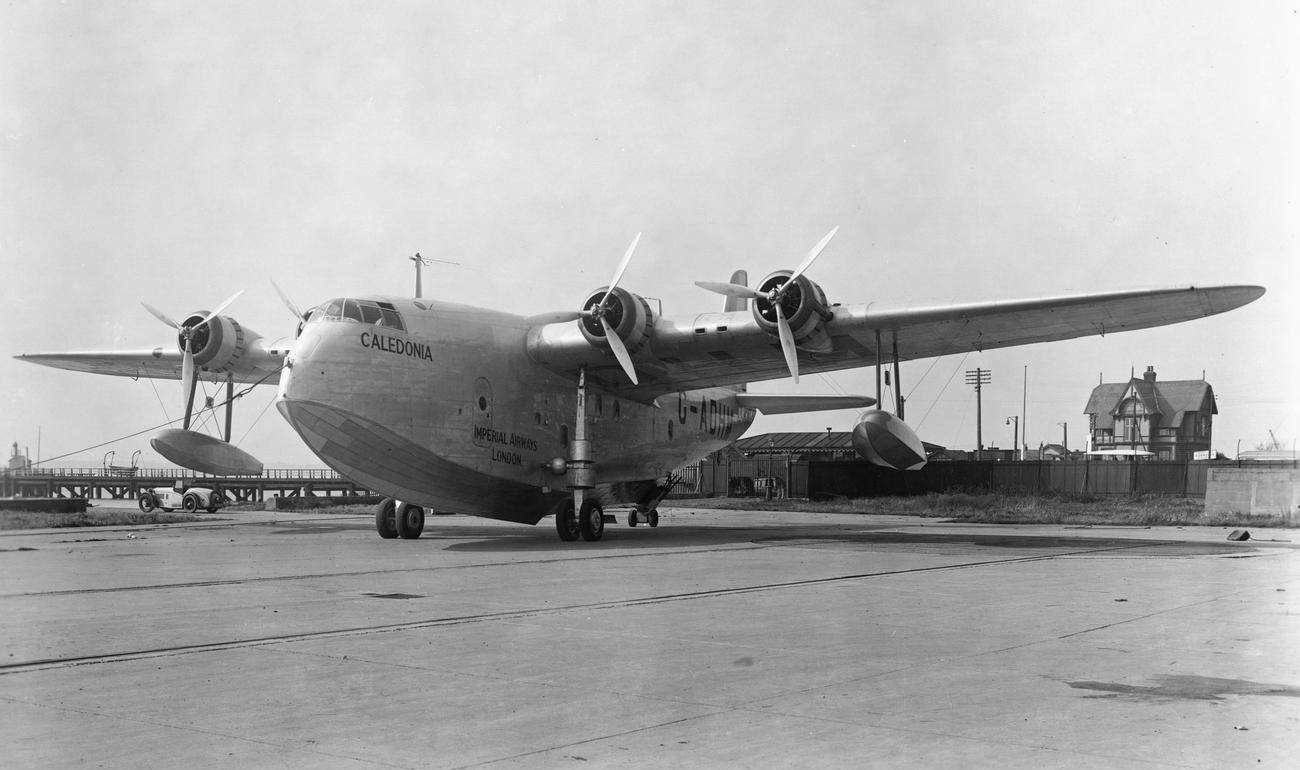
Short S.23 Empire G-ADHM, Caledonia, on its beaching gear at Felixstowe, Suffolk, England, September 1936

The Short Empire flying boat was a clean high-wing monoplane, initially powered by four wing-mounted Bristol Pegasus Xc radial engines which drove de Havilland-built variable-pitch propellers. The engines were each enclosed within NACA cowls and mounted ahead of the leading edge of the wings. This allowed portions of the leading edge adjacent to the engines to be hinged forward to be used as platforms to maintain the engines.

The Pegasus Xc engines each produced 910 hp (680 kW) on takeoff, decreasing to 740 hp (550 kW) at an altitude of 3,500 ft (1,100 m). Alternative engines were installed with both greater and reduced power outputs. Initial aircraft had a 40,500 lb (18,400 kg) gross weight, however, by 1939, many aircraft had been strengthened, for an increased gross weight of 53,000 lb (24,000 kg). Its useful load included 600 imp gal (2,700 L; 720 US gal) of fuel (weighing 4,560 lb (2,070 kg)), 44 imp gal (200 L; 53 US gal) of oil, assorted equipment (weighing 3,340 lb (1,510 kg)), along with the payload and five crew (weighing 8,200 lb (3,700 kg)). The S.23 series achieved a top speed of 200 mph (320 km/h) at an altitude of 5,500 ft (1,700 m) along with a cruising speed of 165 mph (266 km/h) and a minimum flying speed of 73 mph (117 km/h).

The wings had a flush-riveted Alclad covering with Frise-type ailerons and the internally-developed Gouge flaps, the latter of which were actuated by an electric motor connected via a gearing system and screw jacks, allowing the flaps to be lowered in 60 seconds and raised in 90 seconds. Large cylindrical 325-gallon fuel tanks were in the wings, between the inner and outer engines. On long-range variants of the aircraft, additional fuel tanks were added in the wings, up to three containing 280 gallons, 325 gallons, and 175 gallons in each wing. Sections of the wing leading edge alongside the nacelles folded down to be engine servicing platforms. Tip floats were carried on struts attached to the main spar and featured shock absorbers to reduce impact forces being transmitted to the wings.

The hull used the same steps as earlier designs, but had a much finer beam to length ratio, and employed Shorts' traditional construction methods. The structure used a combination of Z-shaped stringers and I-shaped girders to form triangular sections that ran along the chines where the fuselage sides meet the planing bottom. To simplify manufacturing and to maximize usable internal volume, only a simple single curvature on the hull was employed that didn't require the use of a press for most of the airframe. On previous Shorts' flying boats, a more complex S-shaped curvature and a sudden reduction in beam just above the chines had been employed instead.

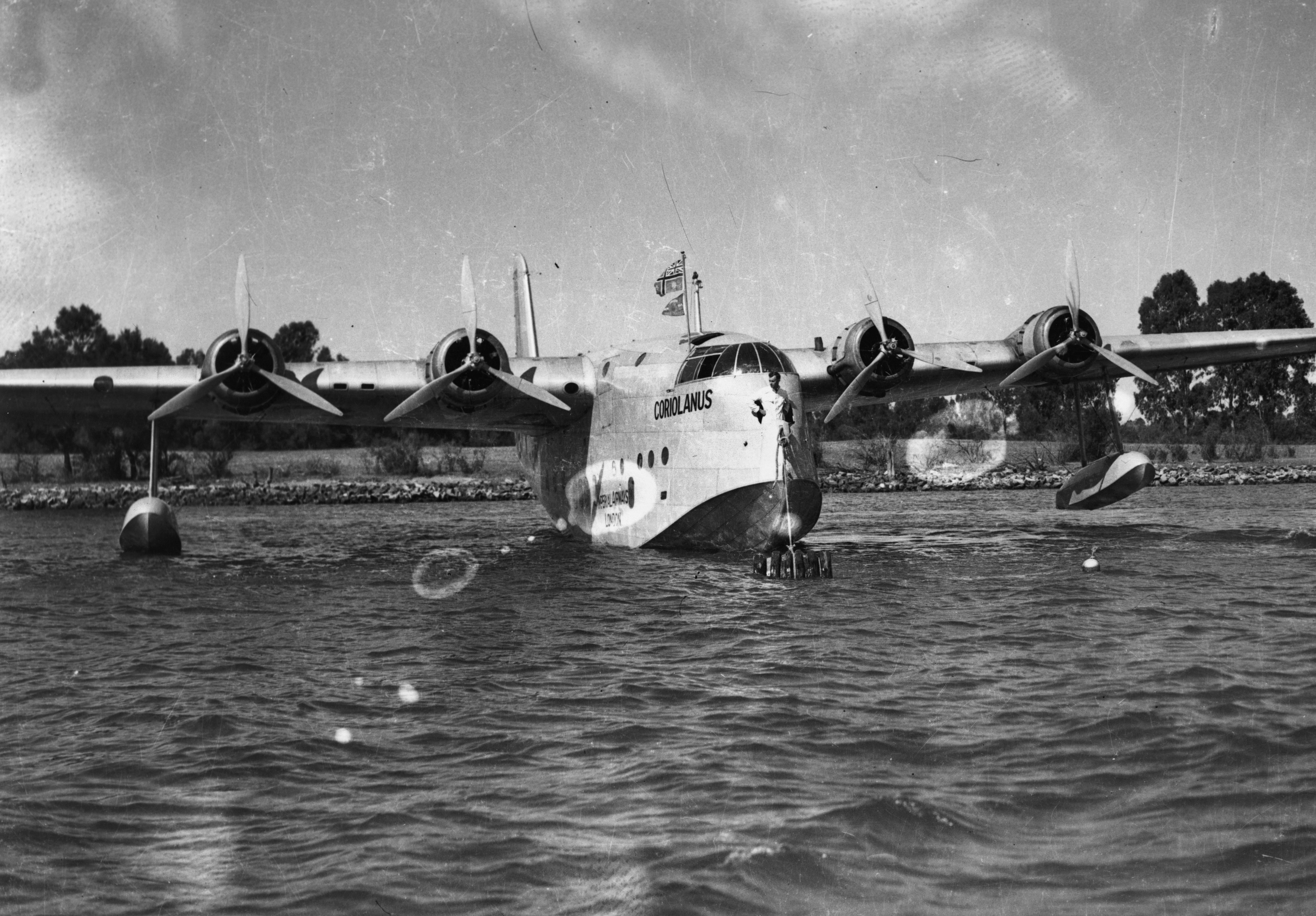
S.23 Empire G-AETV, named Coriolanus, moored at Pinkenba on the Brisbane River, 1939

The 17 ft (5.2 m) deep hull accommodated two decks, the upper deck forming a lengthy compartment divided into sections to accommodate 3,000 lb (1,400 kg) of freight and mail along with a storage space and a ship's clerk's office. This office contained controls such as electrical fuseboxes and circuit switches, ventilation controls, and fuelcocks. The lower deck contained a large marine compartment containing an anchor, a pair of drogues, a mooring bollard and a boat hook, along with a ladder to the cockpit. The forward passenger saloon was aft of the mooring compartment and was followed by a central corridor flanked by the toilets and galley, a mid-ship cabin, a spacious promenade cabin, and finally an aft-cabin, each stepped to a different height. The cabins could be fitted with seating or sleeper bunks. Near the rear of the aircraft, an additional freight and mail compartment extended into the rear fuselage.

The flying crew was seated in a spacious bridge with the captain and co-pilot seated side-by-side while the radio operator sat behind the captain, facing the rear. The flight deck was well equipped and included an autopilot while flying instrumentation included a Hughes turn indicator, compass, and variometer, a Sperry artificial horizon and heading indicator, a Kollsman sensitive altimeter, a Marconi radio direction finder, a Smiths chronometer, and an attitude indicator. The radio operator had Marconi shock-proof radio sets for transmitting and receiving while the retractable direction-finding loop antenna could be rotated for visual or aural homing.

While designed as civil aircraft, examples of the type would not only see military service but were specifically refitted for this purpose. In 1941, two Empire flying boats – Clio and Cordelia were modified at Shorts' Belfast facility with gun turrets in dorsal and tail positions, bomb racks extending out of slots cut in the fuselage sides as on the Sunderland, and air to surface vessel (ASV) radar equipment installed on the top and sides of the fuselage. They were used by Coastal Command. More extensive military use was made of the Empire's military counterpart, the Short Sunderland.

== Operational history ==
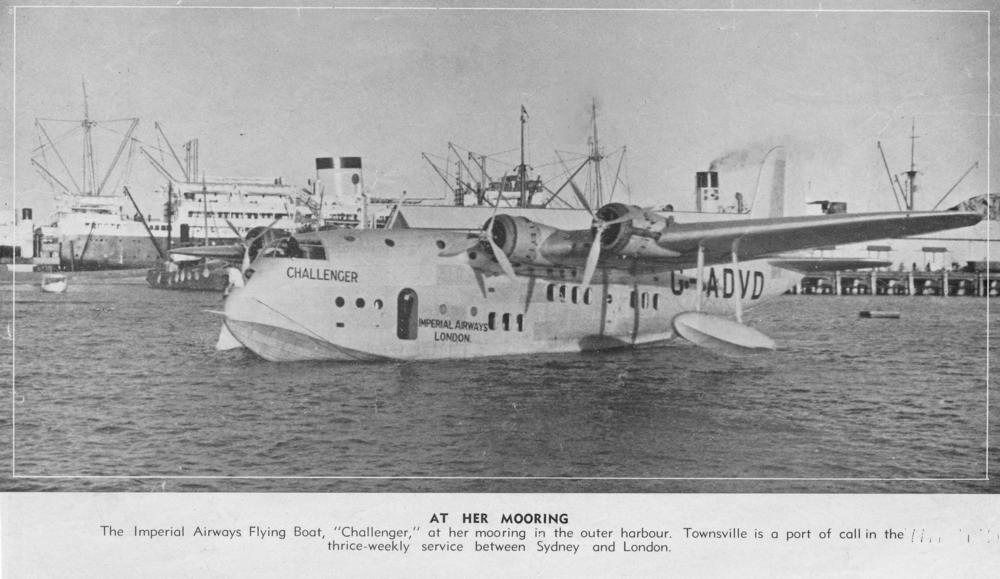
Empire flying boat, G-ADVD, named Challenger, at her moorings in the Townsville Harbour, Queensland, December 1938

On 8 February 1937, an Empire flying boat, Castor, completed the first scheduled flight, from Calshot, Hampshire, England to Alexandria, Egypt. This flight covered a distance of roughly 2,300 mi (3,700 km) non-stop. On 18 February 1937, Caledonia, the first of the Empires built, flew the same Calshot-Alexandria route; It was able to traverse the route non-stop at an average speed of 170 mph.

On 5 July 1937, the first crossing of the Atlantic by an Empire flying boat was conducted. On an experimental basis, Caledonia, piloted by Captain W N Cummings, flew a 1,993 mi (3,207 km) route from Foynes, Ireland west to Botwood, Newfoundland. On the same day, an American Sikorsky S-42 flying boat flew the opposite direction. Caledonia took just over 15 hours (including a period spend searching for a landing spot), flying at an altitude of 1,500 to 5,000 ft (460 to 1,520 m) to cover 1,993 miles (3,207 km)—an average speed of about 130 mph (210 km/h). On its return flight, conducted on 22 July 1937, Caledonia flew the same route in the opposite direction in a time of 12 hours; in comparison to the competing Sikorsky S-42, the Empire was able to traverse the overall route faster.

Several more survey flights of the Atlantic were made by Caledonia and Cambria. In August 1937, Cambria conducted the east–west flight in 14 hrs 24 min. In 1937, Cavalier was shipped to Bermuda and, after reassembly, started a service between there and New York City on 25 May 1937.

The Short Empire was designed to operate along the Imperial Airways routes to South Africa and Australia, where no leg was much over 500 miles (800 km). After the design of the Empire had been finalised and production had commenced, it was recognised that, with some pressure from the United States, it would be desirable to offer a similar service across the Atlantic. The range of the S.23 was less than that of the equivalent American-built counterpart in the form of the Sikorsky S-42, and as such it could not provide a true transatlantic service. Two boats (Caledonia and Cambria) were lightened and furnished with long-range tanks; both aircraft were used in experimental in-flight refuelling trials in order for them to conduct the journey; these modifications came at the cost of being able to carry fewer passengers and less cargo.

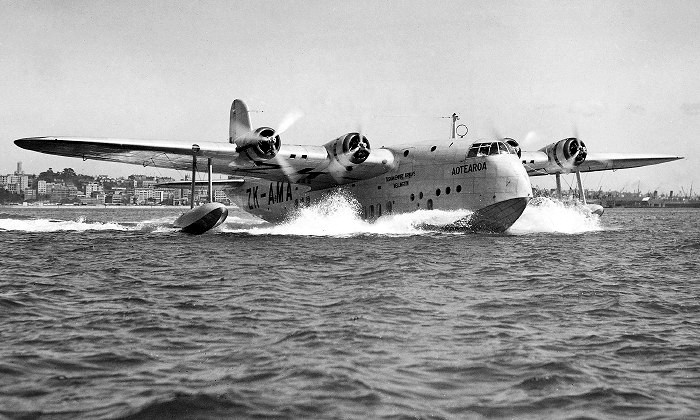
The first TEAL aircraft, ZK-AMA, named Aotearoa, at Auckland, New Zealand

In an attempt to manage the Atlantic crossing, an alternative 'piggy-back' approach was trialled. This concept had been strongly advocated for by Imperial Airways' technical adviser, Major Robert Hobart Mayo, as a means of significantly increasing both range and payload, and had been well received by both the airline and the British Air Ministry, the latter of which placed an order with Shorts. Using the S.21 design (based on the S.23) as the carrier, a smaller four-engined floatplane, the Short S.20, was mounted upon its back; the most obvious difference between the S.21 and regular S.23 aeroplanes was the additional superstructure to carry the floatplane. Only a single example was built of the S.21 carrier aircraft, named Maia, and of the S.20, named Mercury. Together, they were known as the Short Mayo Composite.

On 21 July 1938, a successful mid-air launch of Mercury was executed off the west coast of Ireland while carrying a 600 lb payload of mixed cargo and mail; it arrived at Montreal, Canada, 2,860 miles (4,600 km) 22 hrs 22 min later, having achieved an average speed of 141 mph (227 km/h). In further flights, the Empire-Mercury combination went on to set a number of long-distance records; one such flight was conducted on 6 October 1938, flying from Dundee, Scotland to Orange River, South Africa, covering 6,045 miles (9,728 km) in 42 hrs 5 min. However, in spite of the demonstrated merits and workability of the concept, the outbreak of the Second World War resulted in the effective termination of all development work. During wartime, there was interest in the concept using alternative land-based aircraft to deliver Hawker Hurricane fighter aircraft for aerial protection over the mid-Atlantic.

After Italy entered the Second World War in June 1940, it became impossible for mail to be safely flown between Britain and Egypt (and thus onto Australia) via the Mediterranean. Accordingly, a new "Horseshoe Route" was established that ran from Auckland/Sydney via Cairo (following the old "Eastern Route") to Durban, South Africa, and thence by sea to Britain. This was restricted after the loss of Singapore in February 1942 to being between Durban and Calcutta, India.

Wartime experience in operating the type at overload weights resulted in the realisation that the Empires could take off at considerably higher weights than the conservative maxima provided by Shorts and, although the last Empire crossings to America were made in 1940 (by Clare and Clyde), many more flights were made on the long, demanding and vital over-water Lisbon-Bathurst flights.

== Variants ==
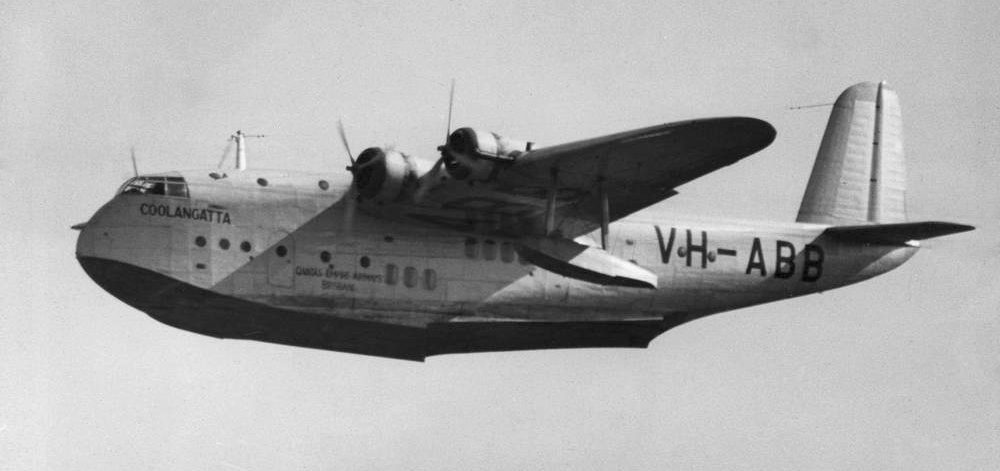
Qantas Short C Class Empire flying boat VH-ABB Coolangatta, ca. 1940

42 "C Class" Short Empire flying boats were built, including 31 S.23s, nine S.30s and two S.33s.

- S.23 Mk I : powered by four 920 hp (690 kW) Bristol Pegasus Xc poppet valve radial engines. 27 built.
- S.23 Mk II Bermuda : powered by four 920 horsepower (690 kW) Bristol Pegasus Xc poppet valve radial engines. 2 built.
- S.23 Mk III Atlantic : powered by four 920 hp (690 kW) Bristol Pegasus Xc poppet valve radial engines. two built.
- S.23M : two converted from impressed S.23 Mk I, with an ASV radar, armed with two Boulton Paul gun turrets and depth charges.
- S.30 Mk I : powered by four 890 hp (660 kW) Bristol Perseus XIIc sleeve valve radial engines. One built.
- S.30 Mk I (Cathay) : powered by four 920 hp (690 kW) Bristol Pegasus Xc poppet valve radial engines. One built.
- S.30 Mk II New Zealand : powered by four 890 hp (660 kW) Bristol Perseus XIIc sleeve valve radial engines. One built.
- S.30 Mk III Atlantic : powered by four 890 hp (660 kW) Bristol Perseus XIIc sleeve valve radial engines. Four built.
- S.30 Mk IV New Zealand : powered by four 890 hp (660 kW) Bristol Perseus XIIc sleeve valve radial engines. Two built.
- S.30M : two converted from impressed S.30 Mk III Atlantic for ASV trials and transport duties.
- S.33 : powered by four 920 hp (690 kW) Bristol Pegasus Xc poppet valve radial engines. Two completed, third example scrapped when 75% complete.

Many S.23, S.30 & S.33 were re-engined during the war with 1,010 hp (750 kW) Bristol Pegasus XXII poppet valve radial engines.

== Accidents and incidents ==
Most accidents involving the aircraft occurred during landing and were generally attributed to pilot error. For pilots trained on smaller less sophisticated aircraft judgement of height was difficult due to the high cockpit of the Empire, as well as the concept of using flaps to manage speed. With time, improved familiarity reduced the accident rate. Once in service the structure was found to be weak in places, especially on the planing bottoms, which led to later models employing thicker gauge skins on the hull and wings.

24 March 1937
G-ADVA Capricornus of Imperial Airways crashed in the Beaujolais mountains in Central France, during the inaugural Southampton to Alexandria scheduled service.
27 November 1938
G-AETV Calpurnia of Imperial Airways crashed on landing on Lake Habbaniya, Iraq with the loss of four lives.
21 January 1939
G-ADUU Cavalier of Imperial Airways ditched in the Atlantic Ocean due to carburettor icing affecting all four engines. The aircraft subsequently sank with the loss of three lives. Ten survivors were rescued by the American tanker Esso Baytown.
14 March 1939
G-ADVB Corsair (under Capt E.S. Alcock, brother of John Alcock) foundered during a forced landing on the Dungu River. After 10 months' salvage work, and one failed take-off attempt, it was flown off the river on 6 January 1940.
1 May 1939
G-ADVD Challenger of Imperial Airways crashed on landing in Mozambique Harbour with the loss of two lives.
February 1941
G-AFCX Clyde of BOAC was wrecked in a gale at Lisbon, Portugal.
29 December 1941
G-ADUX Cassiopeia of BOAC crashed after striking debris on takeoff from Sabang, Indonesia, killing four.
30 January 1942
G-AEUH Corio of BOAC was shot down by seven Japanese fighter aircraft and crashed off West Timor, killing 13 of the 18 people on board. The aircraft was owned by BOAC, but was operated by Qantas.
28 February 1942
G-AETZ Circe of Qantas was shot down 170 nmi (320 km) south of Java by Mitsubishi G4M "Betty" aircraft of the Imperial Japanese Navy with the loss of all on board.
22 April 1943
G-AEUB (VH-ADU) crashed off Port Moresby, with 18 survivors.

== List of aircraft ==
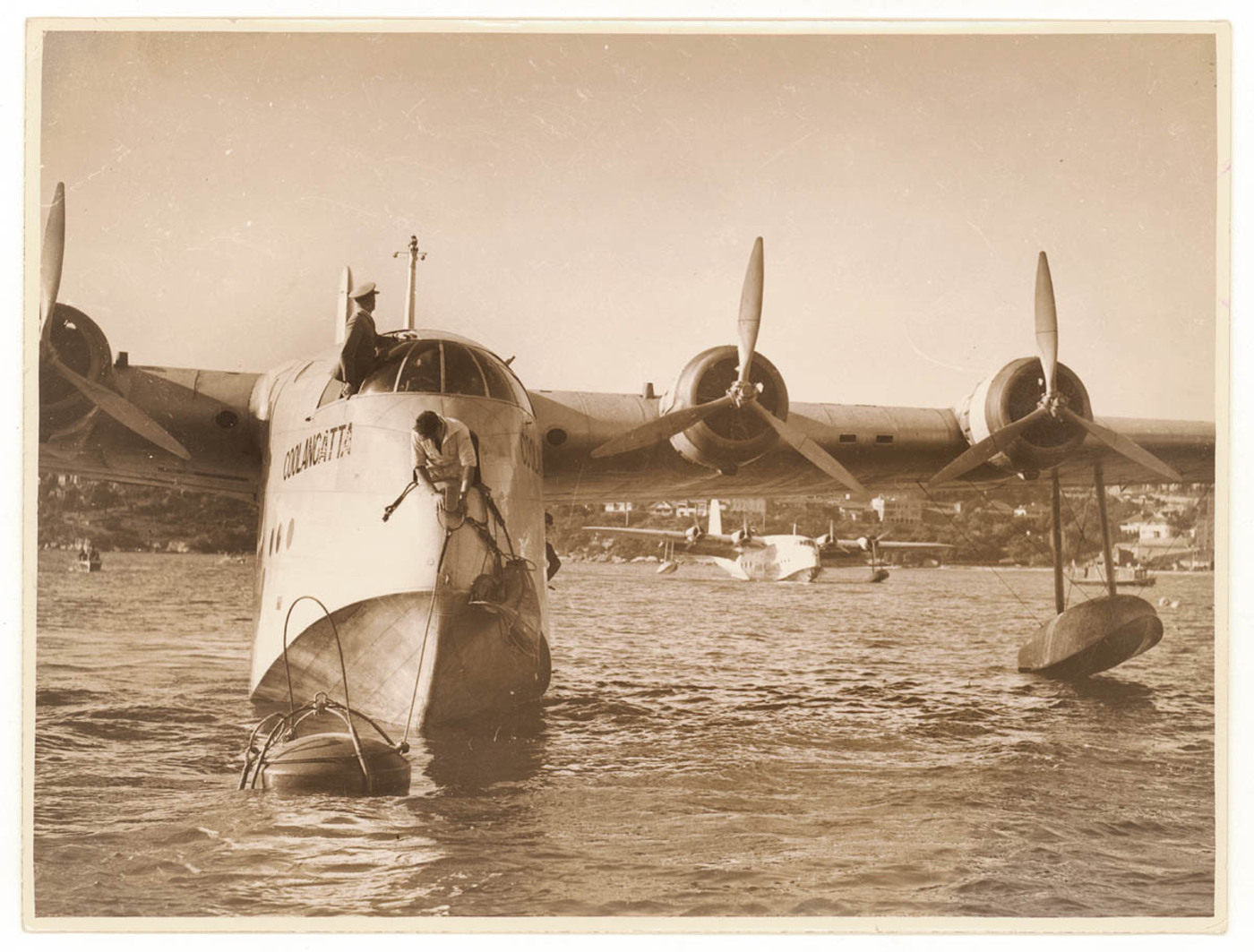
Empire G-AFBK, Coolangatta, June 1936

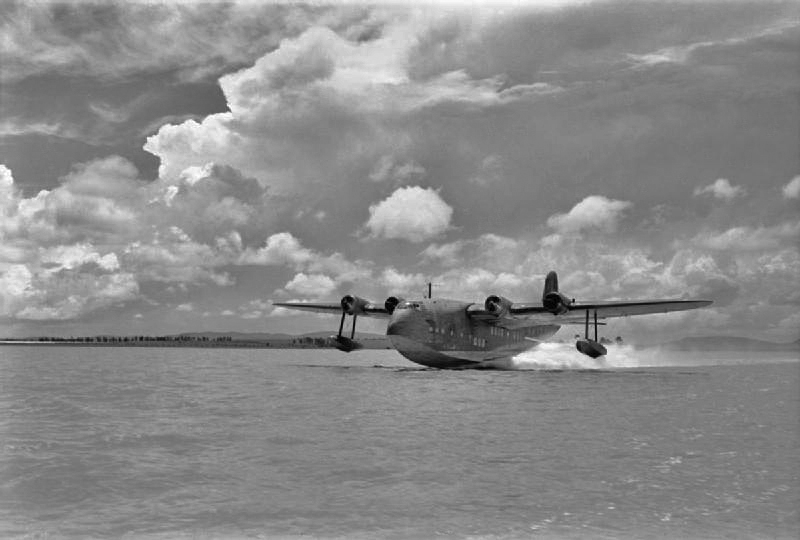
Empire G-AFKZ, Cathay, at Vaal Dam, South Africa, circa 1942

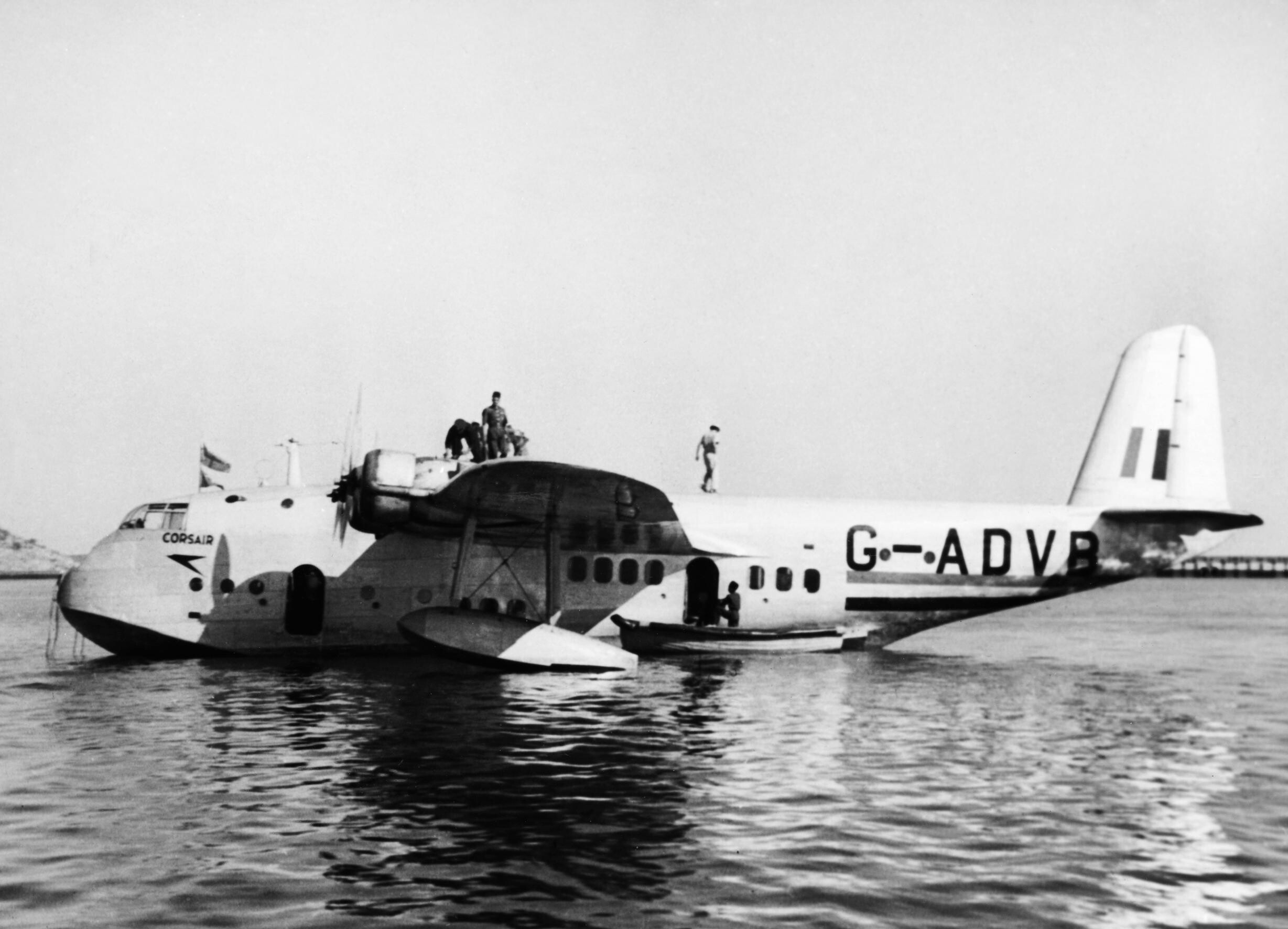
Empire G-ADUV, Corsair, moored on the lake at Gwalior, India

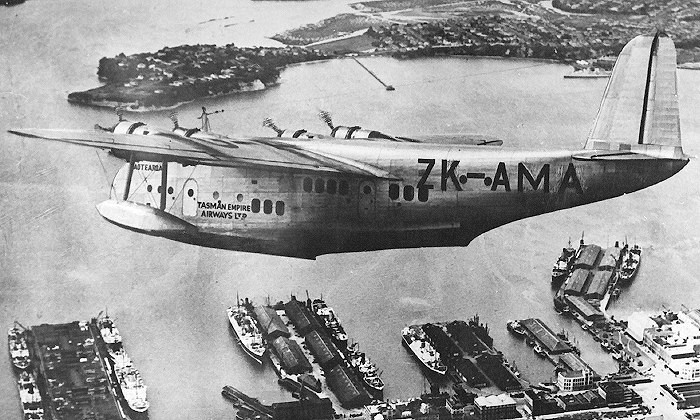
Empire ZK-AMA, Aotearoa, flying above Auckland, New Zealand

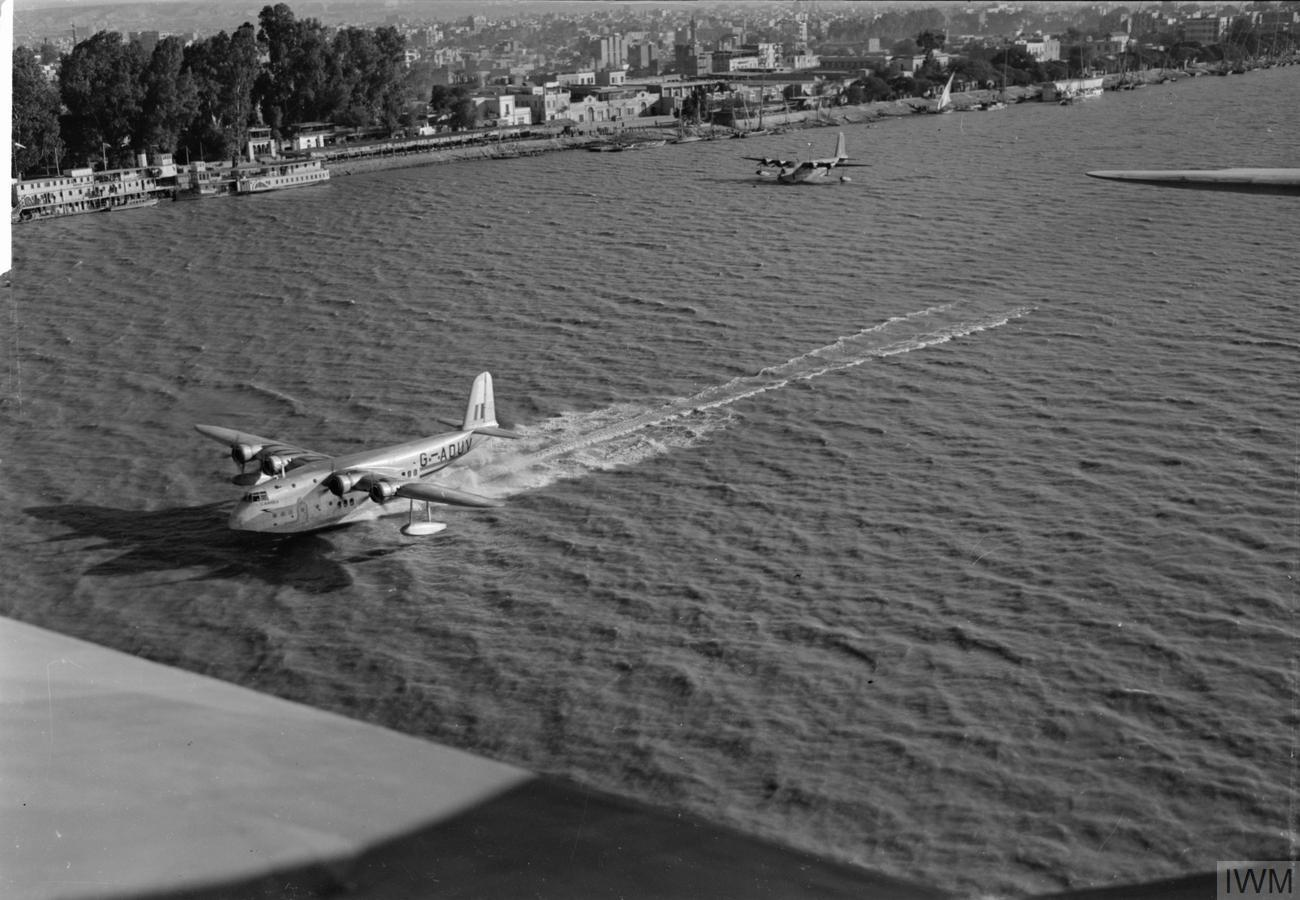
Empire G-ADUV, Cambria, taking off from the Nile at Rod El Farag flying boat base, Cairo

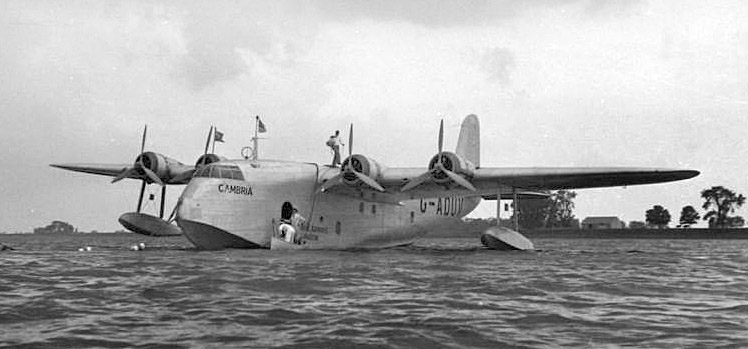
Empire G-ADUV, idling in the water

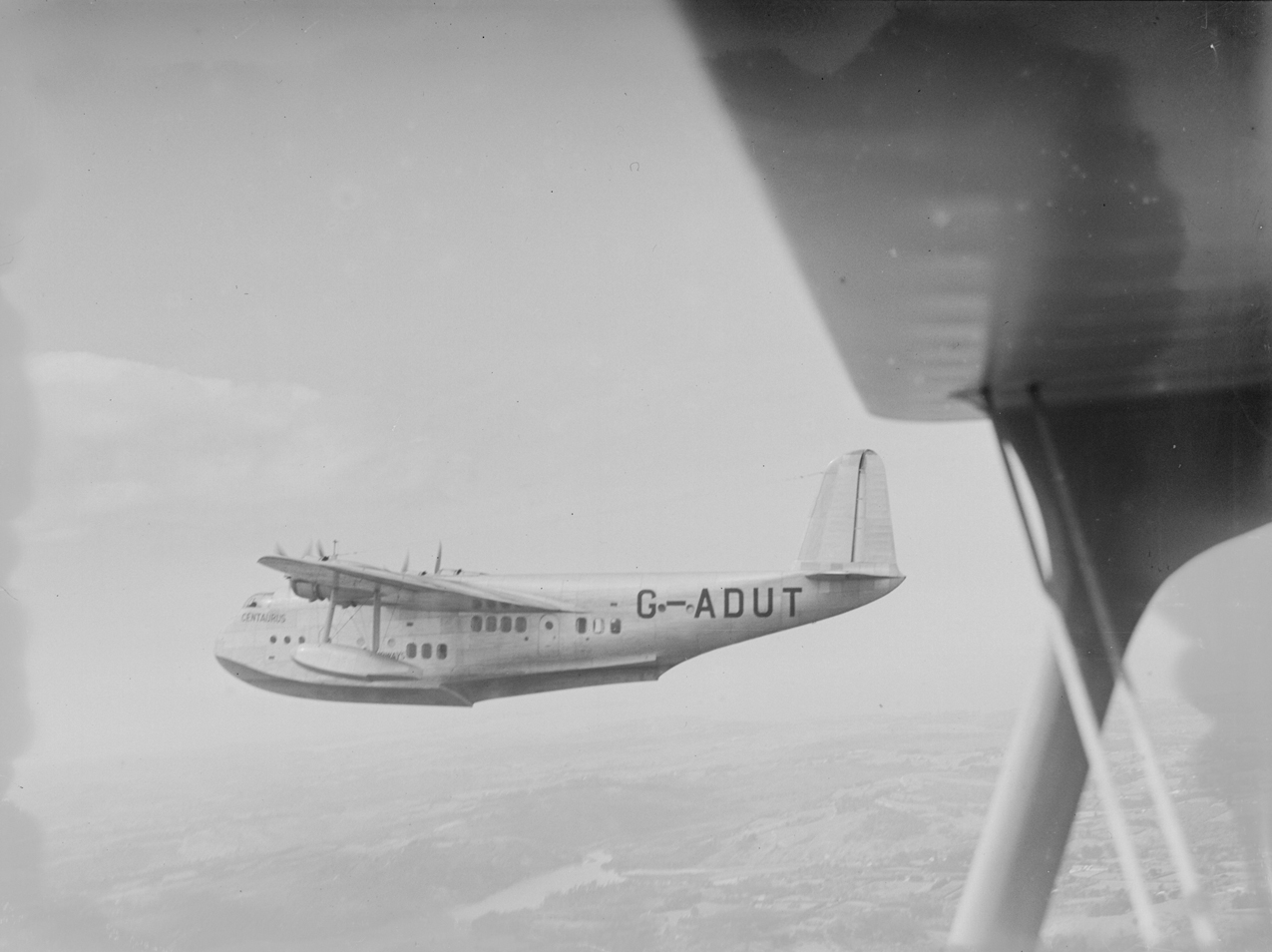
Empire G-ADUT, Centaurus photographed in flight from a Beech Staggerwing

List of aircraft
Registration	Name	Operator
S.23
G-ADHL	Canopus	Imperial Airways/BOAC
G-ADHM	Caledonia	Imperial Airways, later BOAC
G-ADUT	Centaurus	Imperial Airways, to Royal Australian Air Force (RAAF) in 1939 (as serial A18-10)
G-ADUU	Cavalier	Imperial Airways. Crashed 21 January 1939
G-ADUV	Cambria	Imperial Airways, later BOAC
G-ADUW	Castor	Imperial Airways, later BOAC
G-ADUX	Cassiopeia	Imperial Airways, later BOAC
G-ADUY	Capella	Imperial Airways
G-ADUZ	Cygnus	Imperial Airways
G-ADVA	Capricornus	Imperial Airways
G-ADVB	Corsair	Imperial Airways, later BOAC
G-ADVC	Courtier	Imperial Airways
G-ADVD	Challenger	Imperial Airways
G-ADVE	Centurion	Imperial Airways
G-AETV	Coriolanus	Imperial Airways, later BOAC, to QANTAS in 1942 (as registration VH-ABG)
G-AETW	Calpurnia	Imperial Airways.
G-AETX	Ceres	Imperial Airways, later BOAC
G-AETY	Clio	Imperial Airways, later BOAC, to Royal Air Force (RAF) in 1940 (as AX659). Crashed 22 August 1941
G-AETZ	Circe	Imperial Airways, later BOAC
G-AEUA	Calypso	Imperial Airways, to QANTAS in 1939 not used directly, to RAAF (as serial A18-11)
G-AEUB	Camilla	Imperial Airways, later BOAC, to QANTAS (as VH-ADU)
G-AEUC	Corinna	Imperial Airways, later BOAC
G-AEUD	Cordelia	Imperial Airways, later BOAC, to RAF in 1940 (as AX660), returned to BOAC in 1941 (as G-AEUD)
G-AEUE	Cameronian	Imperial Airways, later BOAC
G-AEUF	Corinthian	Imperial Airways, later BOAC
G-AEUG	Coogee	Imperial Airways, to QANTAS in 1938 (as VH-ABC), to RAAF in 1939 (as A18-12)
G-AEUH	Corio	Imperial Airways, to QANTAS in 1938 (as VH-ABD), to Imperial Airways in 1939 (as G-AEUH)
G-AEUI	Coorong	Imperial Airways, to QANTAS in 1938 (as VH-ABE), to Imperial Airways in 1939 (as G-AEUI)
G-AFBJ	Carpentaria	Imperial Airways not used, to QANTAS in 1937 (as VH-ABA), to BOAC in 1942 (as G-AFBJ)
G-AFBK	Coolangatta	Imperial Airways not used, to QANTAS in 1937 (as VH-ABB), to RAAF in 1939 (as A18-13)
G-AFBL	Cooee	Imperial Airways not used, to QANTAS in 1937 (as VH-ABF) to BOAC in 1942
S.30
G-AFCT	Champion	Imperial Airways, later BOAC
G-AFCU	Cabot	Imperial Airways, to RAF in 1939 (as V3137). Destroyed 5 May 1940
G-AFCV	Caribou	Imperial Airways, to RAF in 1939 (as V3138). Destroyed 6 May 1940
G-AFCW	Connemara	Imperial Airways
G-AFCX	Clyde	Imperial Airways, later BOAC
G-AFCY	Captain Cook	Imperial Airways, to TEAL in 1940 (as ZK-AMC Awarua). Sold as obsolete in 1948
G-AFCZ	Australia then Clare	Imperial Airways, to TEAL in 1940 (as ZK-AMB), later to BOAC
G-AFDA	Aotearoa	Imperial Airways, to TEAL in 1940 (as ZK-AMA). Sold as obsolete in 1948
G-AFKZ	Cathay	Imperial Airways, later BOAC
S.33
G-AFPZ	Clifton	BOAC April 1940, to RAAF (as A18-14), to QANTAS in 1942 (as VH-ACD). Crashed January 1944.
G-AFRA	Cleopatra	BOAC May 1940, 1st Service 5 June 1940 Poole to Durban. Final Service ended 5 November 1946 at Poole. Scrapped 1946.

== Operators ==
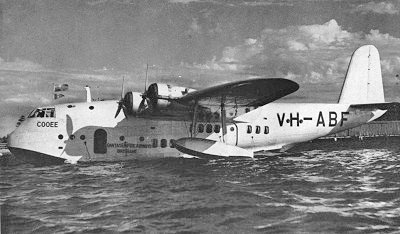
Short S.23 Cooee of Qantas—this aircraft is also pictured at the top of the page while later serving with BOAC, as G-AFBL

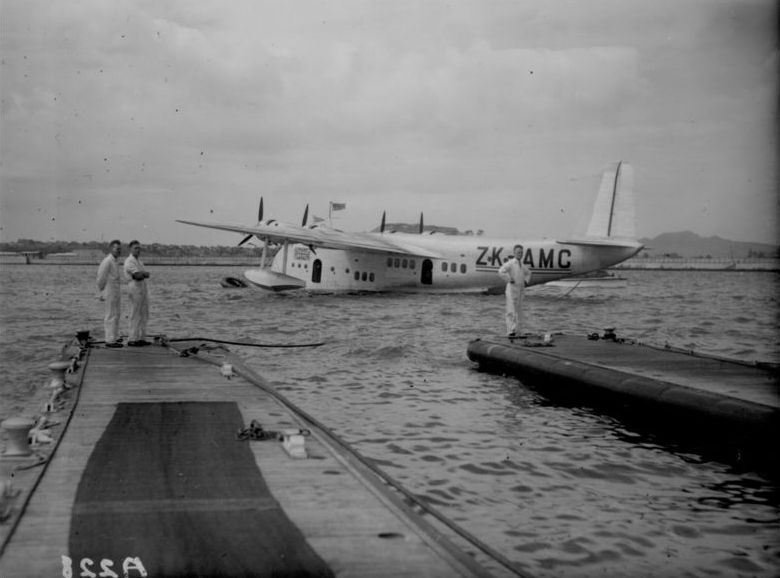
The third TEAL aircraft, ZK-AMC, named Awarua, circa 1940

=== Civil operators ===
Australia

- Qantas

New Zealand

- TEAL

United Kingdom

- Imperial Airways
- BOAC

=== Military operators ===
Australia

- Royal Australian Air Force
  - No. 11 Squadron RAAF
  - No. 13 Squadron RAAF
  - No. 20 Squadron RAAF
  - No. 33 Squadron RAAF
  - No. 41 Squadron RAAF

United Kingdom

- Royal Air Force
  - No. 119 Squadron RAF

== Specifications (Short S.23) ==
Data from The Encyclopedia of World Aircraft, The Short Empire Boats

General characteristics

- Crew: 5 (2 pilots, navigator, flight clerk and steward)
- Capacity:
  - 24 day passengers or 16 sleeping passengers
  - 1.5 ton of mail
- Length: 88 ft 0 in (26.82 m)
- Wingspan: 114 ft 0 in (34.75 m)
- Height: 31 ft 9 3/4 in (9.696 m)
- Wing area: 1,500 sq ft (140 m^{2})
- Empty weight: 23,500 lb (10,659 kg)
- Gross weight: 40,500 lb (18,370 kg)
- Powerplant: 4 × Bristol Pegasus Xc radial engines, 920 hp (690 kW) each

Performance

- Maximum speed: 200 mph (320 km/h, 170 kn)
- Cruise speed: 165 mph (266 km/h, 143 kn)
- Range: 760 mi (1,220 km, 660 nmi)
- Service ceiling: 20,000 ft (6,100 m)
- Rate of climb: 950 ft/min (4.8 m/s)

== See also ==
External videos
- Compilation of statistics and footage on the Short Empire flying boats
- Period amateur video of an Empire in Sumba, Indonesia, in 1937
- British Pathé newsreel of a Empire Flying Boat flying the first experimental flight from Sydney to Southampton

- Sikorsky S-42
- Potez-CAMS 141

Related development

- Short Sarafand
- Short Knuckleduster
- Short Scion Senior
- Short Mayo Composite
- Short S.26
- Short Sunderland

Aircraft of comparable role, configuration, and era

- Boeing 314
- Latécoère 611
- Martin China Clipper

Related lists

- List of aircraft of World War II
- List of flying boats and floatplanes
