= Aubrey Smith =

Aubrey Smith may refer to:

- Aubrey Henry Smith (1814–1891), lawyer, U.S. district attorney and railroad executive
- Sir C. Aubrey Smith (1863–1948), English actor and cricketer
- Sir Aubrey Smith (Royal Navy officer) (1872–1957), British admiral
- Aubrey Smith (long jumper) (born 1988), Jamaican long jumper
