= John Aubrey (disambiguation) =

John Aubrey (1626–1697), was an English antiquary and writer.

John Aubrey may also refer to:

- John Aubrey (MP for City of London), represented City of London (Parliament of England constituency)
- Sir John Aubrey, 2nd Baronet (c. 1650–1700), English MP for Brackley
- Sir John Aubrey, 3rd Baronet (1680–1743), British MP for Cardiff
- Sir John Aubrey, 6th Baronet (1739–1826), British MP for Wallingford, Aylesbury, Buckinghamshire, Clitheroe, Aldeburgh, Steyning, and Horsham
- Jack Aubrey, fictional character in the Aubrey–Maturin series of novels by Patrick O'Brian

== See also ==
- Tiny Gooch (John Aubrey Gooch, 1903–1986), American football player
- Sir John Aubrey-Fletcher, 7th Baronet (1912–1992), British soldier and cricketer
