= Aubrey Givens =

American football and basketball coach

Biographical details
- Born: June 21, 1912; Nebraska, U.S.
- Died: September 16, 1983 (aged 71); Lincoln, Nebraska, U.S.

Coaching career (HC unless noted)

Football
- 1952: Doane

Basketball
- 1952–1955: Doane

Head coaching record
- Overall: 4–5 (football); 20–52 (basketball)

Aubrey J. Givens (June 21, 1912 – September 16, 1983) was an American football and basketball coach. He was the 24th head football coach at Doane College in Crete, Nebraska, serving for one season, in 1952 and compiling a record of 4–5. Givens was also the head basketball coach at Doane from 1952 to 1955, tallying a mark of 20–52.

== Head coaching record ==
=== Football ===
| Year | Team | Overall | Conference | Standing | Bowl/playoffs |
|---|---|---|---|---|---|
Doane Tigers (Nebraska College Conference) (1952)
| 1952 | Doane | 4–5 | 4–3 | T–3rd | |
| Doane: | | 4–5 | 4–3 | | |
| Total: | | 4–5 | | | |
