= James Aubrey =

James Aubrey may refer to:

- James Aubrey (actor) (1947–2010), English actor
- James T. Aubrey (1918–1994), American television and film executive
- Jimmy Aubrey (1887–1983), English actor
- James Aubrey (Bones), a fictional character
