= Aubrey Powell =

Aubrey Powell may refer to:

- Aubrey Powell (designer) (born 1946), English graphic designer
- Aubrey Powell (footballer) (1918–2009), Welsh football player
