= Germany–Liberia relations =

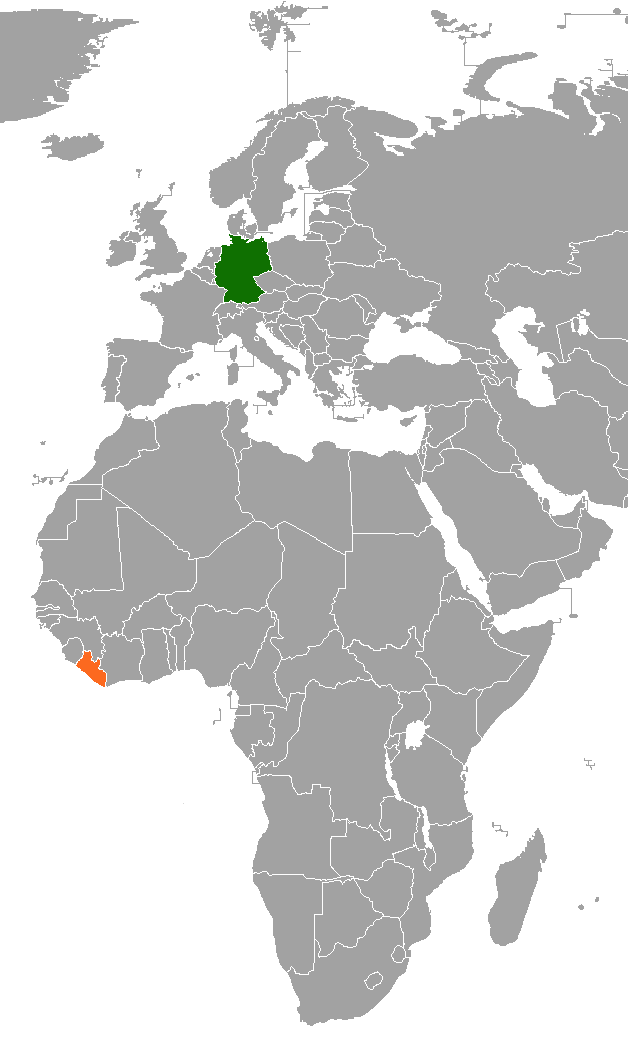

- Germany: Liberia

After Liberian independence, Germany and Liberia become connected economically. The economic ties were broken during the World Wars. The two countries re-established connections following the World Wars.

== History ==
Before German unification, Liberia's independence was recognized by the Hanseatic Republics of Lübeck, Bremen, and Hamburg in 1855. Years prior to that, Hamburg merchant Carl Woermann established the first trading venture with Liberia. In 1858, Carl Goedelt, who was Woermann's representative, was appointed as the Hamburg Consul in Monrovia.

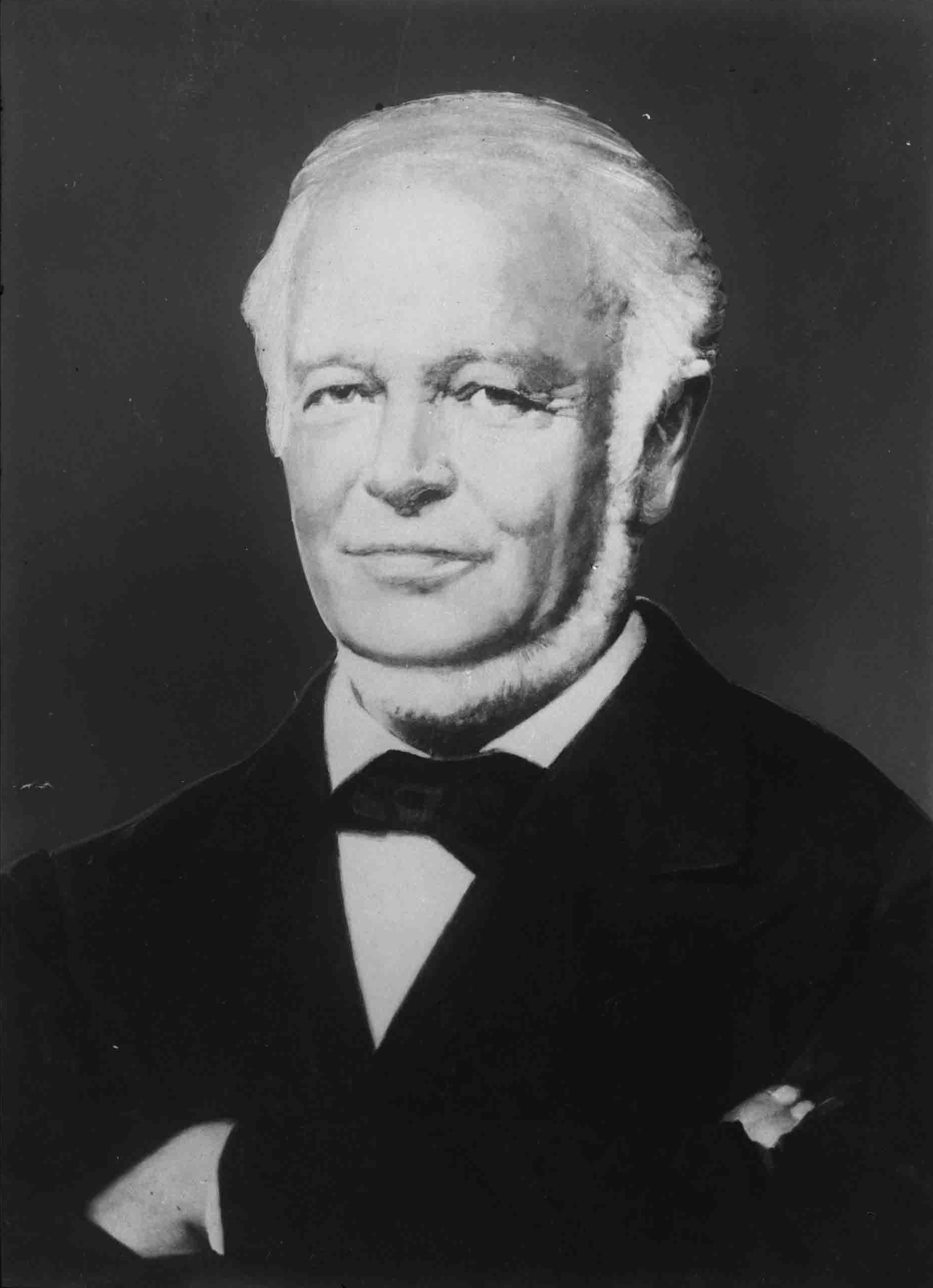
Carl Woermann, who established a trading venture with Liberia before 1855

=== Pre-World War I relations ===
Prior to World War I, Liberia and Germany had extensive trading ties. In 1906, the British estimated that Germany had over three-fourths of Liberia's trade. These ties came in the form of imports, exports, and by the early 1900s, German retailing in Liberia. It was through German shipping that Liberia maintained a majority of its connection with international trade. German shipping also relied on the labor of Kru deck workers and stevedores from Liberia. The Liberian government accrued a significant amount of debt to German firms. Between 1898 and 1916, a number of indigenous uprisings against the Liberian government resulted in the damaging of German property, which caused the German government to make claims against the Liberian government for damages. In 1912, these unresolved claims resulted in a display of gunboat diplomacy by the German government, but there was ultimately a peaceful resolution.

While there was a large amount of trade between Germany and Liberia, the German government mostly neglected to provide large amounts of capital investment into Liberia, unlike the United Kingdom, which had provided Liberia with loans which had compromised much of Liberia's sovereignty and gave the British government much influence over Liberian affairs. A major loan between the United Kingdom, along with other Western powers including Germany, the United States, and France, was negotiated in 1911, under Liberian President Arthur Barclay, and ratified in 1912, under Liberian President Daniel E. Howard. This was the third, in a series of two other major, uneven loans taken out by the Liberian government. The loan borrowed $1,700,000 for Liberia, with the conditions including that the four countries would be able to each appoint General Receivers of Customs, which limited the powers of the Liberian Secretary of the Treasury. The 1912 loan was paid off in 1926, with a loan from the Finance Corporation of America. The primary beneficiaries of the 1912 loan were British banks.

=== World War I and Interwar period relations ===
Initially, Liberia was neutral in World War I. President Daniel E. Howard was wary of going to war against Germany due to their economic ties. From 1915 to 1916, Britain and France used their influence over Liberia to pressure it into adopting policies to lower the amount of trade between it and Germany. The United Kingdom also denied Germany sea lines, which also had an effect over Germany's ability to facilitate trade with Liberia. In 1917, Liberia declared war against Germany. This resulted in the crippling of the Liberian economy. In 1918, Germany bombarded Monrovia with one of its U-boats.

Following World War I, trade between Liberia and Germany resumed, though it would never reach the same prominence as it did pre-war. In 1922, Momulu Massaquoi became consul-general in Hamburg. Massaquoi was one of the first indigenous African resident diplomats in Europe.

=== World War II and post-war relations ===
Liberia again remained neutral initially in World War II. In the 1940s, the United Kingdom used its influence to again restrict German trade in Liberia. It did this, in 1941, by ordering the Bank of Monrovia to stop handling German accounts, as well as denying safe passage to vessels from Germany to Liberia. On 27 January 1944, Liberia declared war against Germany.

Following the war, Liberia established relations with West Germany on 23 July 1953, and established relations with East Germany on 28 September 1973. By 1982, West Germany made up 28% of trade with Liberia, it making up 40% of the market for Liberian iron ore. In 1990, due to the First Liberian Civil War, Germany suspended relations with Liberia. In 2005, upon the conclusion of the Second Liberian Civil War, Germany re-established relations with Liberia. In 2007, Chancellor Angela Merkel made a state visit to Liberia. In 2008 and 2015, President Ellen Johnson Sirleaf made state visits to Germany.

All imports from Liberia to Germany are duty-free and quota-free, with the exception of armaments, as part of the Everything but Arms initiative of the European Union.

== See also ==
- Foreign relations of Germany
- Foreign relations of Liberia
- Liberia in World War I
- Liberia in World War II
