= SS Burutu =

A number of steamships were named Burutu, including

- SS Burutu (1902), a British cargo ship that was lost in 1918 due to a collision with another ship.
- SS Burutu (1918), a British cargo ship in service 1920–34
