= Mediterranean Theater of Operations, United States Army =

Military unit

North African Theater of Operations, United States Army (1942–1944) Mediterranean Theater of Operations, United States Army (1944–1947)
- Active: 4 February 1943–17 September 1947
- Country: United States
- Engagements: French Algeria-French Morocco; French Tunisia; Sicily; Naples-Foggia; Anzio; Rome-Arno; Southern France; Northern Apennines; Po Valley

Commanders
- Notable commanders: Dwight D. Eisenhower; Jacob L. Devers; Joseph T. McNarney; Matthew B. Ridgway; John C. H. Lee

Insignia
- Shoulder sleeve insignia

The Mediterranean Theater of Operations, United States Army (MTOUSA), originally called the North African Theater of Operations, United States Army (NATOUSA), was a military formation of the United States Army that supervised all U.S. Army forces which fought in North Africa and Italy during World War II.

United States Army operations in the theater began with Operation Torch, when Allied forces landed on the beaches of northwest Africa on 8 November 1942, and concluded in the Italian Alps some 31 months later, with the German surrender in Italy on 2 May 1945. For administrative purposes, U.S. components were responsible to Headquarters North African Theater of Operations, United States Army (NATOUSA), which was created 14 February 1943. NATOUSA was redesignated Mediterranean Theater of Operations, United States Army (MTOUSA), on 26 October 1944.

== Origins ==
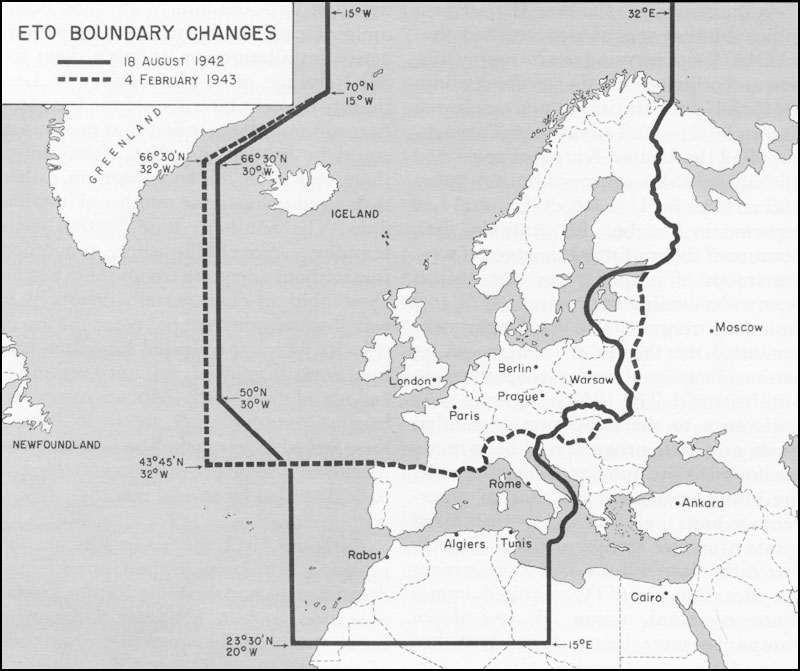
ETO Boundary changes 1942-1943

Allied Force Headquarters (AFHQ) was created on 12 September 1942 to launch Operation Torch, the Allied invasion of French North Africa. At the time, this was within the boundaries of the European Theater of Operations, United States Army (ETOUSA). The initial Commander-in-Chief (C-in-C) of the Allied (Expeditionary) Force, was Lieutenant General Dwight D. Eisenhower. Lieutenant General Mark W. Clark was deputy commander-in-chief. As Supreme Allied Commander, Eisenhower controlled the ground forces through Major General George S. Patton Jr, Major General Lloyd R. Fredendall, and British Lieutenant-General Sir Kenneth Anderson. The naval forces were commanded by British Admiral Sir Andrew Browne Cunningham, and the air forces by Air Marshal Sir William Welsh and Brigadier General James H. Doolittle.

== North African Theater of Operations ==
The North African Theater of Operations (NATO) included French Africa, Spain, Portugal and Italy. For administrative purposes, US forces were controlled by Headquarters North African Theater of Operations, United States Army (NATOUSA), which was activated in Algiers on 4 February 1943. Eisenhower commanded both the Allied Force and NATOUSA. The boundaries of NATOUSA were not the same as those of the Allied theater, and included all of French North Africa, Spain, Portugal, Austria and Switzerland.

Brigadier General Everett S. Hughes, who had been responsible for the logistical planning of Operation Torch at ETOUSA, arrived in North Africa on 12 February 1943 to become the deputy theater commander and commanding general of the Communications Zone. The three base sections, the Atlantic Base Section at Casablanca, the Mediterranean Base Section at Oran and the Eastern Base Section at Constantine, became part of the Services of Supply, North African Theater of Operations, United States Army (SOS NATOUSA), commanded by Major General Thomas B. Larkin, which was responsible for the logistical support of U.S. Army forces in the Mediterranean.

British General Sir Harold Alexander became commander of the British 18th Army Group, which was activated on 19 February 1943, and was responsible for the detailed planning and preparation, and the actual conduct, of combat operations. In effect, Alexander was the ground commander. Air forces were grouped under the Mediterranean Air Command under Air Chief Marshal Sir Arthur Tedder, which became active the day before. This included the US Ninth and Twelfth Air Forces.

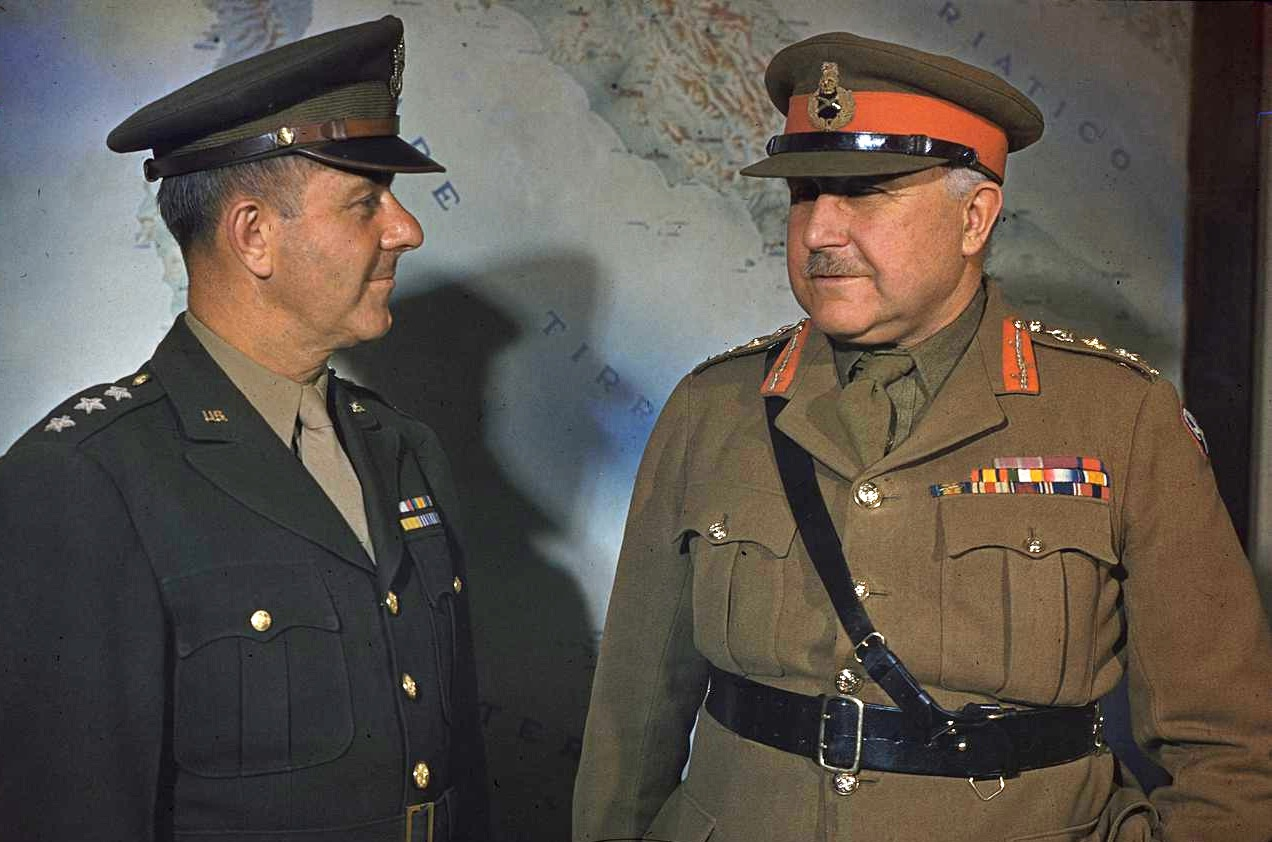
British General Sir Henry Maitland Wilson (right), the Supreme Allied Commander, Mediterranean Theatre, with his American deputy, Lieutenant General Jacob L. Devers, who also commanded the American NATOUSA.

For the Allied invasion of Sicily, Alexander was appointed Eisenhower's deputy commander in chief and responsible for ground warfare, while Cunningham and Tedder remained the naval and air commanders respectively. Having overseen the early stages of the Italian Campaign, Eisenhower left AFHQ on 8 January 1944 and returned to England to assume command of the forces assembling for Operation Overlord, codename for the Allied landings in Northwest Europe. He was succeeded as Supreme Allied Commander in the Mediterranean by British General Sir Henry Maitland Wilson. Lieutenant General Jacob L. Devers became Wilson's Deputy Supreme Commander and also the commanding general of NATOUSA.

Operation Dragoon, the Allied landings in Southern France, was conducted by the Mediterranean Theater. An advance echelon of SOS NATOUSA was organized in Italy and arrived at Dijon on 12 September to control the Delta Base Section and Continental Advance Section (CONAD). SOS NATOUSA became Communications Zone (COMZONE) NATOUSA on 1 October, Lieutenant General Joseph T. McNarney succeeded Devers as the Deputy Commander of NATOUSA on 22 October, allowing Devers to devote all his time and energy to running the 6th Army Group in France. The 6th Army Group was activated on 1 August, and it became operational in France on 15 September.

NATOUSA was redesignated Mediterranean Theater of Operations, United States Army (MTOUSA), on 1 November 1944, and no longer had any responsibilities in Southern France. MTOUSA boundaries were considerably diminished (on the north) from those of NATOUSA, and U.S. Army forces in southern France passed to the administrative control of ETOUSA. The forces in Southern France had their own line of communications from MTOUSA, but by February 1945 the integration of the Southern Line of Communications (SOLOC) with ETO Communications Zone had progressed to the point where the SOLOC headquarters was superfluous, and SOLOC was abolished on 6 February 1945.

Wilson remained Supreme Allied Commander for just under a year, until 21 November 1944, when he was sent to Washington to head of the British Joint Staff Mission, a position rendered vacant by the death of Field Marshal Sir John Dill on 4 November 1944. Wilson was succeeded by Field Marshal Sir Harold Alexander, who remained until the end of the war.

Headquarters MTOUSA and General Headquarters CMF formally separated from AFHQ on 1 October 1945, leaving AFHQ to consist of a small interallied staff responsible for combined command liquidation activities and commanded by British Lieutenant General Sir William Duthie Morgan as Supreme Allied Commander Mediterranean. AFHQ was abolished, effective 17 September 1947, by General Order 24, AFHQ, 16 September 1947. McNarney was succeeded as Deputy Theater Commander and Ccommanding general MTOUSA by Lieutenant General Matthew B. Ridgway, who in turned was succeeded in December 1945 by Lieutenant General John C. H. Lee, who commanded through 1946 and 1947.

The Africa-Middle East Theater of Operations was "established on March 1, 1945, was mainly concerned with the liquidation of the Army's property holdings and other interests in Africa, Palestine, and the Persian Gulf area. The North African installations of the Mediterranean Theater and its base commands at Casablanca were transferred to the new Theater in March 1945; the United States Army Forces in Liberia were transferred to it in April 1945." "The United States Army Forces in Liberia were subsequently under the North African Service Command, which was the former Mediterranean Base Section, at Casablanca. By 1946 all [the Town Commands] except the agency at Casablanca were discontinued."

== Campaigns ==
- Algeria-French Morocco (Allied invasion of French North Africa) 8–11 November 1942
- Tunisia 17 November 1942 – 13 May 1943
- Sicily 9 July-17 August 1943
- Naples-Foggia 18 August 1943 – 21 January 1944 (Air); 9 September 1943 – 21 January 1944 (Ground)
- Anzio 22 January-24 May 1944
- Rome-Arno 22 January-9 September 1944
- Southern France 15 August-14 September 1944
- Northern Apennines 10 September 1944 – 4 April 1945
- Po Valley 5 April-8 May 1945

== A theater of operations ==
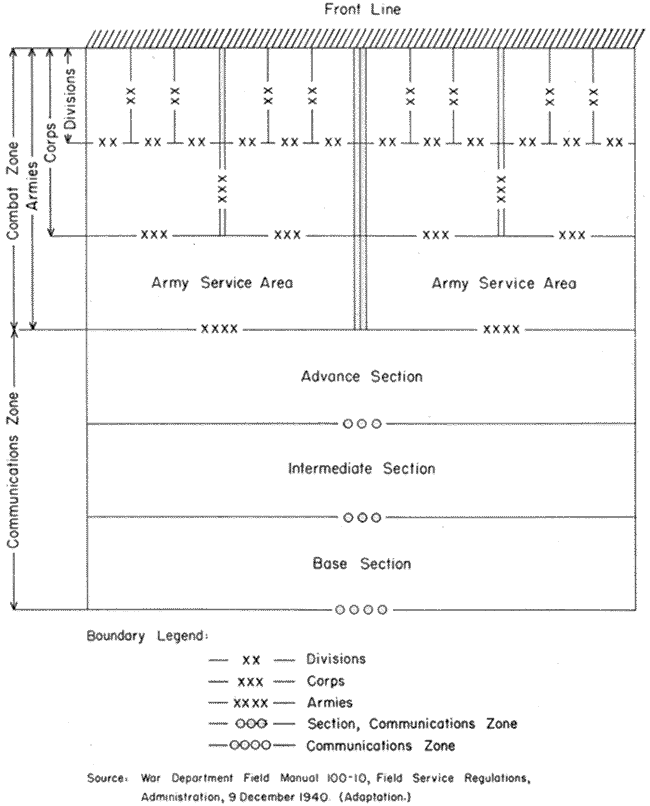
Chart 12.- Typical organization of a theater of operations as envisaged by War Department Doctrine, 1940

The term "theater of operations" was defined in the [American] field manuals as the land and sea areas to be invaded or defended, including areas necessary for administrative activities incident to the military operations (chart 12). In accordance with the experience of World War I, it was usually conceived of as a large land mass over which continuous operations would take place and was divided into two chief areas-the combat zone, or the area of active fighting, and the communications zone, or area required for administration of the theater. As the armies advanced, both these zones and the areas into which they were divided would shift forward to new geographic areas of control.
