= Palestine Airlines =

Palestine Airlines may refer to:

- Palestine Airways, airline in British Palestine
- Palestinian Airlines, airline owned by the Palestinian Authority and based in Arish, Sinai Peninsula, Egypt
