= Rochester Airport =

Rochester Airport may refer to:

- Greater Rochester International Airport (ICAO: KROC) in Rochester, New York, United States
- Rochester International Airport (ICAO: KRST) in Rochester, Minnesota, United States
- Rochester Airport (Kent) (ICAO: EGTO) in Rochester, Kent, England, United Kingdom
