= Short Scion =

Twin engine short haul aircraft

S.16 Scion/Scion II
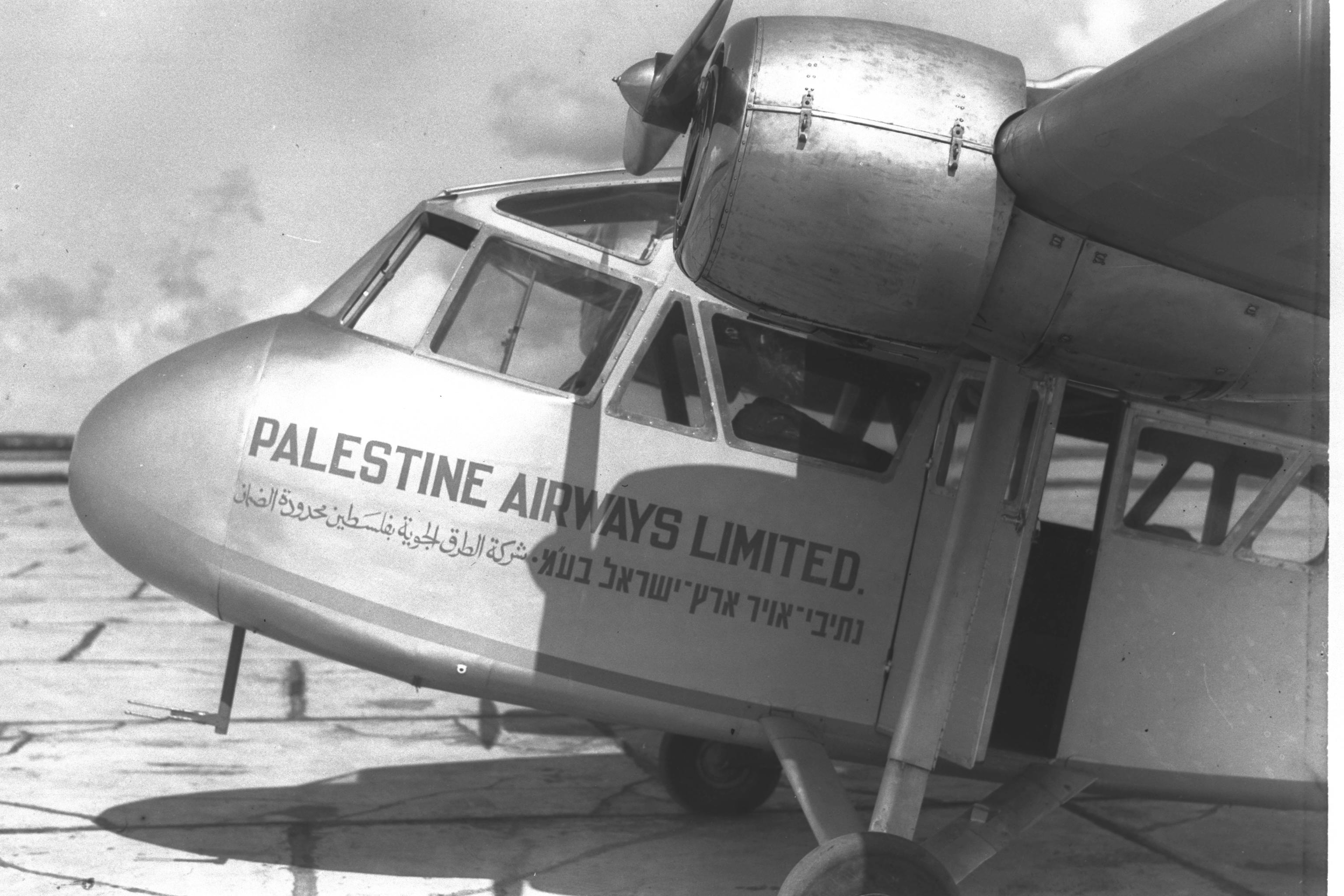
- Palestine Airways Pobjoy-Short Scion II, 1938

General information
- Type: Light transport landplane/floatplane
- Manufacturer: Short Brothers; Pobjoy Airmotors Ltd.
- Designer: Arthur Gouge
- Status: Retired
- Number built: 22; Scion: 5 Scion II: 17

History
- First flight: 18 August 1933
- Variant: Short S.22 Scion Senior

The Short S.16 Scion and Scion II were 1930s British two-engine, cantilever monoplanes built by Short Brothers and (under licence) by Pobjoy Airmotors and Aircraft Ltd. in Rochester, Kent between 1933 and 1937. Altogether 22 Scion/Scion II aircraft were built and they provided useful service to operators working from small airstrips/water courses in many parts of the globe, including Europe, the Near and Middle East, Sierra Leone, Papua New Guinea and Australia. Many were impressed into the Royal Air Force during the Second World War, providing pilot ferry services, anti-aircraft co-operation and radar calibration duties. Of the civilian Scions, at least two were still operating in Australia in 1966, one having been re-engined with de Havilland Gipsy Minor engines.

== Design ==
The Scion and the later Scion II version were high wing cantilever monoplanes with fabric-covered metal wings and fuselage, the latter providing an enclosed cabin for the pilot and 5–6 passengers. The tail unit comprised a cantilever tailplane with a single fin and rudder. The prototype aircraft was powered by two 80 hp (60 kW) Pobjoy R radial engines; the production aircraft however were fitted with the 90 hp (67 kW) Pobjoy Niagara III radial engines. The engines in the Scion were mounted with thrust-lines below the chord-line of the wings; in the Scion II they were raised so that the thrust-lines were aligned with the chord-line, to avoid trim changes in pitch with changes in power. Both the Scion and the Scion II were produced as either landplanes or floatplanes, the majority as landplanes (see the table below). On the landplanes the landing gear comprised a single wheel on each side of the fuselage, mounted on a vertical coil-spring and oleo leg inboard of the engine; there was a small castoring tailwheel mounted below the rear end of the fuselage.

== History ==
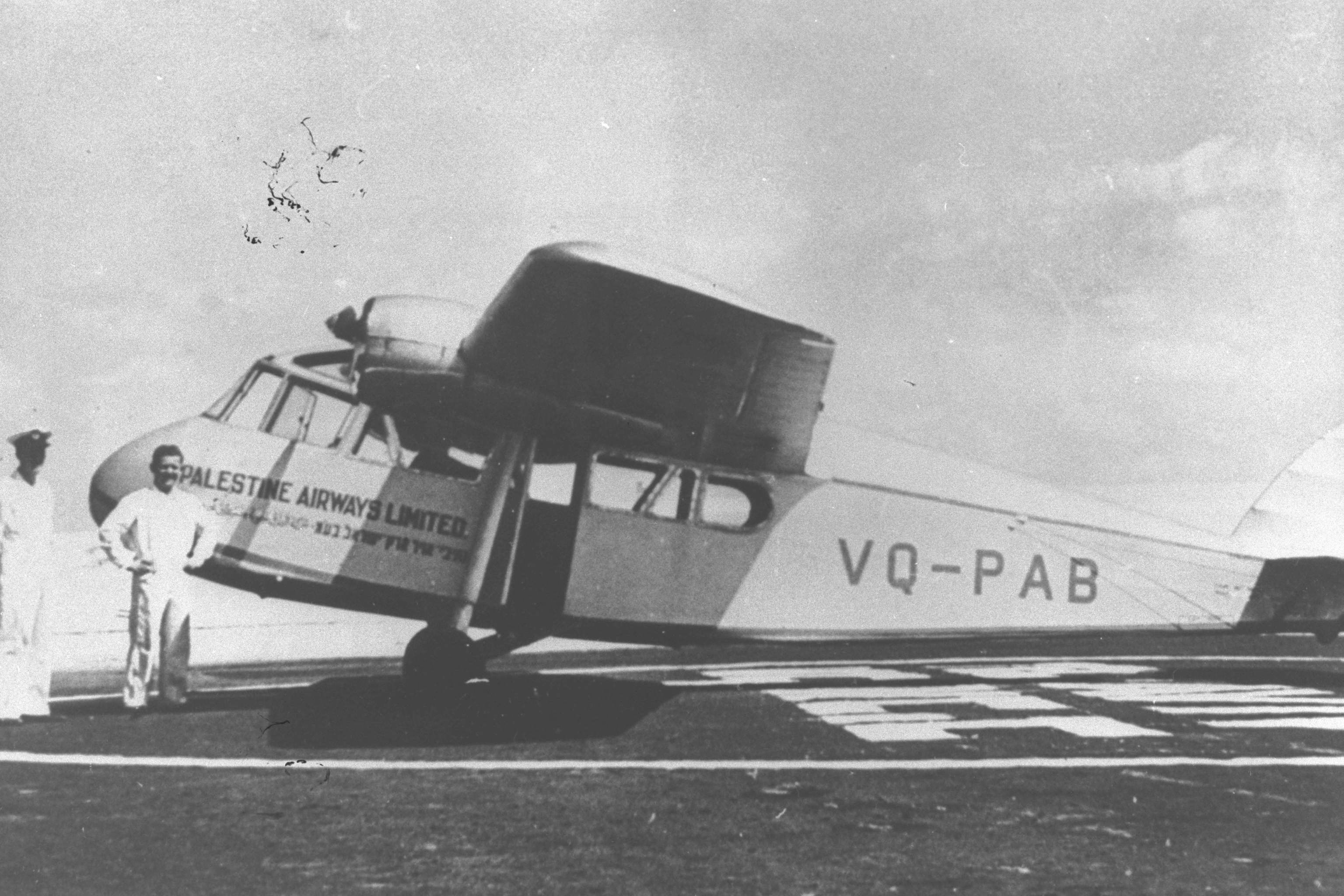
Scion II, VQ-PAB, at the service of Palestine Airways Ltd in 1938

The Scion was developed as a light transport for 5–6 passengers. The first flight of the prototype aircraft (G-ACJI) took place on 18 August 1933, piloted by Shorts' Chief Test Pilot John Lankester Parker. The first production aircraft (G-ACUV) was flown at the SBAC's airshow at Hendon in 1934. In 1935 the fifth production model was built as the revised model Scion II; the major improvement was the repositioning of the two engines as noted above; other changes included the provision of 6 passenger seats as standard (on the original Scion there was a folding seat for a sixth passenger if needed), an improved windscreen and better cabin windows. During the production of the Scions the company had opened a new factory at Rochester Airport and all Scion IIs were manufactured there, initially by Shorts, later by Pobjoy, first under licence and later under Shorts' ownership.

G-ADDR, the fifth Scion II, was retained by Shorts as an experimental testbed aircraft, and it was on this aircraft (temporarily designated M.3) that a scale wooden model of the slender wings (with Gouge flaps) for the later Short Empire boats was tested, the first flight in this configuration being conducted by Lankester Parker on 6 August 1935. With these flaps fitted it was tested at the Royal Aircraft Establishment, which found that the Gouge flap decreased distance to take-off and stalling speed, among other improvements. Further work with standard wings was carried out; one flight from Rochester Airport, with experimental full-span flaps incorporating retractable spoilers instead of ailerons, was made on 22 July 1936; this idea proved unworkable, Lankester Parker having to draw on his considerable experience to coax the aircraft around on a single circuit before landing safely. The standard wing was refitted and the aircraft continued with Shorts in this configuration until it was impressed into military service in 1940, an operational usage experienced by 14 of the 22 Scion/Scion II aircraft.

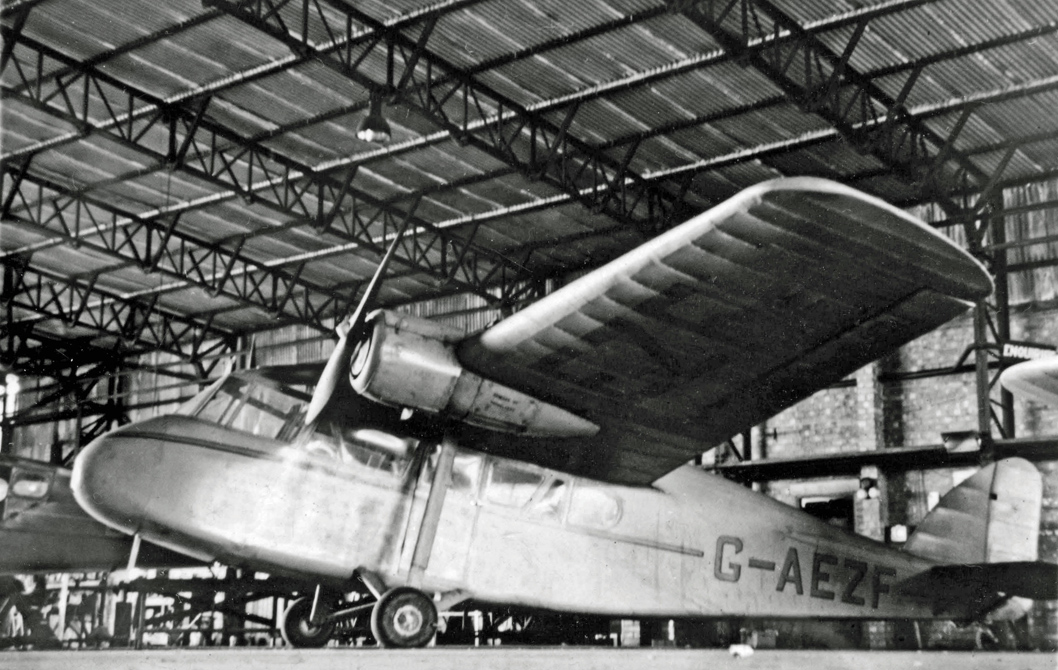
Pobjoy-built S.16/1 Scion 2 G-AEZF hangared at Blackpool Airport in 1948

G-AEZF, built by Pobjoy and first flown in December 1937, was originally operated as a floatplane by Elders Colonial Airways in Sierra Leone, between Bathurst (Gambia) and Freetown, and was returned to Shorts in 1939 and converted into a landplane in 1941. After operating for the company for another six years it was eventually sold on to Air Couriers Ltd. in 1947, after which it changed hands between private owners several times before finally ending up at Southend airport. The plane is now undergoing restoration by Medway Aircraft Preservation Society (MAPSL), funded in part by a grant from the Rochester Bridge Trust.

A larger 9-passenger enlarged version of Scion was produced as the Short S.22 Scion Senior.

== Survivors ==
G-AEZF
After a long career, this aircraft stood derelict at Southend Airport. Its frame was rescued and held for long-term restoration by the Medway Aircraft Preservation Society at Rochester Airport. Newly restored, it was exhibited at Rochester Cathedral by the Rochester Bridge Trust in August 2025.

G-ACUX
one of the 'Australian' Scions still flying in the 1960s, was later returned to the United Kingdom and is held in deep storage at the Ulster Folk and Transport Museum, Cultra, Holywood, Northern Ireland. It is claimed that its condition has been allowed to deteriorate. It was not on public display in April 2012.

VH-UTV
another 'Australian' Scion. Under restoration at Luskintyre in New South Wales to return to operable condition. Privately owned.

== Variants ==
- S-16 Scion : Company designation.
- Scion : Light transport aircraft, powered by two 85 hp (63 kW) Pobjoy Niagara I or II piston engines. Five built, one prototype and four production machines.
- Scion II : Light transport aircraft, powered by two 90 hp (67 kW) Pobjoy Niagara III piston engines.
- M.3: Scion II fitted with scaled-down Empire flying-boat wings with Gouge flaps

== Scion and Scion II production ==
List of aircraft
	Aircraft	Type	First flight	Type	Manufacturer	Built	Notes
1	G-ACJI	Landplane	18 August 1933	Scion (prototype)	Shorts	Seaplane Works	to RAF in 1940
2	G-ACUV	Landplane	18 August 1933	Scion	Shorts	Seaplane Works	
3	G-ACUW	Landplane	18 August 1933	Scion	Shorts	Seaplane Works	to RAF in 1940
4	G-ACUX	Floatplane	18 August 1933	Scion	Shorts	Seaplane Works	
5	G-ACUY	Landplane	10 December 1934	Scion	Shorts	Seaplane Works	to RAF in 1940
6	G-ACUZ	Landplane	13 February 1935	Scion II	Shorts	Rochester Airport	
7	G-ADDN	Landplane	9 June 1935	Scion II	Shorts	Rochester Airport	to RAF in 1940
8	G-ADDO	Landplane	10 July 1935	Scion II	Shorts	Rochester Airport	to RAF in 1940
9	G-ADDP	Landplane	10 July 1935	Scion II	Shorts	Rochester Airport	to RAF in 1940
10	G-ADDR	Landplane	6 August 1935	Scion II	Shorts	Rochester Airport	to RAF in 1940
11	VH-UUT	Landplane	23 August 1935	Scion II	Shorts	Rochester Airport	
12	G-ADDT	Landplane	–	Scion II	Shorts	Rochester Airport	
13	VH-UVQ	Landplane	-	Scion II	Shorts	Rochester Airport	
14	G-ADDV	Landplane	–	Scion II	Shorts	Rochester Airport	to RAF in 1940
15	VH-UTV	Landplane	–	Scion II	Shorts	Rochester Airport	
16	G-ADDX	Landplane	–	Scion II	Shorts	Rochester Airport	to RAF in 1940
17	VQ-PAA	Landplane	–	Scion II	Pobjoy	Rochester Airport	to RAF in 1941
18	VQ-PAB	Landplane	–	Scion II	Pobjoy	Rochester Airport	to RAF in 1941
19	G-AEIL	Landplane	1936	Scion II	Pobjoy	Rochester Airport	to RAF in 1940
20	G-AEJN	Landplane	September 1936	Scion II	Pobjoy	Rochester Airport	to RAF in 1940
21	G-AETT	Landplane	April 1937	Scion II	Pobjoy	Rochester Airport	to RAF in 1940
22	G-AEZF	Floatplane	9 December 1937	Scion II	Pobjoy	Rochester Airport	preserved

== Operators ==
Floatplanes

Australia

- Papuan Concessions Ltd (VH-UUP the former G-ACUX)

Sierra Leone

- Elders Colonial Airways Ltd (Bathurst-Freetown) (G-AEZF)

Landplanes

Aden

- Arabian Airlines Ltd

Australia

- Adelaide Airways Ltd (VH-UTV & VH-UUT)
- Marshall Airways Ltd (VH-UUP)

British Mandate for Palestine

- Palestine Airways Ltd (Haifa-Lydda)

Sierra Leone

- Elders Colonial Airways Ltd

United Kingdom

- Aberdeen Airways
- Air Couriers Ltd
- Airwork Ltd
- Atlantic Coast Air Services Ltd
- Golden Eagle Marine & Air
- Great Western & Southern Air Lines Ltd
- Lundy and Atlantic Coast Air Lines Ltd
- Nottingham Airport Ltd
- Olley Air Services Ltd
- Palestine Airways Ltd
- Pobjoy Airmotors and Aircraft Ltd
- Ramsgate Airport Ltd
- Royal Air Force
  - No. 173 Squadron RAF
- Short Brothers Ltd
- Southend-on-Sea Flying Services Ltd
- Southern Airways Ltd
- West of Scotland Air Services Ltd (Renfrew-Mull)
- Williams & Co., Squires Gate, Blackpool
- Yorkshire Airways Ltd

== Specifications (Scion II landplane) ==
Data from British Civil Aircraft 1919–1972: Volume III

General characteristics

- Crew: 1
- Capacity: 6 passengers
- Length: 31 ft 6 in (9.60 m)
- Wingspan: 42 ft 0 in (12.80 m)
- Height: 10 ft 4 1/2 in (3.162 m)
- Wing area: 255.3 sq ft (23.72 m^{2})
- Empty weight: 1,770 lb (803 kg)
- Gross weight: 3,200 lb (1,451 kg)
- Fuel capacity: 31 imp gal (37 US gal; 141 L)
- Powerplant: 2 × Pobjoy Niagara III 7-cylinder geared radial engines, 90 hp (67 kW) each
- Propellers: 2-bladed wooden fixed-pitch propellers

Performance

- Maximum speed: 128 mph (206 km/h, 111 kn)
- Cruise speed: 116 mph (187 km/h, 101 kn)
- Range: 390 mi (630 km, 340 nmi)
- Service ceiling: 13,000 ft (4,000 m)
- Rate of climb: 625 ft/min (3.18 m/s)
- Take-off run: 420 ft (130 m)
- Landing run: 420 ft (130 m)

== See also ==
Related development

- Short Scion Senior

Related lists

- List of aircraft of the Royal Air Force
