= 25th Station Hospital Unit =

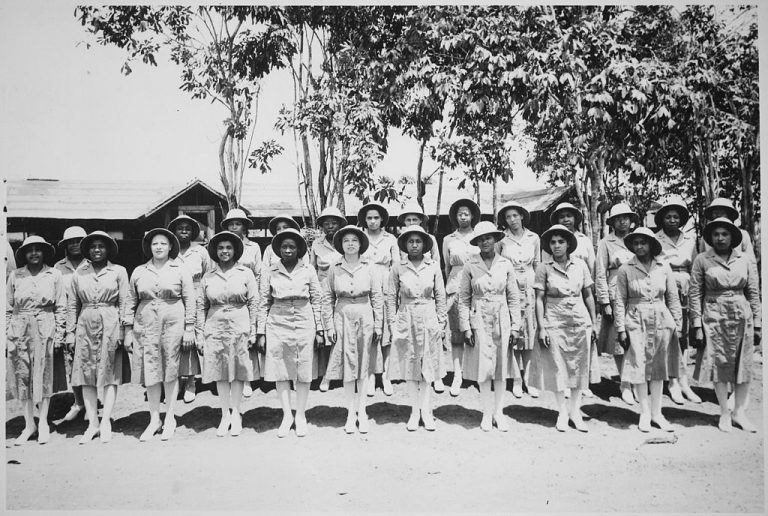
25th Station Hospital personnel in Liberia in 1943.

The 25th Station Hospital was an all African American unit of nurses who served in the Army Nurse Corps during World War II. The unit was the first African American group sent overseas and were stationed for a short tour in Liberia in 1943.

== About ==
The 25th Station Hospital was the first United States Army medical unit of African American service members to deploy overseas during World War II. These nurses from the Army Nurse Corps were sent to Liberia in March 1943. There were 30 nurses in the unit and they were there to support United States troops on airfields and rubber plantations. The group's chief nurse was First Lieutenant Susan E. Freeman and they were stationed on Roberts Field. Most of the soldiers they tended suffered from malaria.

The nurses did not carry weapons and to show this, they all wore Red Cross arm bands. They were also issued helmets, gas masks and canteens. The work that the nurses were asked to do was duplicated by Army corpsmen and morale among the nurses' unit suffered. The same year they were deployed, the 25th Station Hospital Unit was recalled because of the morale issue and poor health in the unit.

In April 1944, official from Liberia requested and were granted permission to honor Lieutenant Freeman with the Liberian Human Order of African Redemption. She was also awarded a Mary Mahoney Award from the National Association of Colored Graduate Nurses in 1944 for her work in Liberia.

== See also ==
- Liberia in World War II
