= Short Scion Senior =

S.22 Scion Senior
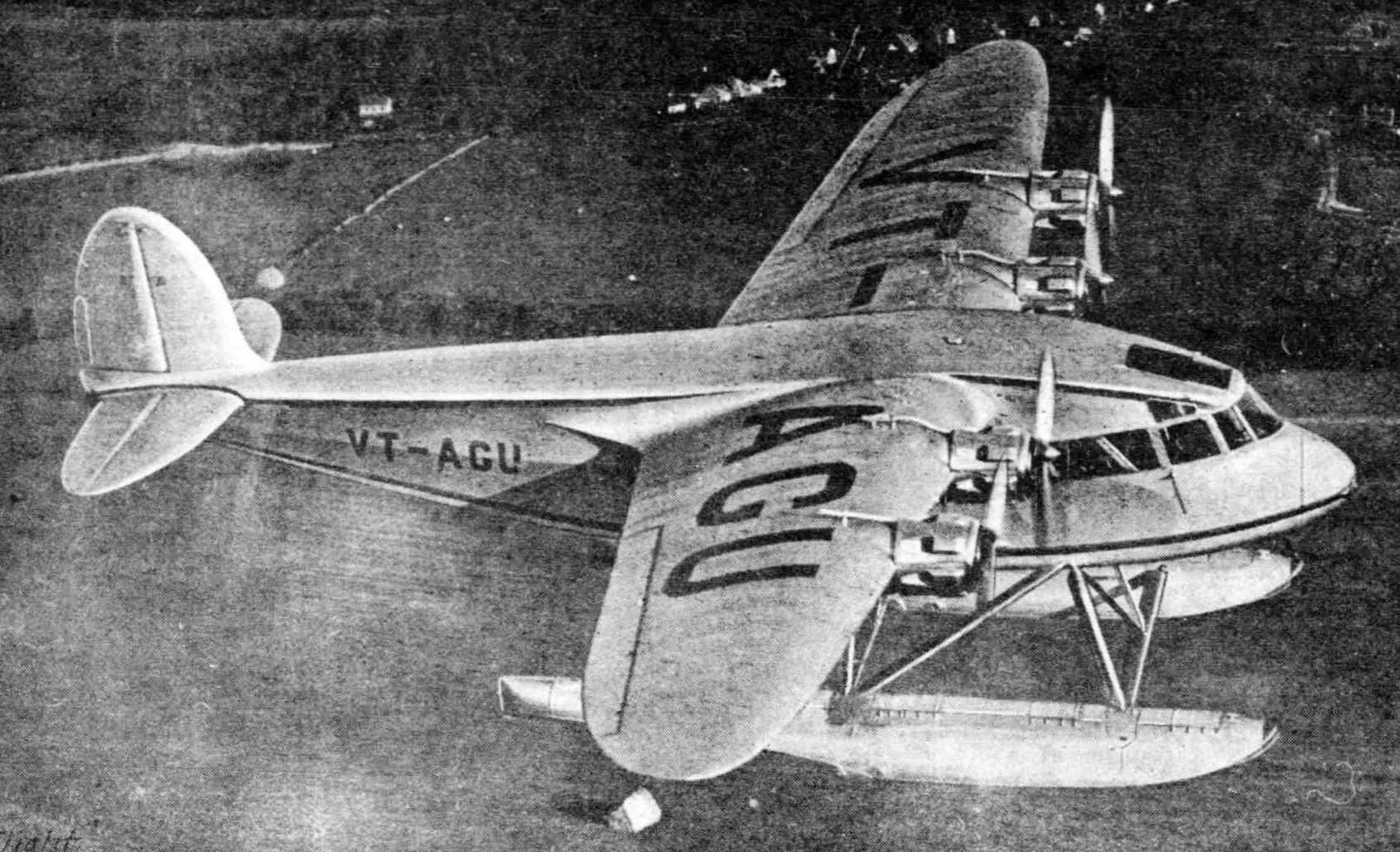

General information
- Type: Transport floatplane
- Manufacturer: Short Brothers
- Status: Retired
- Number built: 6

History
- Introduction date: 1935
- First flight: 1935
- Developed from: Short S.16 Scion

The Short S.22 Scion Senior was a 1930s British four-engined nine-passenger floatplane built by Short Brothers.

== Design and development ==
The Scion Senior was developed as an enlarged version of the Scion light transport for nine passengers. Unfortunately, the aircraft failed to win orders from internal airline operators, who had already adopted the De Havilland Dragon and Dragon Rapide; instead it proved attractive as a seaplane for survey and river transport purposes overseas, and the first order came from the Irrawaddy Flotilla Co. in Burma, with a promise of further orders if the first seaplane proved satisfactory. So the Scion Senior was designed basically as a seaplane with an alternative land chassis. The first two aircraft, built as floatplanes, were shipped to Rangoon as soon as they had received their Certificate of Airworthiness; the third aircraft was built as a landplane for Shorts to use as a demonstrator; the remaining three were built as floatplanes, although one (S.835, G-AENX) was actually first flown as a landplane before being converted to its intended floatplane configuration.

== Operational history ==
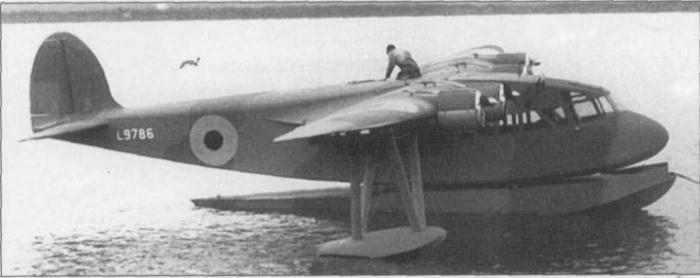
Short Scion Senior FB (L9786)

The last aircraft built (serial number L9786) was acquired by the Air Ministry for testing flying boat hull designs particularly for the Short Sunderland. Redesignated the Scion Senior FB (for Flying Boat), it was fitted with a duralumin, flush-riveted central float and outrigger floats. During 1942, a series of trials by the Marine Aircraft Experimental Establishment (MAEE) was undertaken, determining attitude and stability characteristics of the design. The sole test example was lost at sea on 15 March 1944 off Helensburgh, Argyll, when an attempt was made to take off from the Clyde in frosty conditions. H.G. White, a Flight Test Officer at MAEE Helenburgh, died when the aircraft stalled into the water and sank. The other two members of the crew were rescued.

The Scion Senior landplane was eventually sold to Palestine Air Transport in December 1938, to be based in Haifa. It was impressed into Royal Air Force service in the Middle East in February 1942 and lost in action on 22 September 1943.

== Operators ==
Floatplane

British India

- Irrawaddy Flotilla Co Ltd

British Mandate for Palestine

- Palestine Airways Ltd

Sierra Leone

- Elders Colonial Airways Ltd

United Kingdom

- Air Ministry (MAEE)
- Royal Air Force
- West of Scotland Air Services Ltd

Landplane

Iraq

- Iraq Petroleum Transport Co Ltd

United Kingdom

- Jersey Airways Ltd
- Royal Air Force
- Short Brothers (demonstrator)

== Specifications (Scion Senior Floatplane) ==
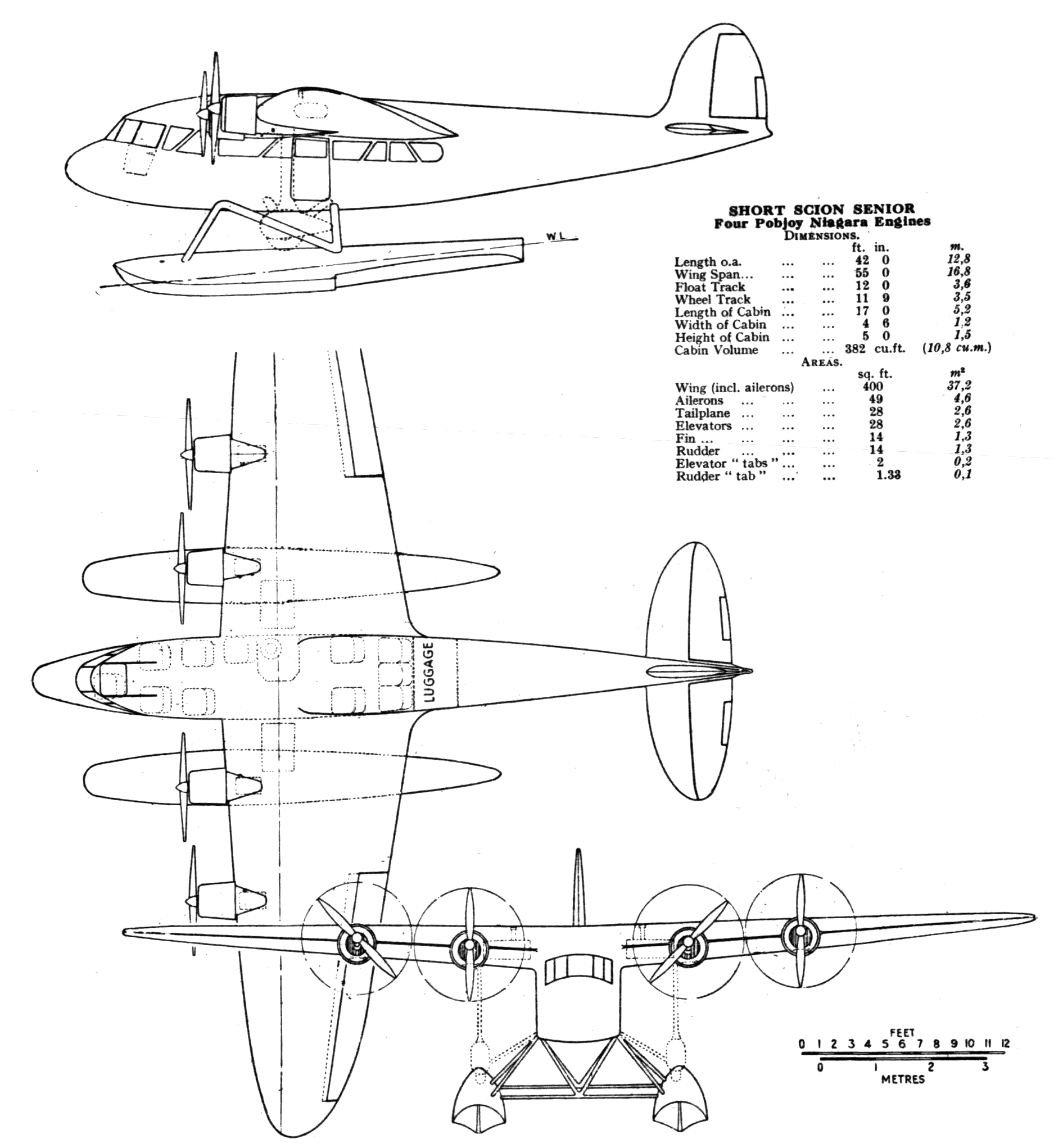
Short Scion Senior 3-view drawing from NACA-AC-200

Data from Shorts Aircraft since 1900

General characteristics

- Crew: 1
- Capacity: 10 passengers
- Length: 42 ft 0 in (12.80 m)
- Wingspan: 55 ft 0 in (16.76 m)
- Wing area: 400 sq ft (37 m^{2})
- Empty weight: 3,650 lb (1,656 kg)
- Gross weight: 5,750 lb (2,608 kg)
- Fuel capacity: 60 imp gal (72 US gal; 270 L)
- Powerplant: 4 × Pobjoy Niagara III 7-cylinder radial engines, 90 hp (67 kW) each

Performance

- Maximum speed: 134 mph (216 km/h, 116 kn)
- Cruise speed: 115 mph (185 km/h, 100 kn)
- Range: 400 mi (640 km, 350 nmi)
- Service ceiling: 10,000 ft (3,000 m)
- Rate of climb: 650 ft/min (3.3 m/s)

== See also ==
Related development

- Short Sunderland

Related lists

- List of aircraft of the Royal Air Force
