= SS Burutu (1902) =

British steamship

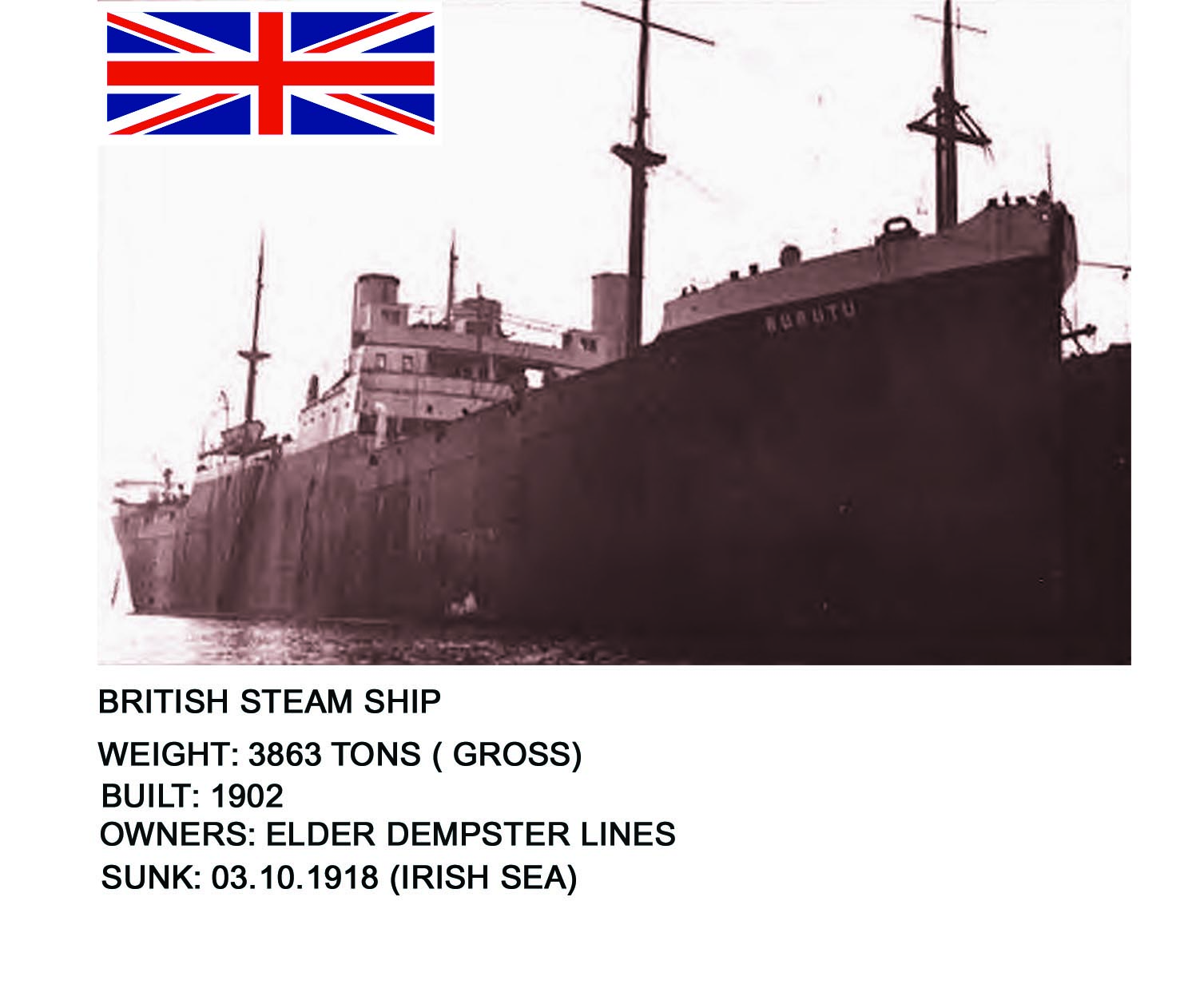

History

United Kingdom
- Name: SS Burutu
- Namesake: Burutu
- Owner: Elder Dempster Lines
- Operator: British and African Steam Navigation Company
- Port of registry: Liverpool
- Builder: Alexander Stephen and Sons, Linthouse
- Launched: 11 February 1902
- Identification: Official number: 115280
- Fate: Sunk after collision, 3 October 1918

General characteristics
- Tonnage: 3,863 GRT
- Length: 360 ft (110 m)
- Beam: 44 ft (13 m)
- Propulsion: 3-cylinder triple expansion steam engine, 1 screw

SS Burutu was a British steamship, sunk after a collision with the steamship City of Calcutta off the coast of South Wales about 25 miles south-west of Bardsey Island in the Irish Sea on 3 October 1918.

== Ship history ==
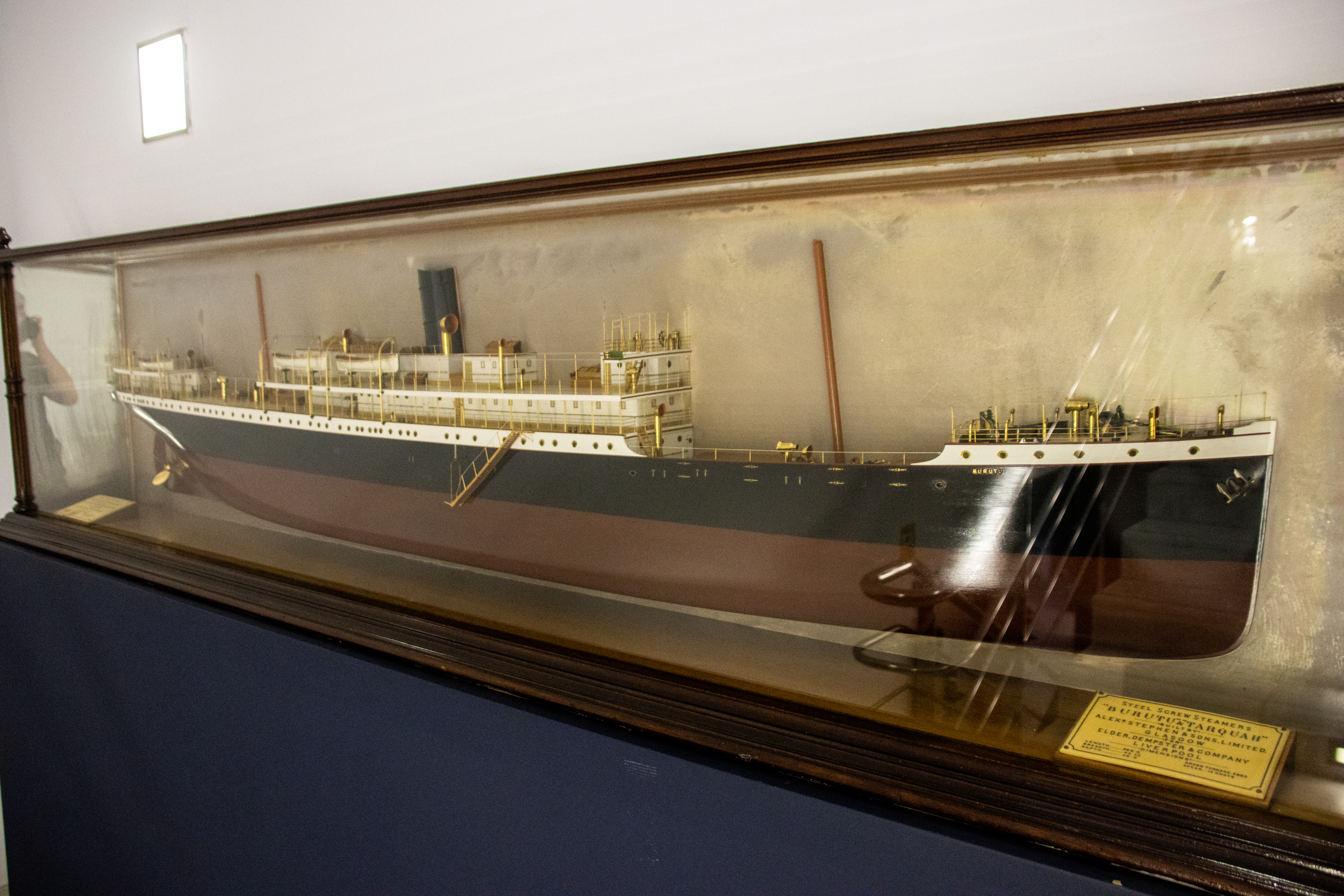
Model of Burutu at Elder Museum of Science and Technology

The 3,863 GRT ship was built by Alexander Stephen and Sons of Linthouse for the Elder Dempster Lines, and launched on 11 February 1902.

On 10 April 1918 the Burutu (which was defensively armed) was damaged by the German U-boat U-154. The U-boat was fought off by gunfire 14 miles south-south-west off Cape Mesurado in Liberia, West Africa. Two members of the Burutu's crew were killed. The Captain, H.A. Yardley, was awarded the Distinguished Service Order and Seaman Edward Jones was given a gold medal by the passengers. With the Burutu damaged, arrangements were made for a temporary refit in Freetown, Sierra Leone, and for the return of the vessel to Liverpool.

However, while in the Irish Sea, the 3,863 ton Burutu was struck on the port side by the stern of the 7,653 ton City of Calcutta, and is said to have sunk within ten minutes. About 160 persons, including the Master and officers and others on watch, lost their lives. The two vessels were travelling in separate convoys, and, in accordance with Admiralty orders, were steaming without lights. The collision took place at night in stormy weather.

Newspapers reported that there was a gale and a heavy sea at the time of the tragedy. The reports stated that there was perfect discipline aboard, and that the suddenness of the disaster and the hostile elements prevented lifesaving. Reports at the time indicated that there were 42 survivors and that although the first lifeboat escaped the second capsized. Survivors witnessed the crowded decks at the time the ship sank. All officers were lost.

A memorial is dedicated to the men who died and whose graves are not known or cannot be maintained in St Saviours church, Lagos, Nigeria.
