= German bombardment of Monrovia =

Event during World War I

- Part of African theatre of World War I
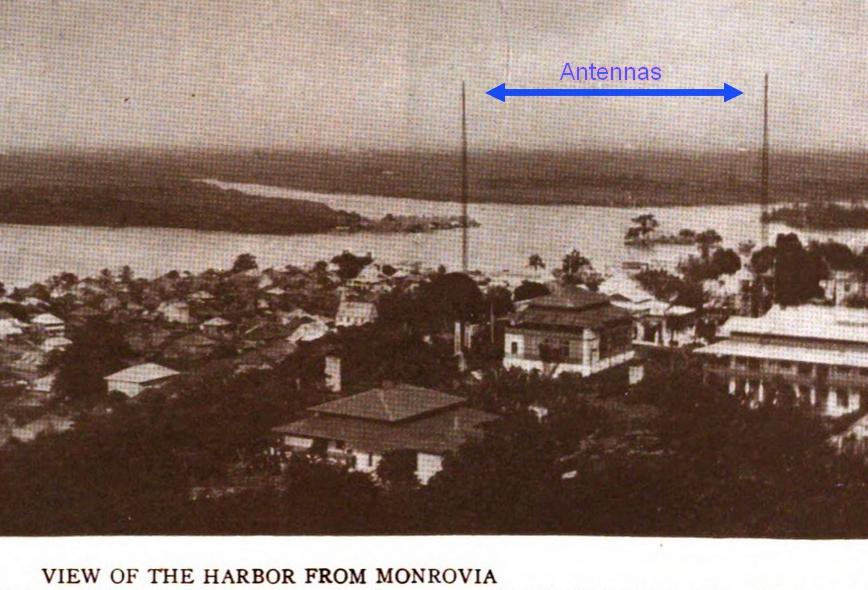
- View of Monrovia harbor in 1918. The antennas of the French radio station that was the target of the attack are labeled.
Date	9–10 April 1918
Location	Monrovia, Liberia
Result	• Destruction of a French radio station by a German submarine. • Destruction of several buildings in Monrovia. • Cessation of the bombardment due to the appearance of a British steamer.

Belligerents
Central Powers: German Empire	Allies: Liberia United Kingdom

Commanders and leaders
Hermann Gerke	Daniel Edward Howard (President of Liberia) Thomas J. R. Faulkner (Mayor of Monrovia)

Strength
1 submarine (U-154) with two 105 mm guns	Liberia; 1 armed schooner Lark; British Empire: 1 steamship (SS Burutu)

Casualties and losses
None	Liberia: 1 schooner (Lark/President Howard) sunk; 4-7 civilians killed in Monrovia; British Empire: SS Burutu damaged; 1 passenger killed, 1 boy drowned, 3 passengers injured

The German bombardment of Monrovia was an event that occurred during World War I. It started when the German submarine SM U-154 attacked Monrovia, the capital of Liberia. The German commander demanded that the Liberian government destroy the French wireless station in the city and haul down the French flag, but when his ultimatum was not fulfilled, the submarine began shelling the city. The French wireless station was destroyed and several shells fell in the center of Monrovia, causing several buildings to be destroyed and several residents to be killed. The eventual arrival of a British steamship saved the Liberian capital from destruction.

== Discussion of the threat ==
On 4 August 1917, Liberia declared war on Germany and joined the Allies. At the time, the German consul threatened that "a German submarine would pay a visit", but this was not taken seriously after Germany designated the entire Liberian coastline as a war zone. This meant they were therefore subject to attack Liberia's capital, Monrovia, as the city is located on the sea, making it particularly dangerous given the possibility of a German attack.

The Allied powers discussed the possible threat of submarine attack and the necessary fortification of the port of Monrovia at length. Discussions took place between American, British, French, and Liberian officials about the French wireless station at Monrovia and the appearance of German submarines off Dakar, which threatened the Liberian capital and its tiny navy. After Germany declared the entire Liberian coast a war zone in early 1918, the Americans and British made two immediate proposals to Liberia on the matter: to extinguish Monrovia's lighthouses at night and to arm the port with British artillery. Other proposals, including providing Liberia with four seaplanes, were discussed by American, British, and French representatives, but the governments ultimately settled on leaving the Liberian ports unprotected, as the Allies felt that the equipment they could provide would be inadequate and not worth the effort. Neither the French nor the British had the resources at the time to deploy ships, aircraft or gun batteries to adequately defend the Liberian coast. The British admiral commanding the West Africa Squadron stated that he considered an attack on Liberia unlikely.

== Appearance of the German submarine ==
Sources characterize the course of events differently. One version states that the German submarine SM U-154 arrived off the coast of Monrovia on the night of 9–10 April, unexpectedly for the Liberian government. In the morning, the German commander Hermann Gerke sent a boat to the capital with an ultimatum:

"I have no desire to cause further harm to the Liberian people, being convinced that you have been drawn into a war against your will and against your true interests. I therefore return to you the prisoners I took from your ship, the President Howard. At the same time I wish to draw your attention to the fact that the capital of Liberia is at present helpless under the German guns. Like many other allies of England and France, you are not receiving support from them at the moment of the most critical danger. If the wireless and cable stations of Monrovia do not immediately cease their work, I shall regret that I am forced to open fire on them. If you wish to avoid this, you will have to send me a vessel under a flag of truce and declare that you are willing to stop them yourself."

The President of Liberia, Daniel Edward Howard, easily recognized the submarine's guns, and decided to call an emergency meeting of his cabinet to consider the ultimatum with his vice president and some legislators before responding. The Liberian government was playing for time, and it was early in the morning, and perhaps the government needed time to call a formal meeting. They were unanimous in their decision: "...we must be loyal to our allies, regardless of the consequences to us". The President sent a message to Gerke, repeating much of what Gerke had said, and concluded: "I wish to assure you that I have taken the necessary steps to stop all wireless and cable station operations in this city." However, Gerke understood the answer to mean that the Liberians would not comply with his demand, but would not object if U-154 destroyed the station. He sent another letter to the President:

" (1) The French flag must be removed from its place shown to your commissioners. (2) All houses belonging to wireless and cable stations must be set on fire, the apparatus of each station must be destroyed."

Both demands were to be fulfilled "within one hour after your commissioners reach the shore". The demands were impossible to fulfill. The people were panic-stricken, but determined not to give in to threats.

He was rumoured to be demanding the surrender of all Americans, British, and French in Liberia. An unnamed British representative offered to agree to spare lives. At 2:00 p.m., President Howard sought a compromise. According to one version, he gave the order to lower the French flag, but asked that the radio and cable stations be shut down and closed by the Liberian government "in the presence of the Dutch Consul". Gercke did not believe this. According to another version, the Liberian government refused to destroy the station or leave the war. Gercke replied that he intended to destroy the station by gunfire. According to the statement of the German commander of SM U-153, "shortly before the expiration of the time the following morning a government launch brought an exact plan of the location of the radio station and consent to its destruction, which was followed." However, this does not fit with the fact that the submarine fired at the station not on the morning of the 11th, but starting at 16:00 on the 10th.

== Attack of a German submarine ==
=== Forces of the parties ===
The Liberian government had no way of resisting the attack. At the time, the Liberian navy consisted of one ship, which was all that was available for defense. But the Liberian navy was used primarily internally to transport soldiers, weapons and ammunition to the area of unrest to demonstrate the military power of the Liberian government to the native population, and not to defend the country from external attack. Monrovia was not fortified and had no military value. Considering that it was the capital of Liberia, this was an act of pure intimidation on the part of the Germans and a clear violation of international law.

The attacking submarine was the German submarine U-154 of the U-151 type. Built at the Flensburger Schiffbau shipyard and commissioned on 12 December 1917, under the command of Korvettenkapitän Hermann Gercke, U-154 was armed with 18 torpedoes and two 105-millimeter (4 in) deck guns. This submarine, with a displacement of 1,512 tons above water and 1,875 tons submerged, could reach speeds of 12.4 knots (23.0 km/h; 14.3 mph) on the surface.

=== Sinking of Liberian ship ===
Sources differ regarding the sinking of the Liberian ship. The Liberian ship (either named Lark or President Howard was either sunk and captured immediately after the submarine's arrival off the coast of Liberia, after which the ship's Liberian crew was sent ashore with demands to lower the French flag and destroy the French cable station, or the ship was sunk after refusing to comply. It is also possible that it was sunk during a bombardment of the capital, when the ship decided to intervene in defence of its country, at which point the submarine fired a torpedo that smashed and sank it. This was an immediate demonstration of the seriousness of the threat posed by Germany.

=== Bombardment of Monrovia ===
External image
- German U-boat shells Monrovia

The ultimatum expired at 16:00, and the submarine immediately began shelling. For an hour to an hour and a half the submarine bombarded the French wireless station, destroying it with about twenty shots. The German crew was not accurate in their shooting, and several shells fell in the center of Monrovia, destroying several buildings and killing several citizens. The submarine then spotted a British steamer and went in pursuit, leaving the wireless station and, apparently, part of Monrovia in wreckage. Had the bombardment continued, much of the city would have been destroyed. According to various estimates, four or seven people were killed, among the victims were young girls, an elderly man and children. Several houses were destroyed and various properties were damaged. It was the most brutal and dramatic moment of the First World War for Liberia. The amount of panic among the population that day in the capital was such that it has never been repeated in the history of Liberia.

=== Arrival of the British steamer ===
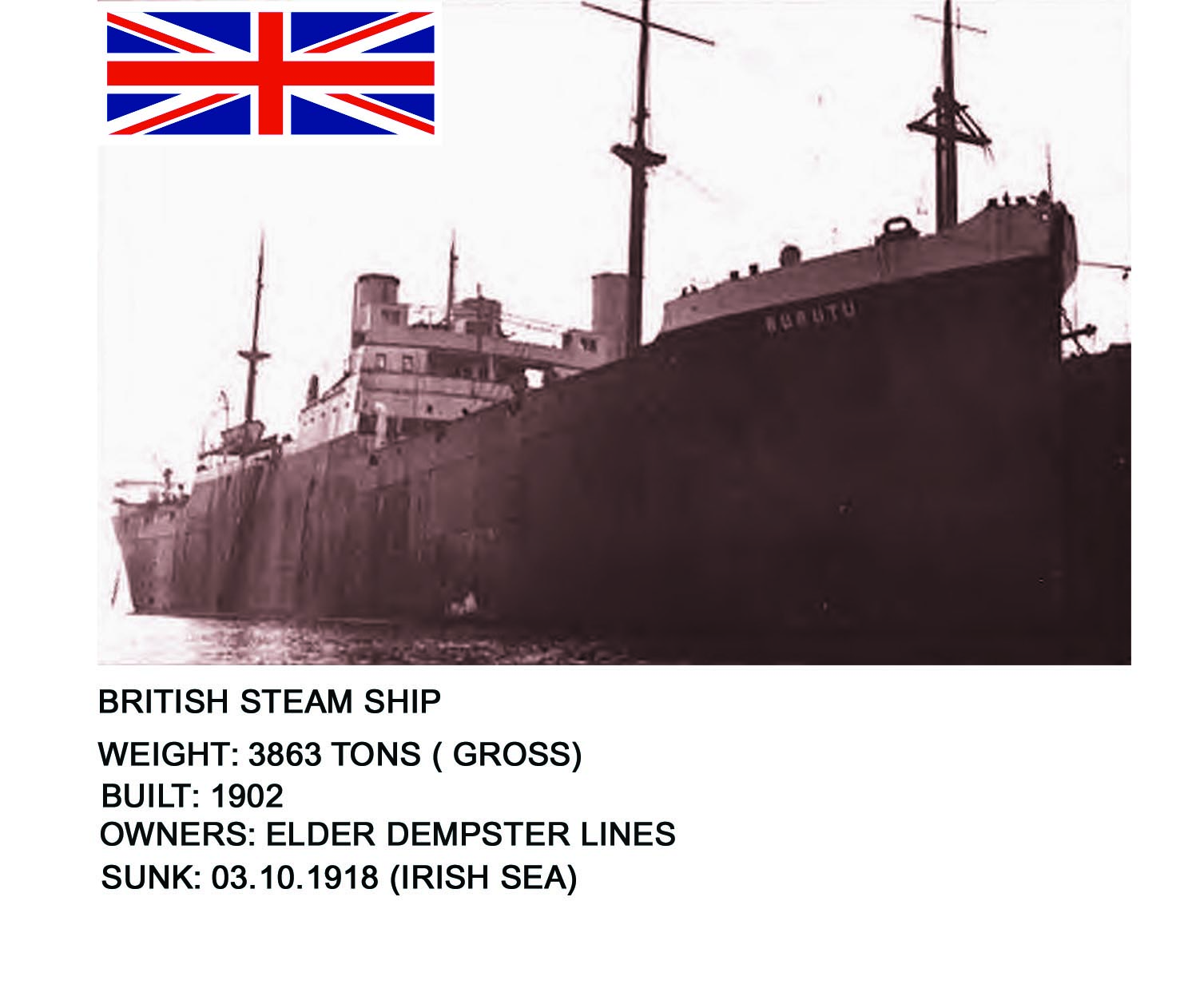
British steamship SS Burutu

The British consul was able to use the former German cable to make his report to Freetown:

"Due to the refusal of the Liberian Government to burn and destroy the French cable and wireless stations at Monrovia, a German submarine sank a Liberian merchant schooner with defensive armament on April 10th and bombarded Monrovia for an hour from 4pm, destroying the wireless station. Casualties: 3 children killed, 3 wounded. All Europeans rescued. The submarine ceased bombardment to attack a steamer bound for Sierra Leone. Both vessels were lost at dusk, the result of the attack is unknown. The submarine has announced its intention to resume bombardment today, Thursday [11th], to destroy the French cable station, so no further messages will be accepted."

"SS Burutu" was a British steamship carrying 75 tons of bullion, 110 passengers, a crew of 95 and 65 workmen. Alerted by a Liberian distress signal, she then headed for Liberia. U-154, spotting the passing steamer, went underwater to pursue, but after missing with a torpedo, the submarine "surfaced" to begin shelling the steamer. The steamer's wireless was destroyed by the first of sixty or seventy shells from the submarine. There was only one more hit, but it ripped open the hull and caused serious damage. One passenger was killed and three others were wounded. One boy jumped overboard and drowned. British Captain G. A. Yardley was awarded the Distinguished Service Order for his brave action against U-154. Timely British intervention forced the Germans to abandon their plans. The German submarine was finally torpedoed on 11 May 1918 in the Atlantic.

== Possibility of further attacks ==
After the battle, there was discussion of rebuilding the wireless station, although the American consul suggested that the Liberian government would prefer to leave it unrepaired, or at least rebuild it away from the coast to prevent another submarine attack. The British admiral of the West Africa Squadron also promised to keep several ships off Freetown, the capital of Sierra Leone, which could quickly reach Monrovia in the event of another attack.

In response to the German attack, the American cruiser USS Raleigh entered the mouth of the Mesurado River at Monrovia on 7 May 1918. The captain of Raleigh, Frank E. Ridgeley, went ashore to hold a conference with the president of Liberia and his government. President Howard declined Ridgeley's offer of a 127 mm (5 in) gun for the defense of the city, citing that it would be ineffective against the more powerful fire of a German submarine. But President Howard did accept his offer of 15,600 rounds of badly needed Krag–Jørgensen rifle ammunition, 15,600 rounds of Springfield 1901 rifle ammunition, and one Colt automatic machine gun.

After the battle, the country had no vessel to keep watch off its coast, except for British warships. To replace the sunken vessel, the President of the United States Woodrow Wilson ordered the Secretary of the Navy to sell Liberia the American ship USS Corona for next to nothing. The Secretary approved the sale, and the vessel was sold to Liberia, which was desperately needed to suppress possible rebellions.

In June, rumors were circulating in Monrovia: that Paris had fallen to the Germans, or that fifteen American troop transports had been sunk off the American coast, or that American troops would no longer be sent to Europe. On 21 June, the Entente countries proposed an idea: “It is believed that in order to calm the Liberian government, they could be informed that the submarine that fired on the French station was sunk by the navy on 11 May with all hands”.

== Consequences ==
This battle was the only one in which Liberia was involved in World War I. It was not positive for Monrovia and its people, and demonstrated the nation's weakness in the face of an imperial power. However, the Liberian government refused to submit to German demands, despite the damage to their capital. Liberian leaders, at least at the time, believed that participating in the war and staying on the side of the French-British Entente was the best way to advance and achieve their goals of international respect and support for national sovereignty. In this incident, the Liberian government was not simply acting as the United States or United Kingdom demanded, but on behalf of principles it believed in. U-154 became the first and last submarine to directly intimidate (de facto terrorize) the government of an entire enemy state.

The suffering and sacrifices of Liberia led American President Wilson in 1918 to promise a loan of $5,000,000 on the same principle as loans to other Allied countries. But President Wilson and the Democratic Party left power in 1921 before the loan was granted, and future Republican administrations failed to fulfill the previous president's promise.

The book "Autobiography of an African Princess" by Fatima Massaquoi references a song about this event, one line of which was: "O German Submarine, Aba; Come to bombard Monrovia, Aba." This song was performed to the music of the "sixteen steps" - a traditional Liberian dance.

== See also ==
- Liberia in World War I

== Literature ==
- Gillispie, William (2018). "Colonialism in global conflict: Liberia's entry and participation in World War One". First World War Studies. 9 (1): 111–129. doi:10.1080/19475020.2018.1520137. ISSN 1947-5020.
- Grant, Robert M. (2003). U-boat Hunters: Code Breakers, Divers and the Defeat of the U-boats, 1914-1918. Periscope Publishing Ltd. p. 182. ISBN 978-1-904381-15-0.
- Akingbade, Harrison (1978). "Liberia and the First World War 1914–1926". A Current Bibliography on African Affairs. 10 (3): 243–258. doi:10.1177/001132557801000303. ISSN 0011-3255.
- Shellum, Brian G. (2018). African American Officers in Liberia: A Pestiferous Rotation, 1910-1942. U of Nebraska Press. p. 304. ISBN 978-1-64012-065-5.
