= Elder Dempster Lines =

Shipping company

- House flag
- Industry: Shipping
- Predecessor: African Steamship Co Ltd
- Founded: 1868; 158 years ago
- Founders: Alexander Elder; John Dempster
- Defunct: 2000
- Fate: Wound up
- Headquarters: Liverpool, England
- Parent: Ocean Group plc
- Subsidiaries: Seaway Car Transporters Ltd

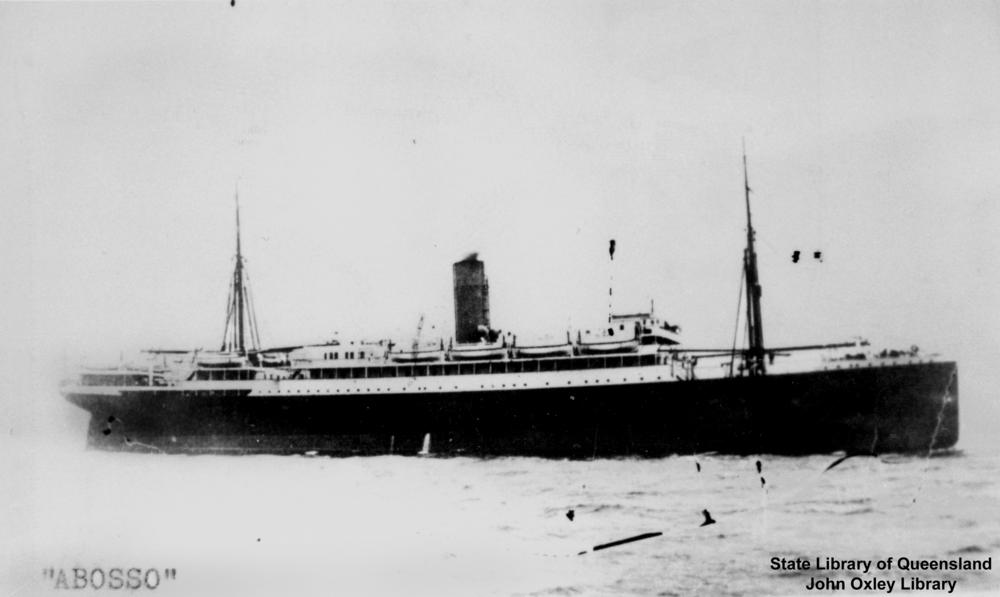
Abosso (7,782 GRT), built in 1912 and sunk by enemy action in 1917, killing 65 people

Elder Dempster Lines was a UK shipping company that traded from 1932 to 2000, but had its origins in the mid-19th century.

== Founders ==
=== Alexander Elder ===
Alexander Elder was born in Glasgow in 1834. He was the son of David Elder, who for many years was manager of Robert Napier and Sons, the engine and shipbuilders and the brother of John Elder.

Alexander Elder was chief engineer of Columbian, a 2,180 GRT iron-hulled barque with a 2,116 ihp engine. She was built for the Australian run, and was chartered by France in 1855 as a troop ship for the Crimean War.

In 1856 Alexander Elder joined W and H Laird as superintendent engineer for the African Steamship Company.

=== John Dempster ===
John Dempster was born in 1837 in Penport, Thornhill, Dumfriesshire where his father, William Dempster, was builder to the Duke of Buccleuch. The Dempster family moved to Birkenhead in the 1840s and John joined W and H Laird as a clerk in 1851 when he was aged 14.

== History ==
=== Elder Dempster and Company ===
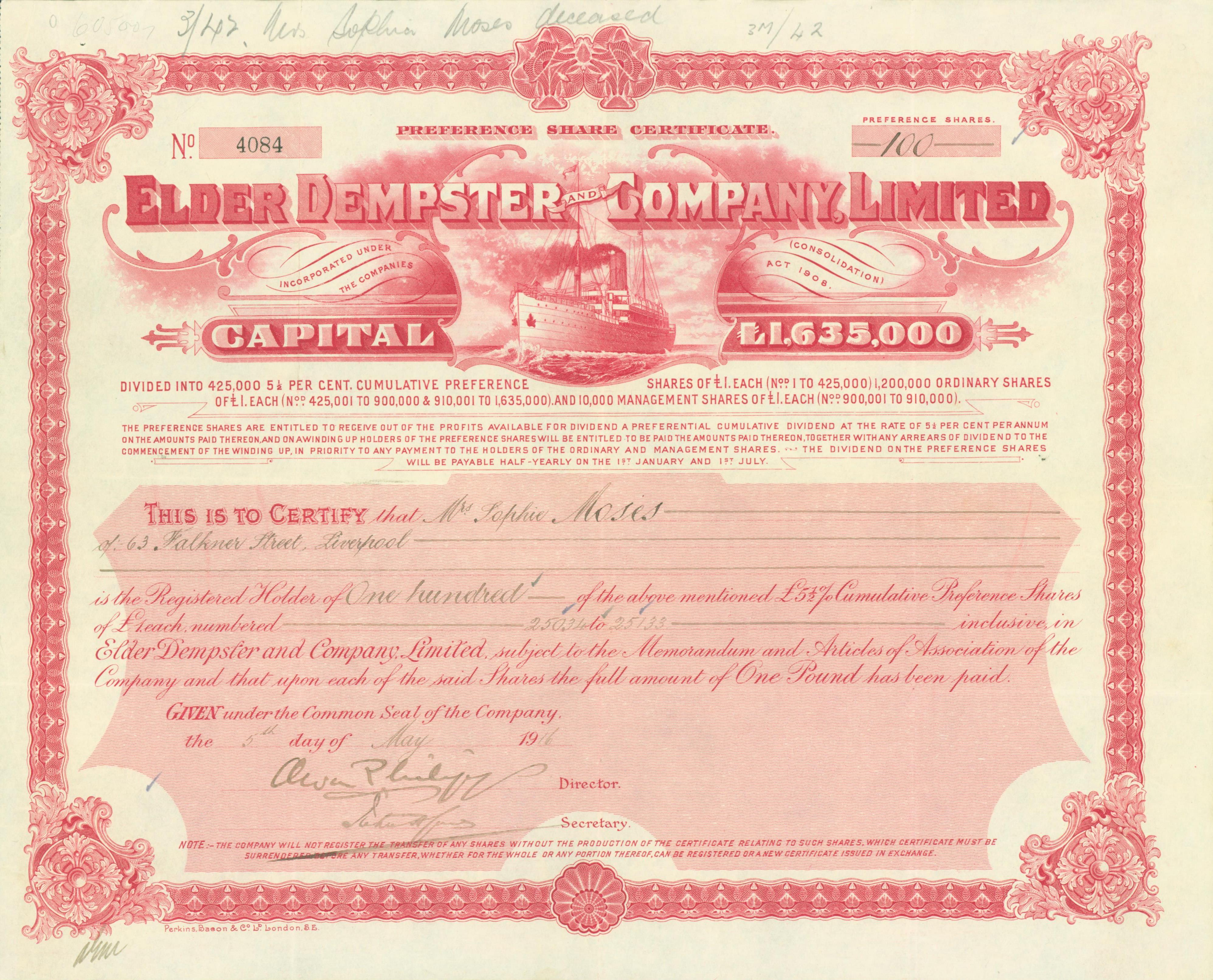
Share of the Elder Dempster and Company, Ltd, issued 5 May 1916

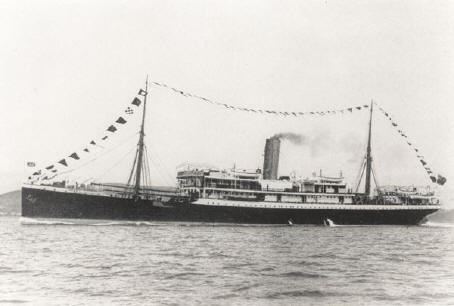
Mendi (4,222 GRT), built in 1905 and sunk in a wartime collision in 1917, killing 646 people

Elder Dempster and Company began its commercial activities on 1 October 1868, when John Dempster made it his business to circularise all potential customers:

"I beg to inform you that this Company intend to dispatch, early in January next, the first of their line of Steamers, at present being constructed on the Clyde for trading between Glasgow, Liverpool and the West Coast of Africa.
"The Steamers are to sail monthly, and the ports which it is intended shall be called at are Sierra Leone, Cape Palmas, Cape Coast Castle, Accra, Lagos, Benin Bonny, Old Calabar and Fernando Po, but should sufficient inducement offer, arrangements will be made for their calling at other ports, either on the outward or homeward voyages. The Steamers are being specially built for the African Trade and, besides being comfortably fitted up for passengers, they will have extensive cargo space, which will enable them to carry rough goods at moderate rates."

=== Elder Dempster Shipping Limited ===
Elder Dempster Shipping Limited was formed in 1899. Among their ships were the liner SS Monterey and the steamer SS Montezuma, which in early 1900 were both chartered as transport ships for British troops destined for South Africa during the Second Boer War.

In 1900 they established a direct steamship service between the United Kingdom and the West Indies.

=== Elder Dempster Lines ===
In 1932, Elder Dempster Shipping Ltd, together with the African Steamship Company, and the British & African Steam Navigation Company, came under the Elder Dempster Lines name.

The company operated from British ports, mainly Liverpool, where it was based, to West African destinations. It ran numerous cargo ships and a small number of passenger liners. Before the Second World War its passengers liners were Accra and Apapa, built in 1926 and 1927, plus its flagship Abosso (11,330 GRT) which was launched in 1935. In the Second World War the company lost a number of ships to enemy action, including both Accra and Apapa in 1940 and Abosso in 1942. However, during the war its passenger services continued to run between Liverpool and West Africa, escorted by British submarines. Among its passengers were students from British colonies such as the Gold Coast and Nigeria awarded imperial scholarships to study at Oxford and Cambridge universities, such as the Gold Coast student PK Owusu, on his way to study English literature at Queens College, Cambridge in 1944.

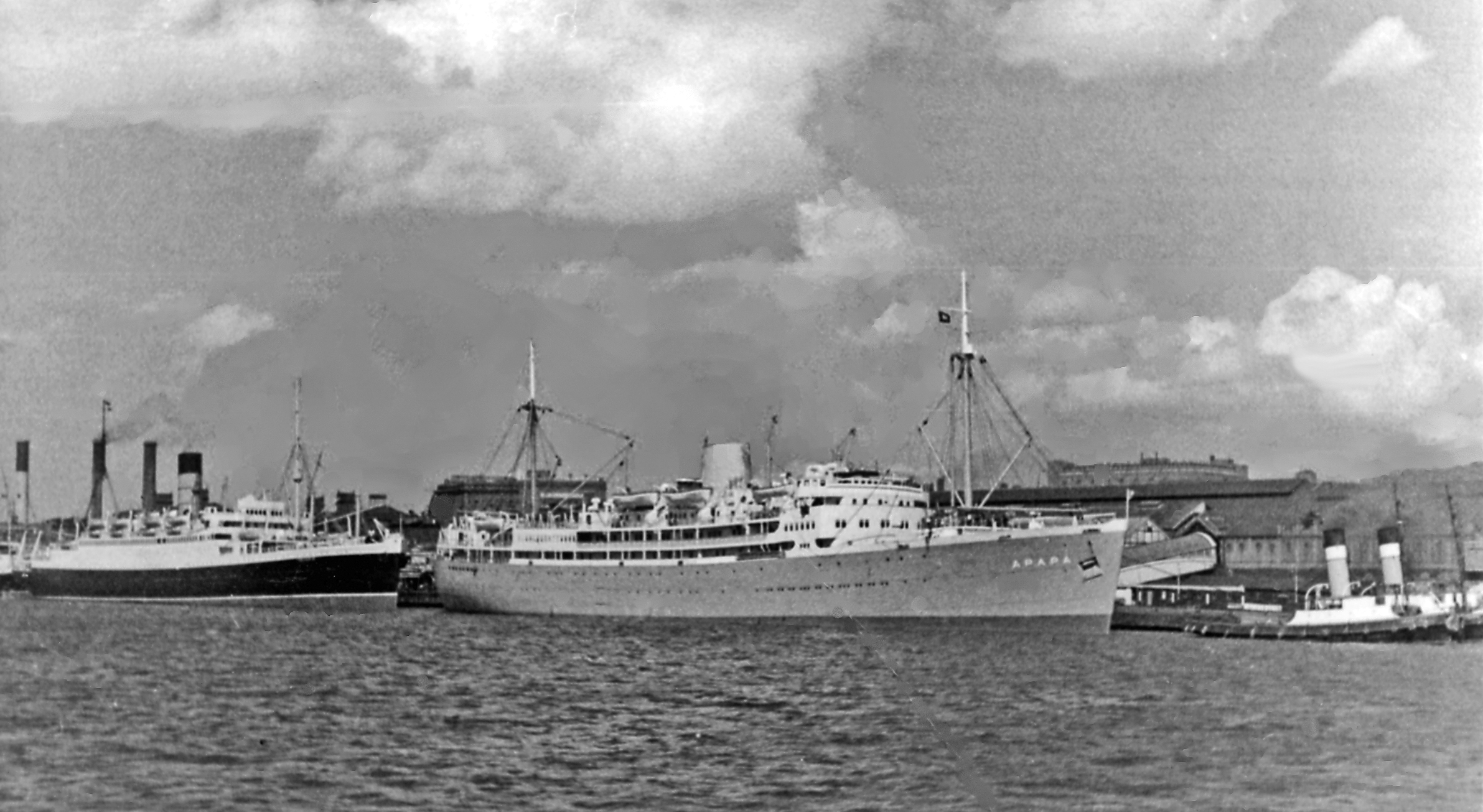
Apapa (11,651 GRT), built in 1948 to replace an earlier Apapa sunk in 1940

After the war a new Accra and Apapa were launched in 1947 and 1948, followed by a new flagship, Aureol (14,083 GRT) in 1951, for the company's services to Ghana and Nigeria.

The company expanded, taking over a number of other shipping companies between 1951 and 1965, one of which was British & Burmese Steam Navigation Co Ltd which was purchased in 1952. The chartered ships were retained on the West Africa routes while P. Henderson & Co. continued to manage the Burma traders. In 1967 the six day war closed the Suez Canal causing Henderson's service to Burma ceased and their last three ships transferred to Elder Dempster routes.

When the Nigerian National Shipping Line was formed in 1957, Elder Dempster took a 33 per cent stake, selling in 1961 to the Nigerian government.

=== Ocean Fleets ===
In 1965 the company came under the ownership of the Ocean Steamship Company (Blue Funnel Line).

By 1970 all stock in the former Shaw, Savill & Albion Line had been transferred to Elder Dempster.

=== Delmas-Vieljeux ===
The end for the Elder Dempster Lines name came in 1989 when it was bought by the French firm Delmas-Vieljeux, although the company continued as a shipping agents until 2000 when it was wound up.

=== Non-shipping interests ===
At the end of the 19th century the company had been instrumental in forming the Bank of British West Africa (renamed the Bank of West Africa in the 1950s, and subsequently acquired by the Standard Bank).

From 1935 to 1940 the company jointly operated Elders Colonial Airways based in Nigeria, together with Imperial Airways, for passengers within West Africa. The onset of WWII saw the end of this joint venture. At the height of its power it controlled the lands from Ijora-Olopa to Apapa in Nigeria's Lagos port area, the Nigerian Ports Authority grew out of the structure created by Elder Dempster.

British Railways Merchant Navy Class steam locomotive 35030 was named Elder-Dempster Line after the company.

== Involvement in the Belgian Congo ==
In the late 19th century Dempster held a shipping contract with King Leopold II to ship goods and supplies to and from the Congo Free State. E. D. Morel, the main activist in the movement to expose the abuses of Leopold in his private colony, first realized the discrepancy in value trade goods being sent to the Congo while working for Dempster. As much as 80 per cent of the goods being shipped to the Congo on Dempster ships were ammunition and other weapons. From this shipping information Morel deduced the extremely aggressive tactics being used by Leopold.

== Notable litigation ==
Elder Dempster have been party to numerous cases which have later become a significant part of English common law precedent, particularly in contract law and maritime law. Such cases include Elder Dempster v. Paterson, Zochonis, Elder Dempster v Dunn & Co, Elder Dempster Lines v Zaki Ishag, and Rudd v Elder Dempster.

== In popular culture ==
The 1960 song "My Old Man's a Dustman" by Lonnie Donegan derived in part from an earlier song with the lyric "My old man's a fireman on the Elder Dempster line." In the 1950 film Waterfront, the character played by Robert Newton sings "My old man's a fireman on Elder Dempster boat" as he abandons his family for the sea, his daughter pleading with him to answer whether the Elder Dempster office is where her mother should go for their non-existent pay allotment.

== Legacy ==
The Elder Museum of Science and Technology on Gran Canaria in the Canary Islands takes its name from a building once owned by Elder Dempster Lines.

== Bibliography ==
- Bolaji, Akinola (2012). Arrested Development: A journalist's account of how the growth of Nigeria's shipping sector is impaired by politics and inconsistent policies. Bloomington: Authorhouse. ISBN 978-1477238202.
- Cowden, James (1981). The Price of Peace: Elder Dempster 1939–1945. Jocast. ISBN 0950748005.
- Cowden, James; Duffy, John (1986). The Elder Dempster Fleet History 1852–1985. Mallett and Bell. ISBN 0950945315.
- Davies, Peter N (1973). The Trade Makers: Elder Dempster in West Africa 1872–1972. London: George Allen and Unwin. ISBN 0043870031.
- Davies, Peter N (2000). The Trade Makers: Elder Dempster in West Africa 1872–1972 1973–1989. International Maritime Economic History Association. ISBN 0968128890.
- Dockray, Martin (2004). Cases and Materials on the Carriage of Goods by Sea. London: Routledge-Cavendish. ISBN 978-1859417966.
- Harnack, Edwin P (1938) [1903]. All About Ships & Shipping (7th ed.). London: Faber and Faber.
- Harnack, Edwin P (1964) [1903]. All About Ships & Shipping (11th ed.). London: Faber and Faber.
- Haws, Duncan (1990). Elder Dempster Lines. Merchant Fleets. Vol. 20. TCL Publications. ISBN 0946378177.
- Hochschild, Adam (1999). King Leopold's Ghost. London: Pan Books. ISBN 0-330-49233-0.
- Peel, Edwin (2011). Treitel's The Law of Contract (13th ed.). London: Sweet and Maxwell. ISBN 978-1847039217.
- Sauvant, Karl Peter; Mallampally, Padma; Dunning, John H, eds. (1993). Transnational corporations in services. London: Routledge. ISBN 0-415-08559-4.
