= Palestine Airways =

Zionist-founded airline of British Palestine

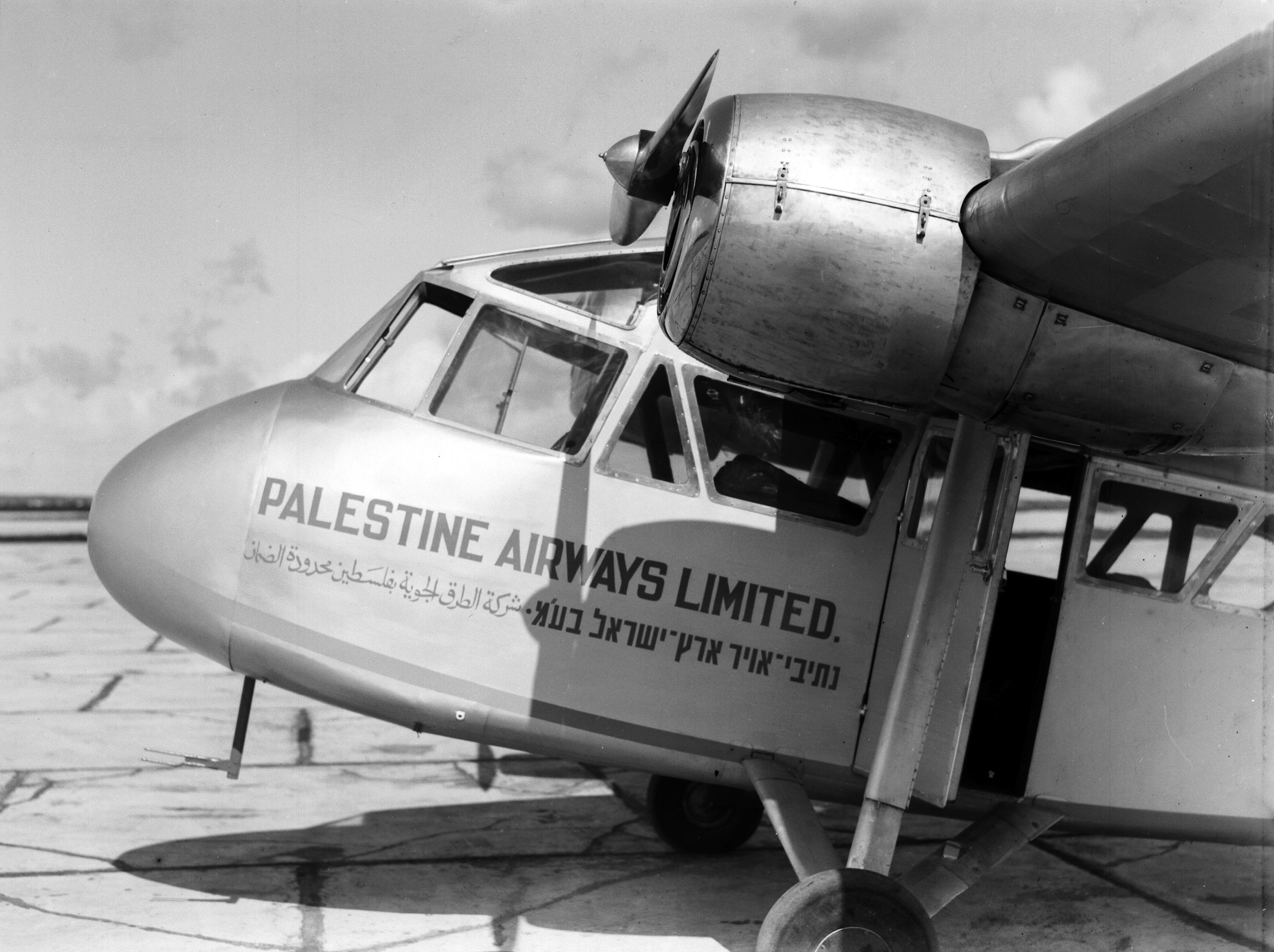
Palestine Airways airplane

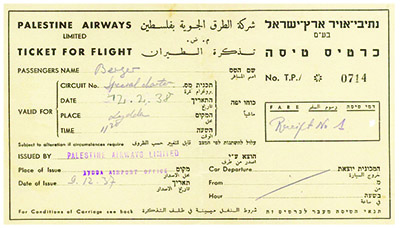
Palestine Airways ticket, 1937

Palestine Airways (Hebrew: נתיבי אוויר ארץ ישראל, romanized: Netivéy Avír Éretz Yisraél, lit. 'Land of Israel Airways'; Arabic: شركة الطرق الجوية بفلسطين, romanized: Šarikat aṭ-Ṭuruq al-Jawwiyya bi-Filasṭīn, lit. 'Airline Company in Palestine') was an airline founded by Zionist Pinhas Rutenberg in British Palestine, in conjunction with the Histadrut and the Jewish Agency. In 1937 the airline was taken over by British Government's Air Ministry, with the intention of it eventually being transferred back into private hands.

Between July 1937 and August 1940, it operated under the aegis of the British corporation Imperial Airways. Throughout these years, Palestine Airways flew thousands of passengers, its best year being 1938 with 6400 passengers.

== History ==
The airline was registered as a private aviation company on 18 December 1934, with assistance from Imperial Airways whose crew piloted and serviced the aircraft and handled passenger check-in. Based in Haifa, on 11 August 1937 it commenced commercial flights 3 times a week to Lydda. This line operated for several months, but was discontinued when Arab hostilities worsened, and the danger to passengers travelling from Tel Aviv, the main Jewish population centre, to Lydda Airport through Arab majority territory overland, became too great In 1938 Palestinian Airways moved its main base to the newly built Tel Aviv Airport (in 1940 renamed Sde Dov) and commenced operations on the Tel Aviv to Haifa route, flying twice a day in their de Havilland Rapide. From September 1938, the route was extended from Haifa to Beirut.

Palestine Airways ceased operations in August 1940 when its aircraft were taken over by the RAF for use in the war effort as transport and communication aircraft.

== Aircraft ==
Initially in July 1937 the airline flew two twin-engine, five seat, cantilever Short Scion monoplanes. In 1938 two additional aircraft were acquired: an eight-seat de Havilland Dragon Rapide and a ten-seat Short Scion Senior landplane version of the float-plane (which later in Royal Air Force service was lost in action on 22 September 1943). The larger aircraft were used for the service to Larnaca and charter flights to Egypt.

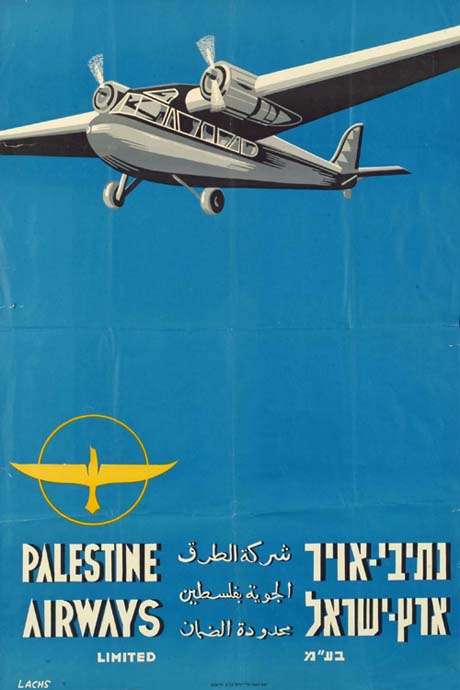
Advertising poster
