= Elders Colonial Airways =

Airline based in Nigeria, operated between 1935-1940

Elders Colonial Airways was an airline based in Lagos, Nigeria, and was an associate of Imperial Airways. The airline operated from 1935 to 1940.

== History ==
=== Background ===
In 1932 Imperial Airways began operating a weekly flight from England to South Africa, and the flight served numerous cities throughout Africa on its route. An increase in traffic numbers saw the flight being operated twice weekly from January 1935, and it was at this time that the airline completed negotiations with the Air Ministry for the creation of a route from Khartoum in Anglo-Egyptian Sudan to Nigeria. It was intended for the flights to terminate in Lagos, but because there were no airports which were suitable for operations, the flights terminated in Kano, and passengers connected to Lagos by train. Imperial Airways required an airline to operate between Kano and the Elder Dempster Lines docks at Takoradi in the Gold Coast.

To this end, Imperial Airways (Nigeria and Gold Coast) Limited was jointly formed between Imperial and Elder Dempster on 7 November 1935, and it was operated as Elders Colonial Airways. Imperial Airways owned a half stake in the company and supplied all aircraft and personnel. It was planned for Elders Colonial services to run so they would connect with the arrival and departure of both Elder Dempster ships and Imperial's flights, allowing for quick distribution of passengers and mail throughout the Gold Coast and Nigeria.

=== Operational years ===
On 13 October 1937 flights on the route from Lagos-Accra were commenced utilising a de Havilland Express from Imperial Airways. It was reported that traffic on the route was held back by health issues, but Imperial Airways overcame these concerns by installing an apparatus capable of killing mosquitoes in the aircraft. A weekly service in conjunction with Imperial from Freetown to Bathurst was commenced on 25 June 1938 with Short Scion Senior, and was operated via Conakry, Bolama and Bissau. The Lagos-Takoradi route was started on 4 April 1939, whilst on 15 July 1939 the Freetown-Bathurst service was terminated. Following the August 1939 sinking of one of the airline's Short Scion Senior aircraft whilst at anchor in Bathurst, all services to Bathurst were halted.

With the onset of World War II, Elders Colonial Airways ceased operations on 14 June 1940, and after the war services did not resume: rather flights were replaced by the West African Airways Corporation.
