= Elder Museum of Science and Technology =

Museum in Las Palmas, Canary Islands

- Museo Elder de la Ciencia y la Tecnología
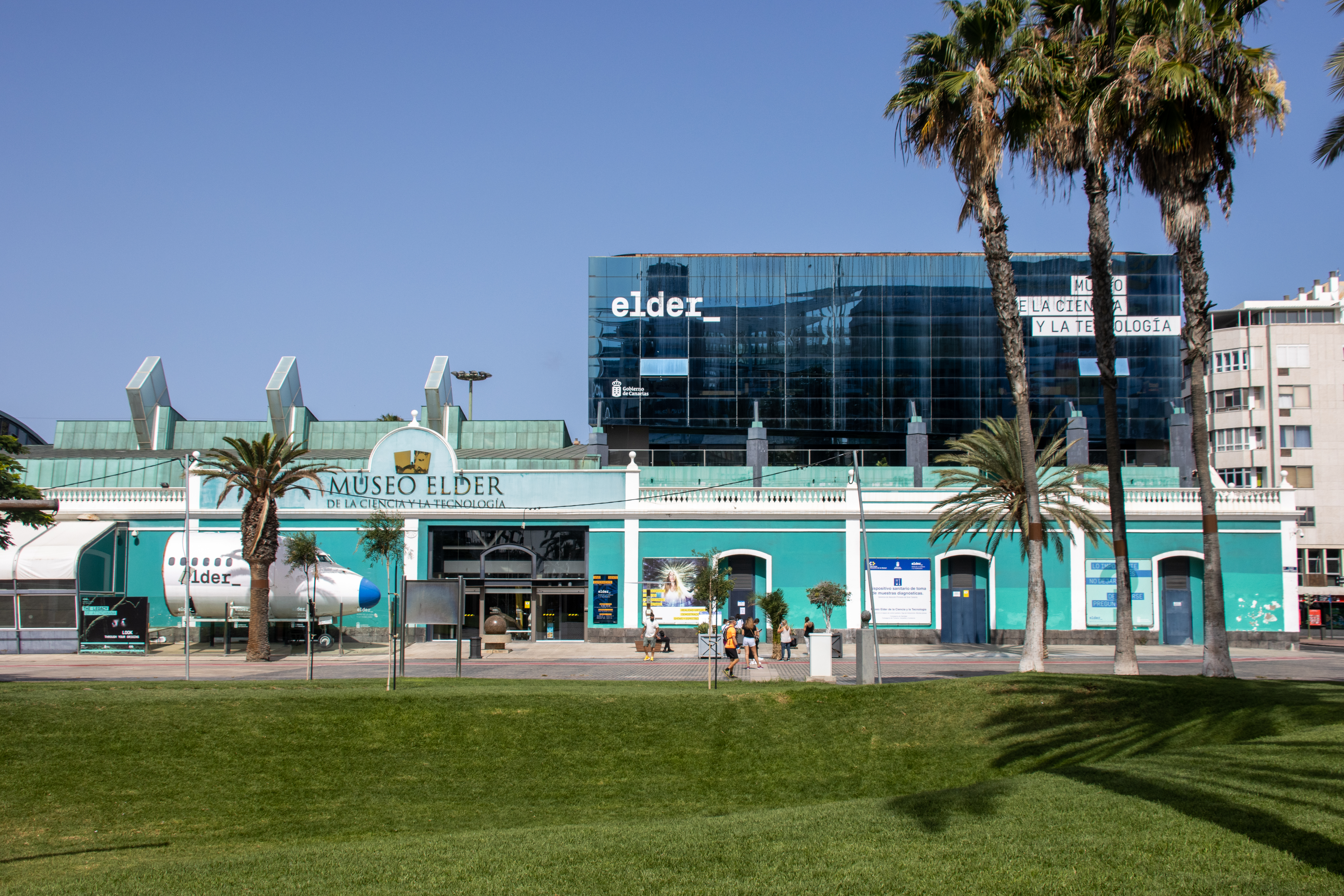
- The Elder Museum

- Location within Canary Islands
- Established: 1999; 27 years ago
- Location: Parque Santa Catalina; Las Palmas; Gran Canaria; Spain
- Coordinates: 28°08′28″N 15°25′47″W
- Website: www.museoelder.org

The Elder Museum of Science and Technology (Spanish: Museo Elder de la Ciencia y la Tecnología) is a museum in Las Palmas de Gran Canaria, the capital city of Gran Canaria, in the Canary Islands.

== History ==
The museum takes its name from the shipping company Elder Dempster Lines, the original owners of the building in which the museum is now housed. Elder Dempster Lines was founded in 1878 by two Scottish shipping entrepreneurs, Alexander Elder (brother of the shipbuilder John Elder) and John Dempster, and the company used to transport bananas from Gran Canaria to Britain. The Elder Museum took over the building and opened to the public in December 1999.

== Collections ==
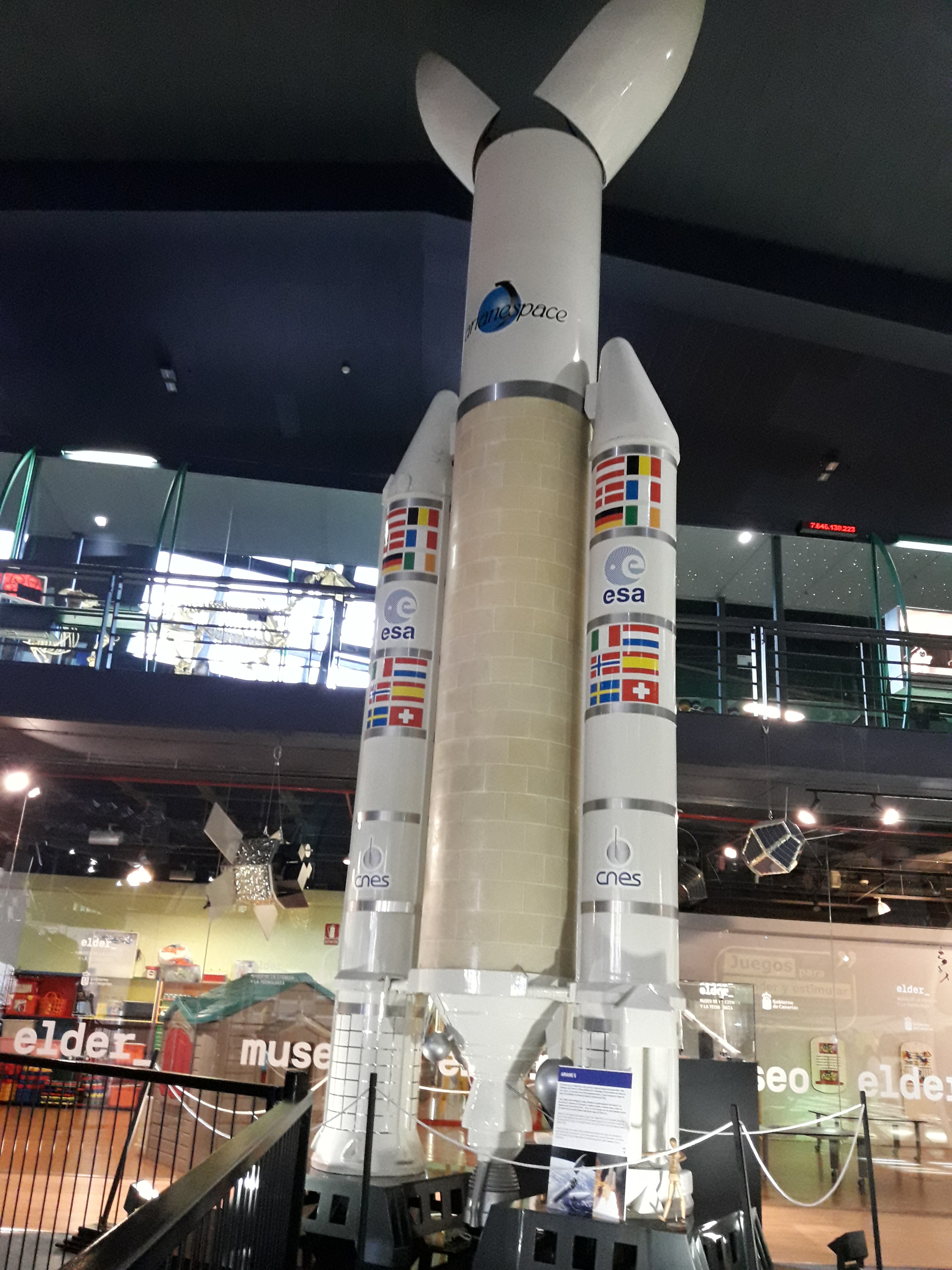
Ariane 5 rocket on display in the Elder

The museum displays are on four floors, with exhibitions of technology, physics, mathematics, geology, biology, medicine and astronomy, with a digital planetarium. Among the items on display there are models of steamships and a marine diesel engine, a Northrop F-5 fighter jet plane, a greenhouse ecosystem and a "Robocoaster". A steam locomotive dating from 1885 is displayed near the cafeteria. In 2017 the museum unveiled a scale model of the European Solar Telescope which is planned to be built on La Palma. A new Science and Research room was also opened in 2017.

The museum encourages hands-on interaction with the displays, and notices around the galleries humorously that it is forbidden not to touch the exhibits.
