= Liberia in World War I =

Liberia remained neutral for the first years of World War I. On 4 August 1917, in the wake of the declaration of war upon the German Imperial Government by the United States of America (6 April 1917), Liberia joined the Allied side, and is counted amongst the war's victors.

== Background ==
Prior to World War I, Liberia was largely impoverished and unstable, and dependent on Germany for around 75% of its foreign trade. The start of the war caused a drop in German trade, with resulting severe effects on the Liberian economy. Although the start of the war globally prevented Liberia from acquiring weapons, the American government consented to sell the Liberians arms at half-price, enabling the Liberian Frontier Force to keep down local insurrections.

== Participation ==
Following the outbreak of war, the German trade collapsed. Germany maintained a telegraph station until Liberia declared war on it on 4 August 1917. At that point, the station's garrison was deported.

Liberia had minimal active involvement in the war itself. Monrovia suffered shellings by a German submarine in April 1918, and once more in June 1918 – targeting their former telegraph station – and a small number of Liberian troops served in France, though they did not see combat.

In April 1918 the Liberian government seized German assets in the country, resulting in yet further economic disruption, particularly as German companies had displaced Liberian businesses in the local economy; this was further exacerbated by a German submarine blockade affecting Liberian ship traffic.

As an Allied nation, Liberia received liberty loans from the United States, though this financial support decreased greatly after the end of the war. A loan to "bolster and replace" profits lost as a result of Liberia's involvement was proposed by President Woodrow Wilson, but blocked by the United States Senate.

== See also ==
- Liberia in World War II
- German bombing of Monrovia
