= Rochester Airport (Kent) =

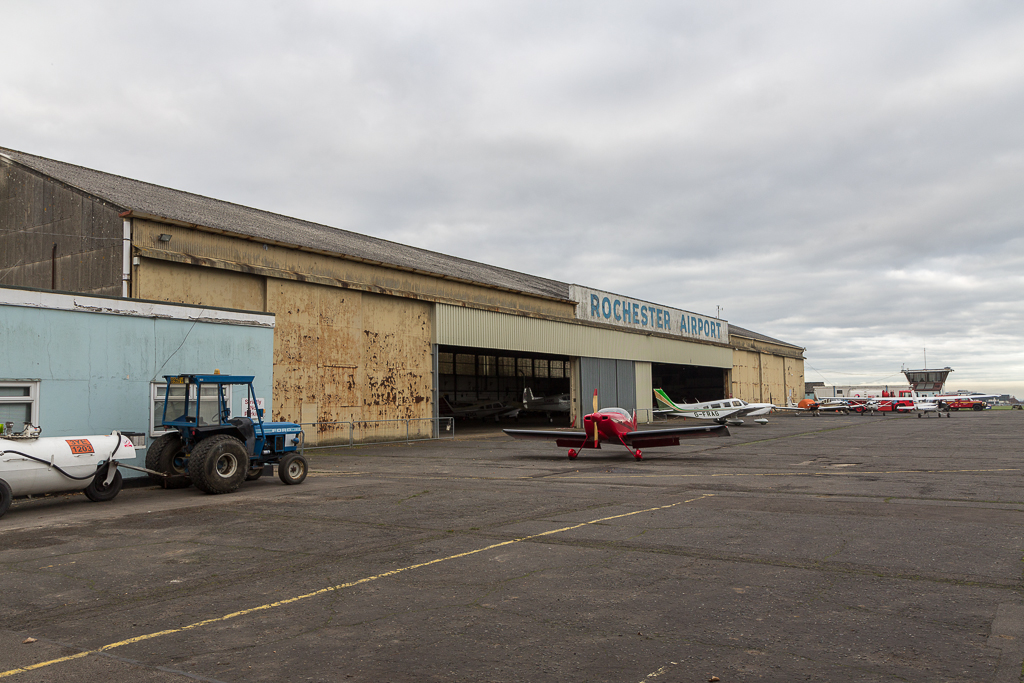
- Hangar at Rochester Airport
- IATA: RCS; ICAO: EGTO

Summary
- Airport type: Private Aircraft Storage
- Owner: Medway Council
- Operator: Rochester Airport Ltd.
- Location: Rochester, Medway
- Elevation AMSL: 426 ft (130 m)
- Coordinates: 51°21′07″N 000°30′10″E
- Website: www.rochesterairport.co.uk

Map
- Location in Kent

Runways
Direction	Length		Surface
Direction	m	ft	Surface
02L/20R	830	2,723	Grass
02R/20L	684	2,244	Grass
- Sources: UK AIP at NATS

Rochester Airport (IATA: RCS, ICAO: EGTO) also known as Rochester Airfield, is a operational general aviation airport located 1.5 nautical miles (2.8 km; 1.7 mi) south of Rochester in South East England, with the River Medway 1.5 NM (2.8 km; 1.7 mi) from the end of runway 34, 3.4 mi (5.5 km) from Chatham and its Historic Dockyard and the Medway area.

Rochester Aerodrome has a CAA Ordinary Licence (Number P846) that allows flights for the public transport of passengers or for flying instruction as authorised by the licensee (Rochester Airport PLC). The airfield currently has no scheduled flights, and is only used to store privately owned aircraft in a cram hangar.

== 1933-1945 ==
Rochester City Council compulsorily purchased the land at Rochester Airfield in September 1933 from the landowner as the site for a municipal airport. One month later Short Brothers, who had started building aircraft in 1909 on the Isle of Sheppey, asked for permission to lease the land for test flying and thus began the privileged relationship between the local authority and the aviation industry. The inaugural flight into Rochester was from Gravesend, with John Parker flying their Short Scion, G-ACJI, powered by Pobjoy engines. Civilian services started with flights from Rochester to Southend Airport in June 1934 at a cost of 12 shillings (60p) for the return trip.

In 1934-5 Short Brothers took over the Rochester Airport site when they moved some of their personnel from the existing seaplane works. Pobjoy Airmotors Ltd moved to Rochester at the same time to be closer to Short Brothers, to whom they were contracted for production of aircraft engines for the Short Scion. Financial difficulties led to a capital investment by Shorts in Pobjoy and the eventual assimilation of Pobjoy. The Air Ministry licensed Short Brothers in 1936 to design and build a four-engined high-wing monoplane. An initial half-scale model S3, serial M4, flew at Rochester on 19 September 1938. The first prototype S29 came out of its hangar on 14 May 1939. The flight was perfect but the landing gear collapsed on touch down. Later developments led to the first 4-engined heavy bomber to serve in the Royal Air Force, the Short S.29 Stirling. Short Brothers continued to build seaplanes on the Esplanade at Rochester supplying the growing market for flying boats.

In 1938, No. 23 Elementary and Reserve Flying Training School RAF (No. 26 Group RAF) came to Rochester. No 1 hangar was built for the RAF and for the Royal Navy and to house Avro Tutors. The school was managed by Shorts and they still exist fronting the Maidstone Road. Rochester airport was bombed heavily during the war by a wing of Dornier Do 17s on 15 August 1940. Many 100 lb (45 kg) bombs scored hits on the factory and the runways. Spitfires of No. 54 Squadron RAF from RAF Hornchurch successfully intercepted some of the marauders. Stirling production was put back by at least a year and in the end was dispersed to other parts of the country as well as Rochester.

The following units were also here at some point:

- No. 16 Group Communication Flight RAF (September 1939 - June 1941 & January 1945 - March 1946)
- No. 24 Elementary Flying Training School RAF (March 1946 - April 1947) became No. 24 Reserve Flying School RAF (May 1947 - March 1953)
- No. 168 Gliding School RAF (January 1945 - June 1949)

== Post War ==
Shorts concentrated their work in Belfast, leaving the Medway towns in 1946. For six years 1947-53 the RAF 24 Elementary Flying School Training School was transferred to Rochester and was renamed "Reserve Flying School". The unit was disbanded in 1953. Previous employees of Shorts joined the Shorts gliding club at Rochester and developed a prototype aircraft called the "Nimbus", in an attempt to keep aircraft production at Rochester.

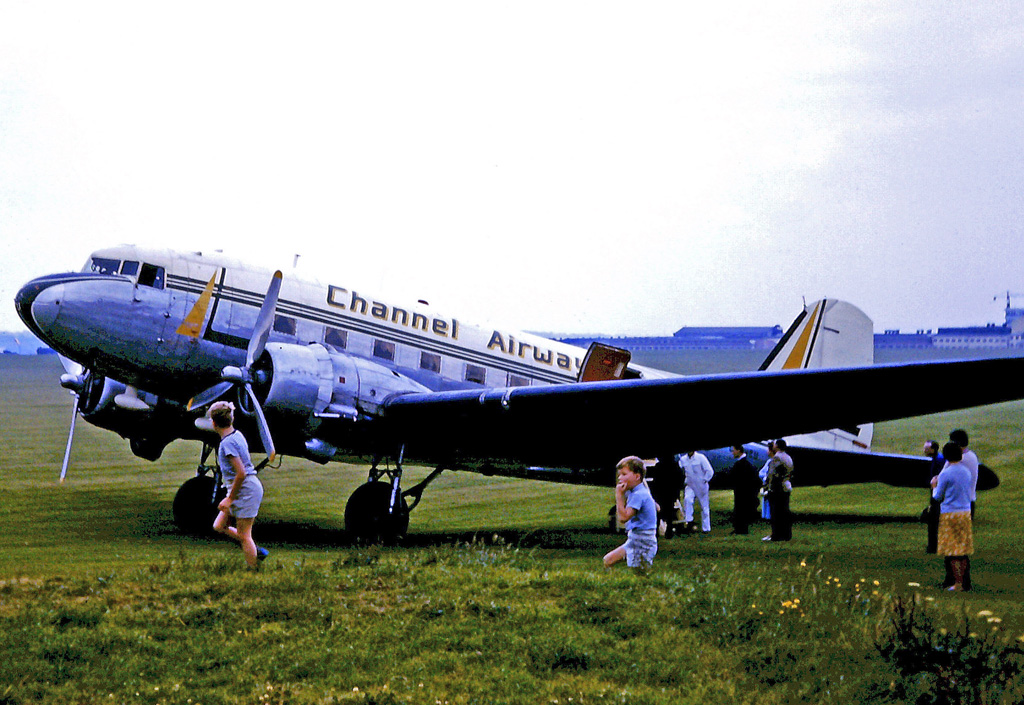
Channel Airways Douglas DC-3 at Rochester when operating a scheduled flight to the Channel Islands in 1965

Passenger flights to and from the continent expanded in the 1950s and 60's using Douglas DC-3s (Dakotas) and de Havilland Doves operated by Channel Airways but with stringent requirement of the Civil Aviation Authority, operators had to re-locate from Rochester.

In 1979 the lease reverted to the council and after giving thorough consideration to closing the airport the General Electric Company plc comprising Marconi Electronic Systems and instrument makers Elliott Automation decided to take over management of the airport maintaining two runways as grass whilst releasing some land for light industrial expansion.

In 1999 a group of aviators and local businessmen at Rochester formed a company dedicated to the preservation and promotion of the long tradition of aviation at Rochester Airport, its service to the local community and for its longer-term preservation. The historic site of Rochester Airport was saved from closure for the short term by the efforts of this group of local business people, in the face of pressure by the Labour controlled Local Council to re-zone the airport site as Industrial Development land. Rochester Airport plc, proposed to continue operation of the airport even though the timescale given for takeover was minuscule. They want to continue, as far as possible, the existing services provided for private, business and emergency aviation services and enhance them to bring increased economic benefit to Medway, its surrounding area, its businesses and its community. Significant voluntary work has contributed to the financial viability of Rochester Airport which has been operated on a care and maintenance basis in light of the difficulty in securing a proper lease. The airport now had a five-year lease, outside of the Landlord and Tenant Act 1954, which expired in January 2009, and entered a crucial phase of negotiation with Medway Council.

On 13 January 2009 a fresh lease, with conditions, was granted to Rochester Airport Operating company. This length of lease is still insufficient to attract any real investment and, although the years of decay have been halted, no real improvements are financially possible for the benefit of the airport's users. 90% of the Microlight fleet relocated to Damyns Hall Aerodrome near Upminster. One of the long-established flight schools has gone into administration.

== 2010 onwards ==
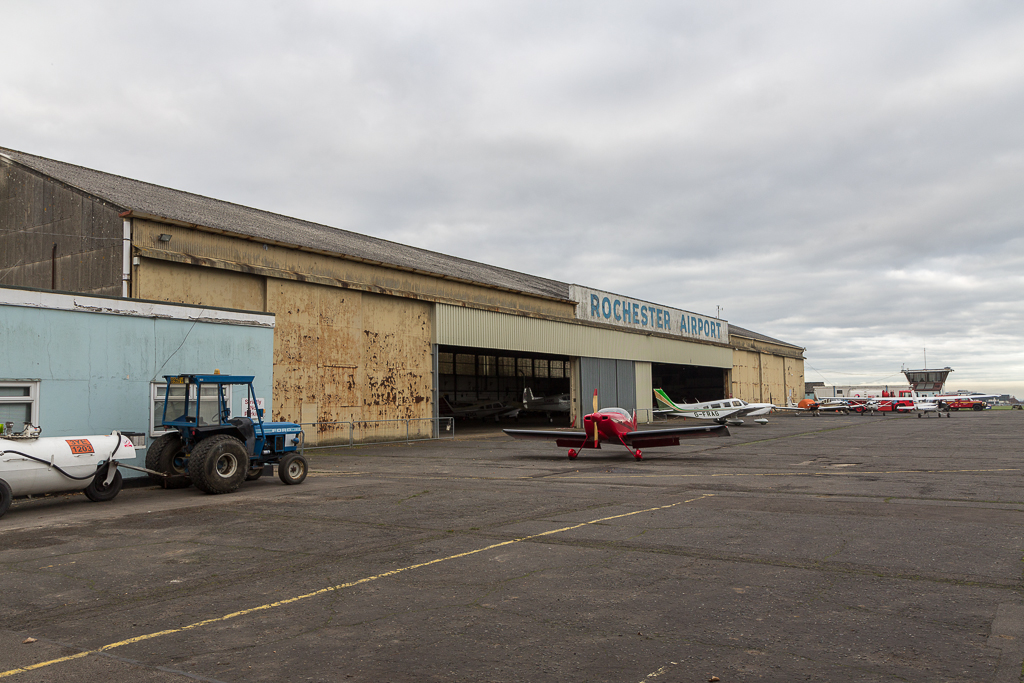
Rochester Airport hangar and control tower in 2013

In 2013 the Conservative-led Medway Council announced their wish for some of the airport land to be separated off and developed for industrial use. This proposal would close one of the runways but allow some of the money raised by development to pay for improvements to the runway that would remain. An invitation to tender was issued and the existing operator became the preferred bidder after the closing date of 12 March 2013. Precise details of how the council proposesd to finance the scheme prior to the development plans being implemented was unclear. Local ward councillors were very enthusiastic about the proposals and once they are implemented should see the Airport being available for use for a greater part of the year due to an all-weather surface being planned for the 02/20 runway. It is hoped this will make the airport operation more sustainable and help finance some of the proposed initiatives.

February 2015: Although a Planning application to make improvements to the Airport were approved by Medway Council, a vociferous local objector went to the high court asking for a judicial review of the planning approval. The council lost and the aerodrome operator had to make a new application which again incurred significant expense in order to satisfy the judge's ruling that an Environmental Impact Study should made. This further delay caused the operation company (Rochester Airport Ltd) to split the application into two parts, one application for the runway and one application for the refurbishment of the 1930s-built hangar and the building of a tower and replacement hangar and workshops for the Medway Aircraft Preservation Society (MAPS). The refurbishment of the original 1930s hangar, a new tower and hub building providing improved facilities for the Pilots And Friends of Rochester Airport (PAFRA) and for local business, recreational and business flyers.

In 2019 works to update the airfield began. As part of these, runway 16/34 was decommissioned. It is expected that the first stage of these works will see the setting up of a light industrial area in the northern part of the airfield. Later on, airfield management hope to rebuild the hangars and construct a new terminal building. The long-term plan includes the upgrade of the existing grass runway 02/20, which will see grass replaced with a hard surface.

== Head-up display manufacture ==
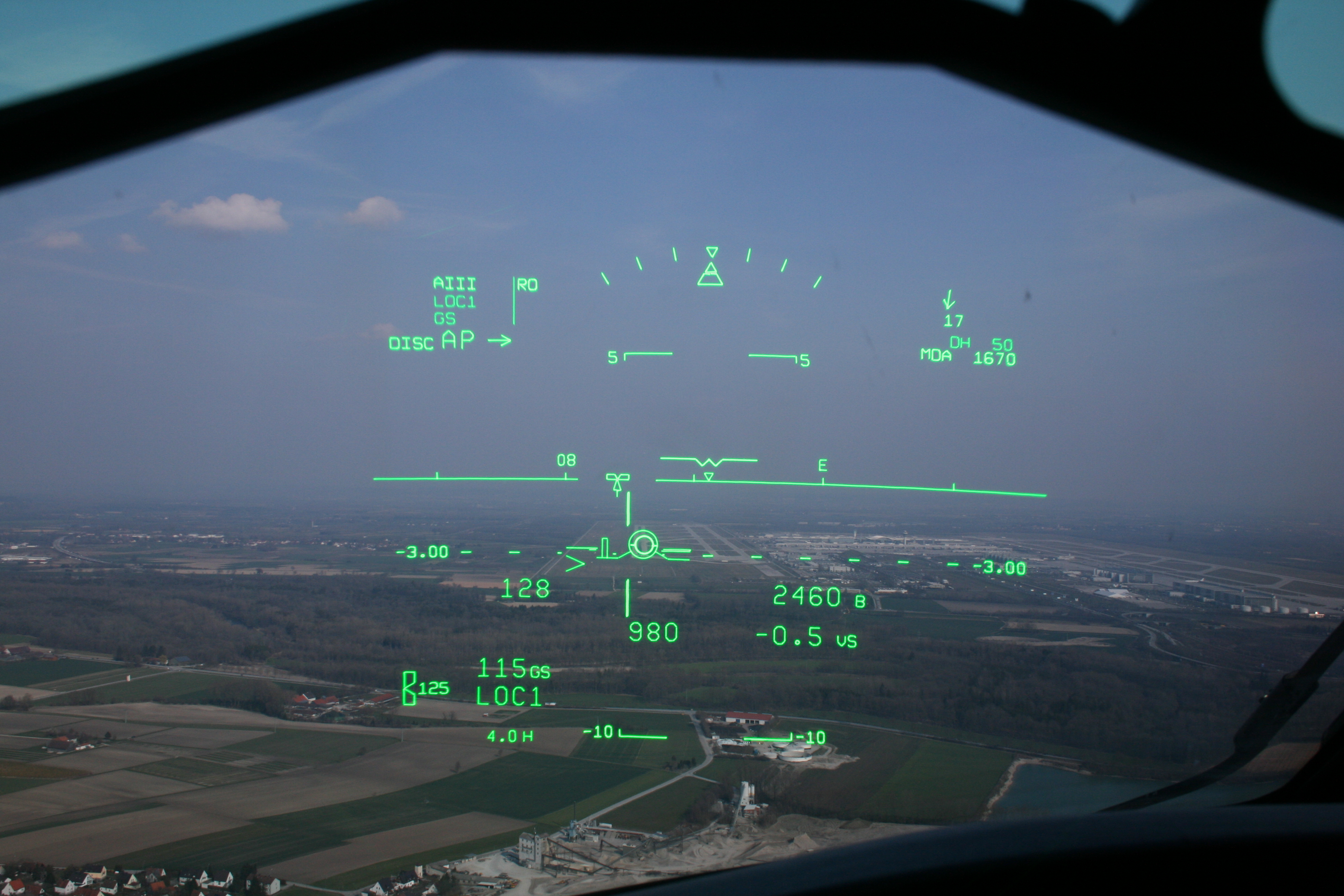
Head-up display

The first contract for head-up displays was for 800 Saab Viggen aircraft in 1965, when at Sydenham. Few companies made head-up displays in 1965, and Britain was more advanced than the US in this field of manufacture, and it had been invented in the UK by Frank Clarke, who sold it to Smiths. Peter Hearne led the GEC development.

The first main contract for the United States was for the LTV A-7 Corsair II for the US Navy, and part of the ILAAS digital navigation system, would be for 1,500 Corsairs from 1968.

It made the head-up displays for the SEPECAT Jaguar. The head-up display for General Dynamics F-16 Fighting Falcon was made by GEC (and also most of RAF aircraft). There was a $57m contract for 650 USAF F-16s, and 348 F-16s for Belgium, Denmark, Norway and the Netherlands. In total there would be about 2,000 F-16 head-up displays manufactured, from 1978.

There was a Boeing C-17 Globemaster III contract in 1989, and for 75 American Airlines Boeing 737 aircraft in 1998. Its competitor was Flight Dynamics.

Smiths Industries, of Gloucestershire, built the Panavia Tornado head-up display, and possibly for the Hawk. 1,100 McDonnell Douglas F-15 Eagles were fitted with Smiths head-up displays in the early 1990s, and the Eurofighter had Smiths head-up displays.

== See also ==
- Airports of London - Wikipedia
