= Liberia in World War II =

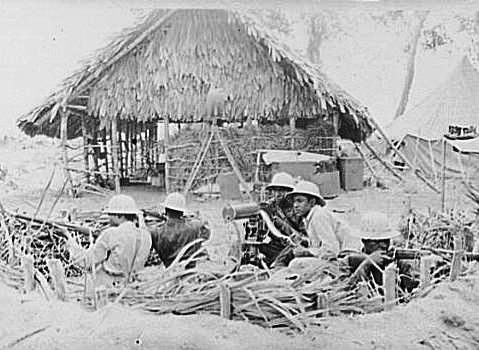
American troops in Liberia during World War II

Liberia became militarily involved in World War II in January 1944, with the election of William Tubman, at which time it declared war on Germany and Japan. Before this, Liberia participated in the war for two years under the terms of a defense agreement with the United States. Apart from Ceylon (present day Sri Lanka) and the Belgian Congo, Liberia possessed one of the few remaining sources of rubber for the Allies. To guarantee a steady supply of rubber from the world's largest rubber plantation, operated at Harbel by the Firestone Company since 1926, the US government built roads throughout the country, created an international airport (known as Robertsfield Airport), and transformed the capital, Monrovia, by building a deep water port (the Freeport of Monrovia).

== History ==
In early 1942 the Liberian government granted the U.S. the right to "construct, control, operate, and defend such commercial and military airfields as might be deemed necessary by mutual agreement". Therefore an advance U.S. Army construction force arrived in June 1942. It was tasked to prepare installations and defend them pending the arrival of the full force. The advance force was made up of the 41st Engineer General Service Regiment (less the 2d Battalion), Company A, 812th Engineer Aviation Battalion (later redesignated the 899th Engineer Aviation Company), the 802d Coast Artillery Battery, and an advance detachment of the 25th Station Hospital. The eventual full deployment of the 25th Station Hospital Unit represented the first African American medical unit to be sent overseas. A detachment was dispatched to Monrovia to train the Liberian Frontier Force. The 1st Battalion, 367th Infantry Regiment was also earmarked for Liberia. After being on and off alerts since April 1942, the unit, now reorganised as a separate battalion, arrived in the country on 10 March 1943. It principally guarded supplied and Robertsfield. But after 10 months in Liberia the battalion was sent to Oran in French North Africa to guard airbases. The 99th Pursuit Squadron was also earmarked for Liberia but its deployment there was cancelled when after January 1943 the need for air defence there had dissipated with the threat from Vichy and the Axis removed. (Employment of Negro Troops, 452)

Eventually the 802nd Coastal Artillery Battery was disbanded in Liberia; instructors for the Liberia Guard Force and hospital and service troops remained, as Robertsfield remained useful to the Air Transport Command until the end of the war. (Employment of Negro Troops, 622).

U.S. Army Forces in Liberia came under the command of Brigadier General Percy L. Sadler; there were some instances of conflict between the U.S. troops, almost entirely Black, and the Liberian population.

In 1944, with its entry into the war, Liberia adopted the United States dollar and became one of only four countries in Africa to join the newly formed United Nations.

The Africa-Middle East Theater of Operations was "established on March 1, 1945, was mainly concerned with the liquidation of the Army's property holdings and other interests in Africa, Palestine, and the Persian Gulf area. The North African installations of the Mediterranean Theater and its base commands at Casablanca were transferred to the new Theater in March 1945; the United States Army Forces in Liberia were transferred to it in April 1945." "The United States Army Forces in Liberia were subsequently under the North African Service Command, which was the former Mediterranean Base Section, at Casablanca. By 1946 all [the Town Commands] except the agency at Casablanca were discontinued." U.S. Army Forces in Liberia was inactivated on 28 February 1946.

== See also ==
- Liberia in World War I
