= No. 668 Squadron AAC =

No. 668 (Training) Squadron AAC No. 668 Squadron RAF
- Active: 16 November 1944 – 10 November 1945 (RAF); 1969 - 1971; June 1990 - present
- Country: United Kingdom
- Branch: Army Air Corps
- Part of: 2 (Training) Regiment Army Air Corps
- Garrison/HQ: Middle Wallop Flying Station

No. 668 Squadron AAC is squadron of the British Army's Army Air Corps. It was previously a glider squadron of the Royal Air Force active during the Second World War as part of No. 229 Group RAF, South East Asia Command.

== History ==
No. 668 Squadron RAF was formed on 16 November 1944 at Calcutta, (then) British India as a glider squadron, with the intention of being used for airborne operations by South East Asia Command. It continued to train, as part of No. 343 Wing RAF, until the surrender of Japan, when it became surplus to requirements. The squadron was disbanded on 10 November 1945 at Fateh Jang.

== Today ==
No. 668 Squadron AAC was formed as 668 Aviation Squadron operating Bell Sioux AH.1s and de Havilland Canada Beaver AL.1 before being disbanded during 1971. It was reformed during June 1990 at Middle Wallop as part of the School of Army Aviation, the squadron joined 2 Regiment when it was formed on 1 September 1994.

The squadron is responsible for the groundcrew training that includes re-arming, refueling and ground maneuvers of the Boeing AH-64E Apache.

== Aircraft operated ==
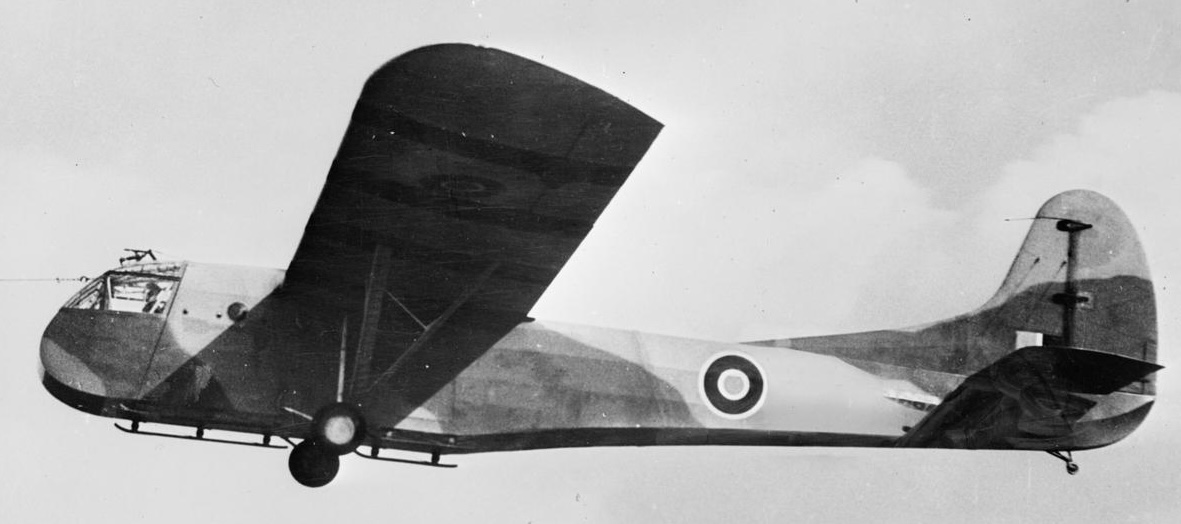
A Waco CG-4 (Hadrian) in British service.

Aircraft operated by no. 668 Squadron RAF, data from
From	To	Aircraft	Version
February 1945	April 1945	Waco Hadrian	
August 1945	November 1945	de Havilland Tiger Moth	Mk.II

== Squadron bases ==
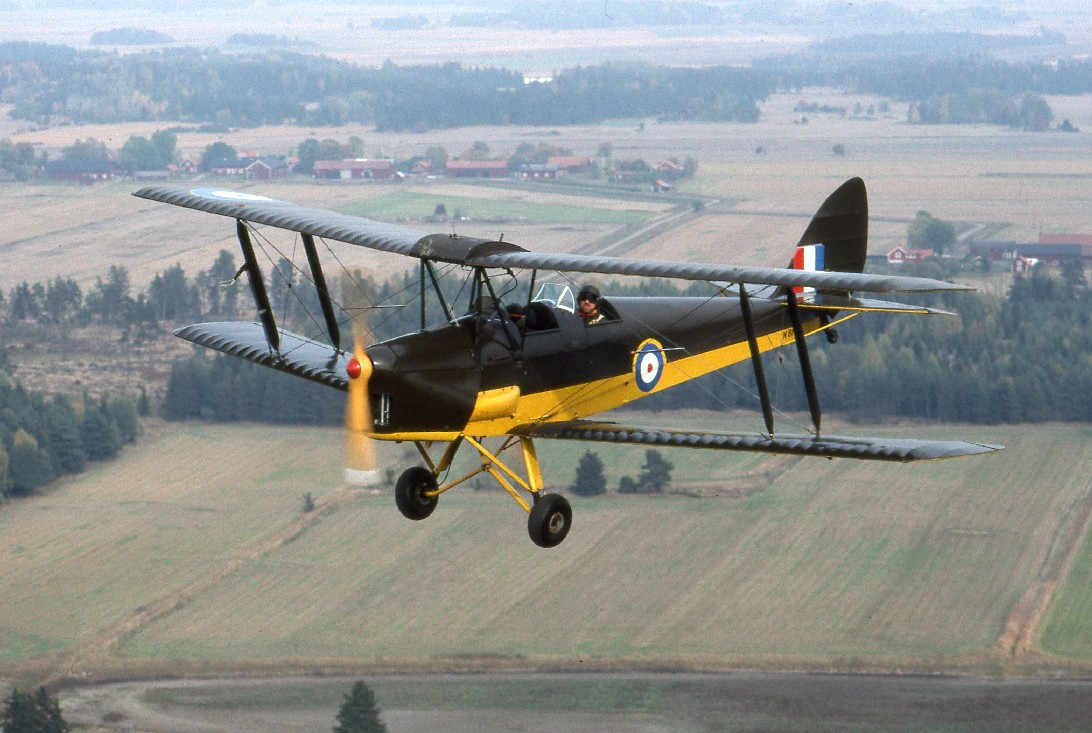
A de Havilland Tiger Moth restored in wartime colours.

Bases and airfields used by no. 669 Squadron RAF, data from
From	To	Base
16 November 1944	4 February 1945	Calcutta, Bengal, British India
4 February 1945	30 April 1945	Lalaghat/Rajyeswarpur, Bengal, British India
30 April 1945	28 June 1945	Belgaum, Karnataka, British India
28 June 1945	5 July 1945	Fatehjang, Punjab, British India
5 July 1945	21 August 1945	Upper Topa Camp, Punjab, British India
21 August 1945	10 November 1945	Fatehjang, Punjab, British India
