= Saro A.33 =

A.33

General information
- Type: Flying boat
- National origin: United Kingdom
- Manufacturer: Saunders-Roe Limited
- Status: Prototype
- Number built: 1

History
- First flight: 14 October 1938

The Saro A.33 was a British prototype flying boat built by Saunders-Roe Limited in response to a British Air Ministry Specification R.2/33 and in competition with the Short Sunderland.

== Design and development ==
The A.33 was a four-engined flying-boat with a parasol monospar wing, the wing was supported by two angled N-struts which connected the wing to hull-mounted sponsons. Hull-mounted sponsons were used rather than wingtip floats and were also used as fuel tanks. A Saro Cloud was modified with a monospar wing and sponsons to test the design concepts. The prototype A.33 serial number K4773 first flew on 14 October 1938. However, it was written off after structural failure sustained during high-speed taxi trials on 25 October 1938 and development was abandoned. A production contract for eleven aircraft was cancelled.

== Specifications ==
Data from British Flying Boats

General characteristics

- Length: 75 ft 0 in (22.86 m)
- Wingspan: 95 ft 0 in (28.96 m)
- Height: 22 ft 8 1/2 in (6.922 m)
- Wing area: 1,194 sq ft (110.9 m^{2})
- Empty weight: 31,500 lb (14,288 kg)
- Gross weight: 41,500 lb (18,824 kg)
- Powerplant: 4 × Bristol Perseus XII 9-cylinder air-cooled radial engines, 830 hp (620 kW) each
- Propellers: 3-bladed variable-pitch propellers

Performance

- Maximum speed: 200 mph (320 km/h, 170 kn)
- Cruise speed: 174 mph (280 km/h, 151 kn)
- Endurance: 12 hours
- Service ceiling: 14,280 ft (4,350 m)
- Wing loading: 34.8 lb/sq ft (170 kg/m^{2})

Armament

- Guns: Machine guns in bow turret, tail turret and two beam positions
- Bombs: 2,000 lb (907 kg) bombs

== See also ==
- Short Sunderland

Aircraft of comparable role, configuration, and era

- Blackburn Sydney
- Consolidated P2Y
- Consolidated PBY Catalina
- Dornier Do 24
- Kawanishi H6K
- Latécoère 300
- Lioré et Olivier LeO H-47
- Potez-CAMS 141

Related lists

- List of flying boats and floatplanes
