= Short Sunderland =

WWII era flying boat patrol bomber

Sunderland
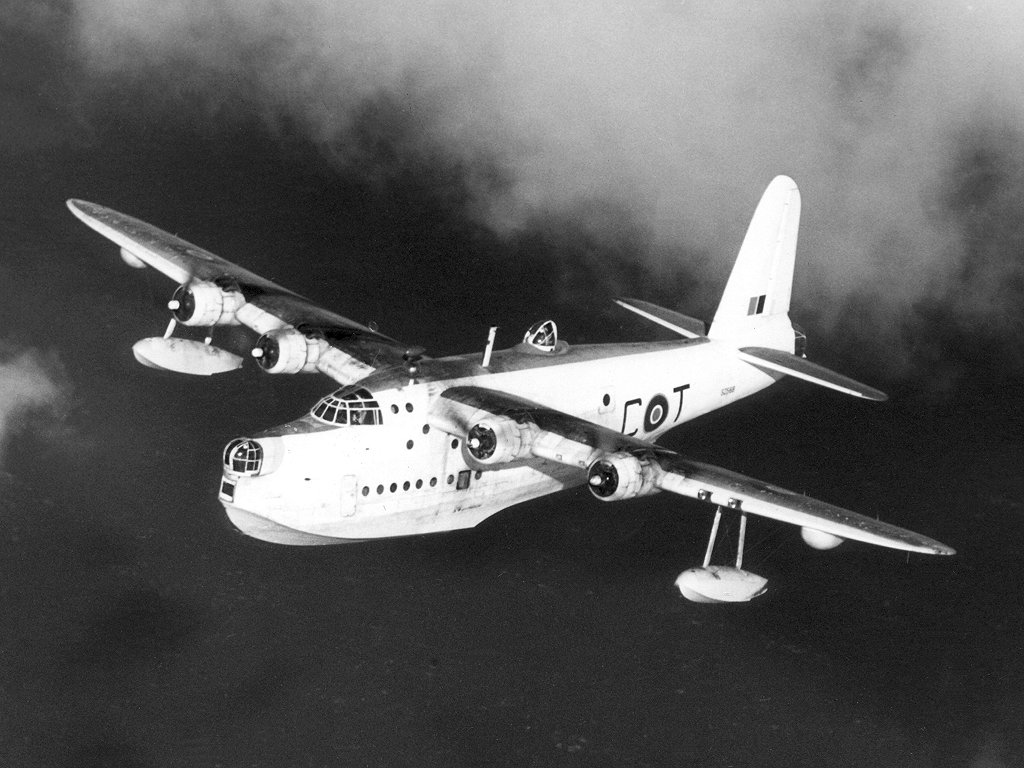
- Short Sunderland Mk V in flight

General information
- Type: Military flying boat bomber
- Manufacturer: Short Brothers
- Designer: Arthur Gouge
- Status: Retired
- Primary users: Royal Air Force Royal Canadian Air Force; French Navy; Royal Australian Air Force; South African Air Force; Royal New Zealand Air Force
- Number built: 749

History
- Manufactured: 1938–1946
- Introduction date: 1938
- First flight: 16 October 1937
- Retired: RAF: 1959; RNZAF: 1967
- Variants: Short Sandringham; Short Seaford

The Short S.25 Sunderland is a British flying boat patrol bomber, developed and constructed by Short Brothers for the Royal Air Force (RAF). The aircraft took its service name from the town (latterly, city) and port of Sunderland in North East England.

Developed in parallel with the civilian S.23 Empire flying boat, the flagship of Imperial Airways, the Sunderland was developed specifically to conform to the requirements of British Air Ministry Specification R.2/33 for a long-range patrol/reconnaissance flying boat to serve with the Royal Air Force. Sharing several similarities with the S.23, it had a more advanced aerodynamic hull and was fitted with various offensive and defensive armaments, including machine gun turrets, bombs, aerial mines, and depth charges. The Sunderland was powered by four Bristol Pegasus XVIII radial engines and was fitted with various detection equipment to aid combat operations, including the Leigh searchlight, the ASV Mark II and ASV Mark III radar units, and an astrodome.

The Sunderland was one of the most powerful and widely used flying boats throughout the Second World War. In addition to the RAF, the type was operated by other Allied military air wings, including the Royal Australian Air Force (RAAF), Royal Canadian Air Force (RCAF), South African Air Force (SAAF), Royal New Zealand Air Force (RNZAF), French Navy, Norwegian Air Force, and the Portuguese Navy. During the conflict, the type was heavily involved in Allied efforts to counter the threat posed by German U-boats in the Battle of the Atlantic. On 17 July 1940, an RAAF Sunderland (of No. 10 Squadron) performed the type's first unassisted U-boat kill. Sunderlands also played a major role in the Mediterranean theatre, performing maritime reconnaissance flights and logistical support missions. During the evacuation of Crete, shortly after the German invasion of the island, several aircraft were used to transport troops. Numerous unarmed Sunderlands were also flown by civil operator British Overseas Airways Corporation (BOAC), traversing routes as far afield as the Pacific Ocean.

During the post-war era, use of the Sunderland throughout Europe rapidly declined, while greater numbers remained in service in the Far East, where large developed runways were less prevalent. Between mid-1950 and September 1954, several squadrons of RAF Sunderlands saw combat action during the Korean War. Around a dozen aircraft also participated in the Berlin airlift, delivering supplies to the blockaded German city. The RAF continued to use the Sunderland in a military capacity up to 1959. In December 1960, the French Navy retired its aircraft, which were the last remaining examples in military use in the Northern Hemisphere. The type also remained in service with the RNZAF up to 1967, when they were replaced by the land-based Lockheed P-3 Orion. A number of Sunderlands were converted for use within the civil sector, where they were known as the Hythe and the Sandringham; in this configuration, the type continued in airline operation until 1974 – despite being originally made for military use, the Sunderland had a far longer commercial lifespan than its civilian Empire sibling and was one of the last large WWII-era flying boats in airline service. Several examples have been preserved, including a single airworthy Sunderland which has been placed on display in Florida at Fantasy of Flight.

== Development ==
=== Origins ===
During the early 1930s there was intense international competition to develop suitable aircraft to operate new long-range intercontinental passenger service between the United Kingdom, the United States, France and Germany. It was recognised that the United Kingdom had no existing equivalent to the new American Sikorsky S-42 flying boats or the German Dornier Do X. Accordingly, in 1934, the British Postmaster General declared that all first-class Royal Mail sent overseas was to travel by air, establishing a subsidy for the development of intercontinental air transport in a fashion similar to the U.S. domestic programme a decade earlier. In response, Imperial Airways announced a competition to design and manufacture a fleet of 28 large flying boats, each weighing 18 long tons (18 tonnes) and having a range of 700 mi (1,100 km) with a capacity for 24 passengers. A corresponding contract was issued to Short Brothers of Rochester for their design, which became the S.23 Empire.

While the Empire flying boat has often been credited as a predecessor of the Sunderland this impression is not strictly true. During November 1933 the British Air Ministry released Specification R.2/33, which called for the development of a next-generation long-range general purpose flying boat, intended to perform ocean reconnaissance missions. The specification called for an aircraft, either a monoplane or biplane, which would have a performance equal to the recently constructed Short Sarafand flying boat, but powered by a maximum of four engines and much more compact than the Sarafand. Specification R.2/33 was released before the publication of the commercial Imperial Airways requirement; by the time that Short received Imperial Airways' request the company had already started planning the design of the prospective military flying boat. After reviewing both sets of requirements, Short decided to prioritise the development of the civil S.23 design but also to work on a response to specification R.2/33.

Chief designer Arthur Gouge had originally intended for a COW 37 mm gun to be mounted in the bow of the craft to accompany the single Lewis gun installed in its tail. As with the S.23, he aimed to produce a fuselage which generated the lowest amount of drag possible, while a much longer nose than had been used for the S.23 was ultimately adopted.

=== Selection ===
During October 1934, Shorts settled upon the general configuration and geometry of the design, opting for a four-engine shoulder-wing monoplane configuration, similar to the Short Empire which had been ordered at the same time. The military flying boat design received the internal designation of S.25. While the S.25 design bore a strong resemblance to the civil S.23, it had an improved aerodynamic form, and sheet metal with curvature in more than one direction. This compound curve was more complex to manufacture but gave a superior shape.

During late 1934 the S.25 proposal was submitted to the Air Ministry. Rival firm Saunders-Roe had also designed and submitted its own proposal, the Saro A.33, in response to Specification R.2/33. Following evaluation of the submissions, the Ministry decided to place orders for the production of prototypes of both the S.25 and A.33.

During April 1936 the Air Ministry was sufficiently confident in Shorts' submission to place a contract for an initial batch of 11 further aircraft. On 4 July 1936, the first of the Empire flying boats to be built, G-ADHL, named Canopus, made its first flight which confirmed the basic principles of the S.25's design. while the crucial final design conference was held around the same time as the flight. The sole A.33 was damaged beyond repair due to a structural failure, resulting in the S.25 being the only candidate.

As construction of the prototype S.25 proceeded, several design changes were made. In response to feedback from Air Ministry and the Royal Air Force, it was decided to change its defensive armament to a single 0.303 Vickers K machine gun in the nose turret and four 0.303 Browning machine guns in the tail turret. The tail turret was also changed to a powered version; Gouge therefore had to devise a solution to account for the resulting movement aft of the aircraft's centre of gravity, which was initially achieved via the presence of ballast positioned in the forward area. By the end of September 1937, the prototype had been completed.

=== Flight testing ===
On 16 October 1937, the prototype (K4774) made its maiden flight, fitted with Bristol Pegasus X radial engines each capable of producing 950 hp (710 kW) of power. The more powerful Pegasus XXII was unavailable at the time. Flown by Shorts' chief test pilot John Lankester Parker and Harold Piper, the initial flight lasted for around 45 minutes; later that day, a second flight of a similar duration was made. Parker later declared his satisfaction with the basic design. Prior to the first flight, the type had received the name Sunderland.

Following early flight trials the aircraft was returned to the workshop where it underwent further modifications; the adoption of a wing sweepback of 4° 15' was achieved by the addition of a spacer into the front spar attachments. This was a response to the changes in defensive armament, and moved the centre of lift enough to compensate for the altered centre of gravity; further alterations were necessary to maintain the hydrodynamics properties. On 7 March 1938, K4774 made its first post-modification flight, having been fitted with the intended Bristol Pegasus XXII radial engines, each one capable of producing 1,010 hp (750 kW).

On 21 April 1938, the first aircraft of the development batch made its first flight. By this point, manufacturer testing of the prototype had already been completed and the prototype had been transferred to the Seaplane Experimental Station at Felixstowe, Suffolk for evaluation by the Marine Aircraft Experimental Establishment (MAEE); on 8 March 1938, it was joined by the second production aircraft. On 28 May 1938, this second aircraft, which had been cleared for operations under tropical conditions, flew a record-breaking flight to Seletar, Singapore, stopping off at Gibraltar, Malta, Alexandria, Habbaniyah, Bahrain, Karachi, Gwalior, Calcutta, Rangoon, and Mergui.

Testing showed that the aircraft could be fully refuelled in 20 minutes, and that its most economical cruising speed was about 130 kn (150 mph; 240 km/h) at 2,000 ft (600 m). At this speed and altitude, a consumption rate of 110 imperial gallons per hour (500 L/h) gave the aircraft an endurance of 18 hours, during which it could cover 2,750 statute miles (4,430 km). (Note: The distance from Bristol to St. John's, Newfoundland, is just over 2,200 statute miles (3,500 km), allowing the Sunderland to cross the Atlantic with ample reserves.) The take-off distance was found to be 680 yd (620 m).

== Design ==
=== Overview ===
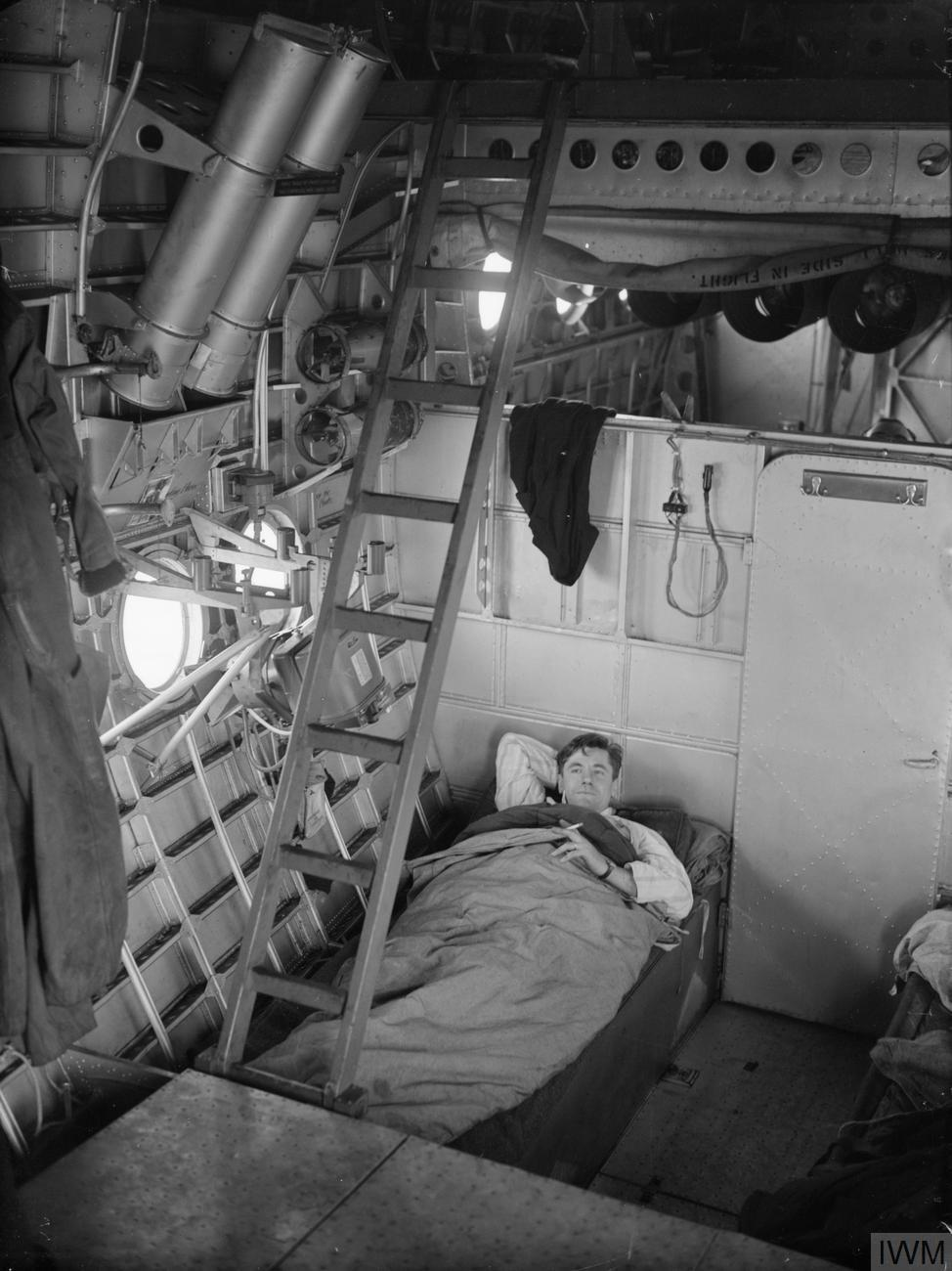
Bunk area

The Short S.25 Sunderland was a large four-engined flying boat developed for military use. The design of the S.25 shared much in common with the civil-orientated S.23, principally differing in its use of a deeper hull profile. As with the S.23, the interior of the Sunderland's fuselage contained two individual decks; the lower deck contained a total of six bunks, along with a galley outfitted with a twin kerosene pressure stove, a yacht-style porcelain flush toilet, an anchoring winch, and a small machine shop for performing inflight repairs. The crew was originally intended to total seven members; this was subsequently increased for later versions of the Sunderland to around 11 crew members and sometimes more, dependent upon the specific mission being undertaken.

The Sunderland featured all-metal, mainly flush-riveted construction, except for the flight control surfaces, which used a fabric-covered metal frame construction. Of these, the flaps employed unusual Gouge-patented devices that slid backwards along curved tracks, moving rearwards and downwards to increase the wing area and generating 30% greater lift for landing. The thick wings, upon which the aircraft's four nacelle-mounted Bristol Pegasus XXII radial engines were carried, also accommodated a total of six drum-style fuel tanks, which had a total capacity of 9,200 litres (2,025 Imperial gallons, 2,430 U.S. gallons). In addition to the main fuel tanks, an arrangement of four smaller fuel tanks was installed behind the rear wing spar later on; with the extra tanks fitted, the Sunderland had a combined total fuel capacity of 11,602 litres (2,550 Imperial gallons, 3,037 U.S. gallons), which was enough to enable the type to conduct eight- to 14-hour patrols.

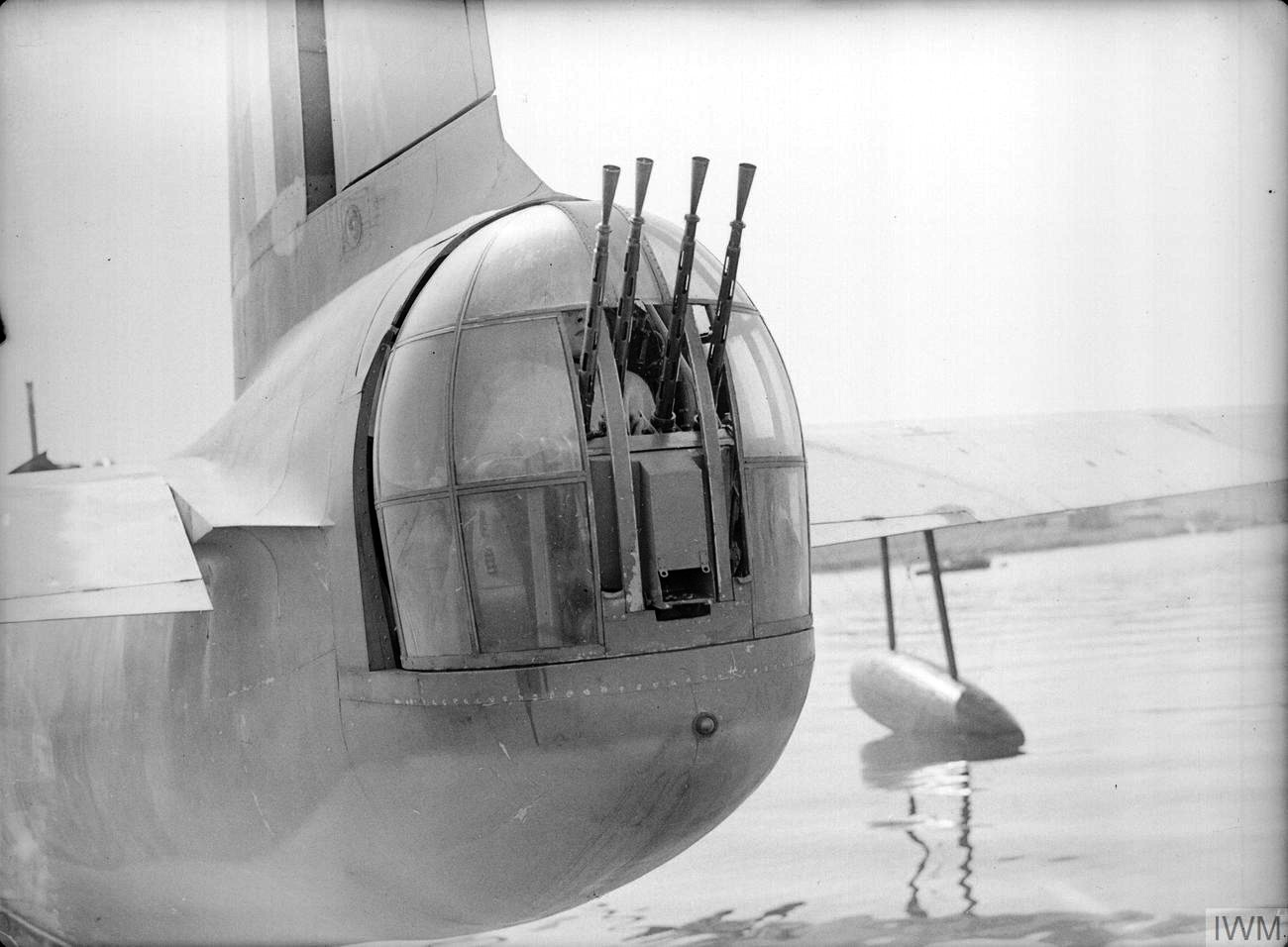
The FN13 rear turret of a Sunderland of No 210 Squadron at Oban, August 1940. The Sunderland was the first RAF flying boat to be fitted with power-operated gun turrets.

The specification to which the Sunderland was developed to conform with had called for an offensive armament of a 37 mm gun and up to 2,000 lb (910 kg) of bombs, mines or (eventually) depth charges. The ordnance was stored inside the fuselage in a purpose-built bomb room and was winched up to racks, under the wing centre section, that could be traversed out through doors on each side of the fuselage above the waterline to the release position. Defensive armament included a Nash & Thompson FN-13 powered turret with four .303 British Browning machine guns in the extreme tail and a pair of manually operated .303 set on either side of the fuselage, firing from ports just below and behind the wings. These machine guns were later upgraded to 0.5-inch calibre Brownings. There were two different nose turret weapons, the most common, later, being two Browning machine guns. The nose weapons were later augmented by four fixed guns, two each side, in the forward fuselage that were fired by the pilot. Much later, a twin-gun turret was to be dorsal-mounted on the upper fuselage, about level with the wing trailing edge, bringing the total defensive armament up to 16 machine guns.

=== Equipment and on-water management ===
As with all water-based aircraft, there was a need to be able to navigate on water and to control the craft up to and at a mooring. In addition to the standard navigation lights, there was also a demountable mooring mast that was positioned on the upper fuselage just aft of the astrodome hatch with a 360-degree white light to show that the aircraft was moored. The crewmembers were trained in common marine signals for watercraft to ensure safety in busy waters. The craft could be moored to a buoy by a pendant that attached to the keel under the forward fuselage. When the craft was off the buoy, the forward end of the pendant was attached to the front of the hull just below the bomb aimer's window. For anchoring, there was a demountable bollard that fixed to the forward fuselage from where the front turret was retracted to allow an airman to man the position and pick up the buoy cage or to toss out the anchor.

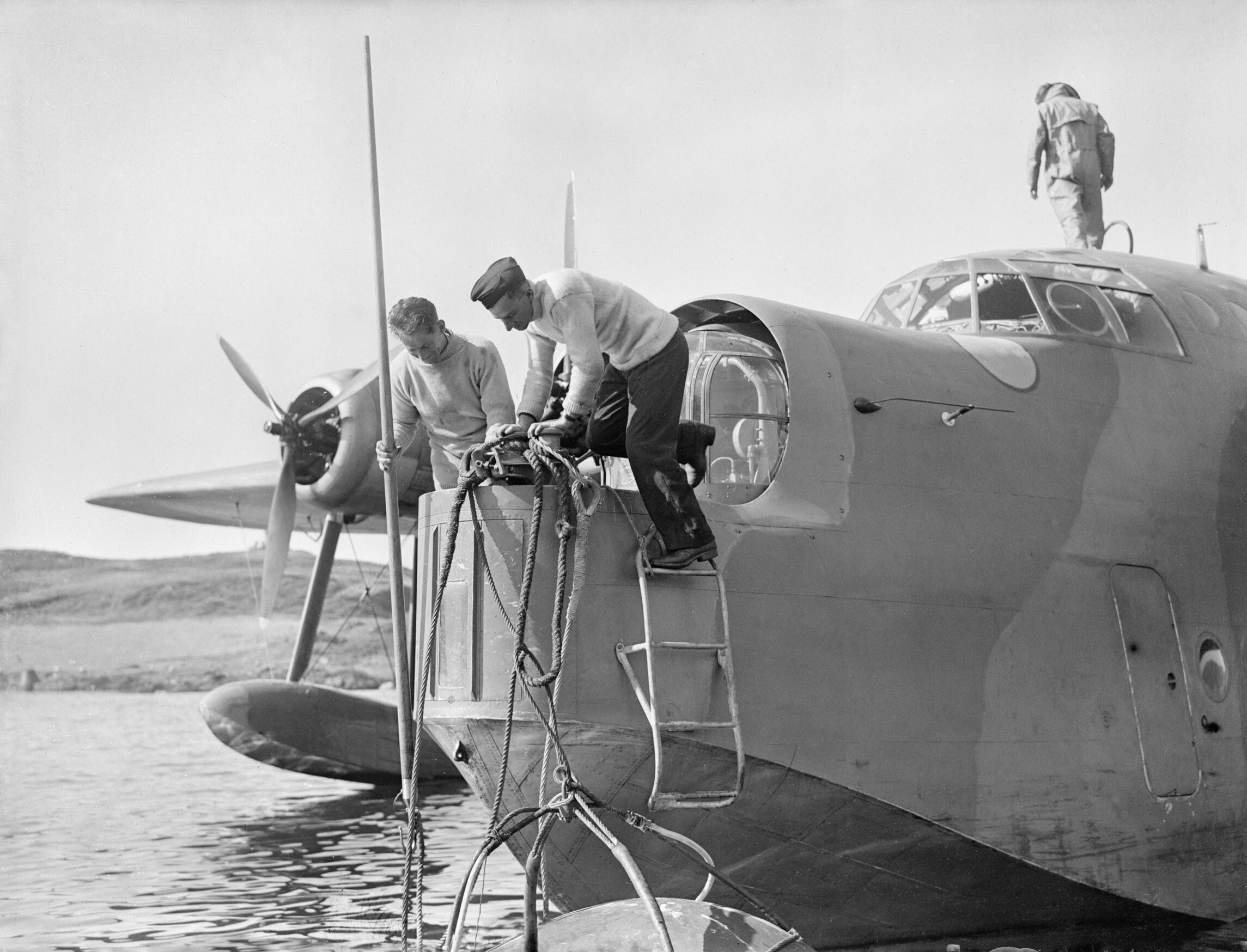
A mooring compartment was situated in the nose of the Sunderland, containing anchor, winch, boat-hook and ladder. The front turret was designed to slide back, enabling the crew to secure the aircraft to a buoy, as demonstrated here.

For taxiing after landing, the galley hatches were used to extend sea drogues that could be used to turn the aircraft or maintain its crosswind progress (by deploying the drogue on one side only), or to slow forward motion as much as possible (both deployed). When not in use, the drogues were hand hauled back inboard, folded, and stowed in wall-mounted containers just below the hatches. Operation of the drogues could be a very dangerous exercise if the aircraft was travelling on the water at speed or in strong currents, because the approximately three-foot-diameter (one-metre) drogue would haul up on its five-tonne attachment cable end inside the galley very sharply and powerfully. Once deployed, it was normally impossible to recover a drogue unless the aircraft was stationary relative to the local tidal flow.

Portable beaching gear could be attached by ground crew so that the aircraft could be pulled up on land. The gear consisted of a pair of two-wheeled struts that could be attached to either side of the fuselage, below the wing, with a two- or four-wheel trolley and towbar attached under the rear of the hull. A standard stocked anchor was stowed in the forward compartment alongside the anchor winch. Depending on the operating area, a number of different kinds of anchor could be carried to cope with different anchorages. Another means of direction control on the water was by application of the rudder and aileron flight controls. The ailerons would cause asymmetric lift from the airflow and, ultimately, drop a float into the water to cause drag on that wing. The pilots could vary engine power to control the direction and speed of the aircraft on the water. In adverse combinations of tide, wind, and destination, this could be very difficult.

=== Access and servicing ===
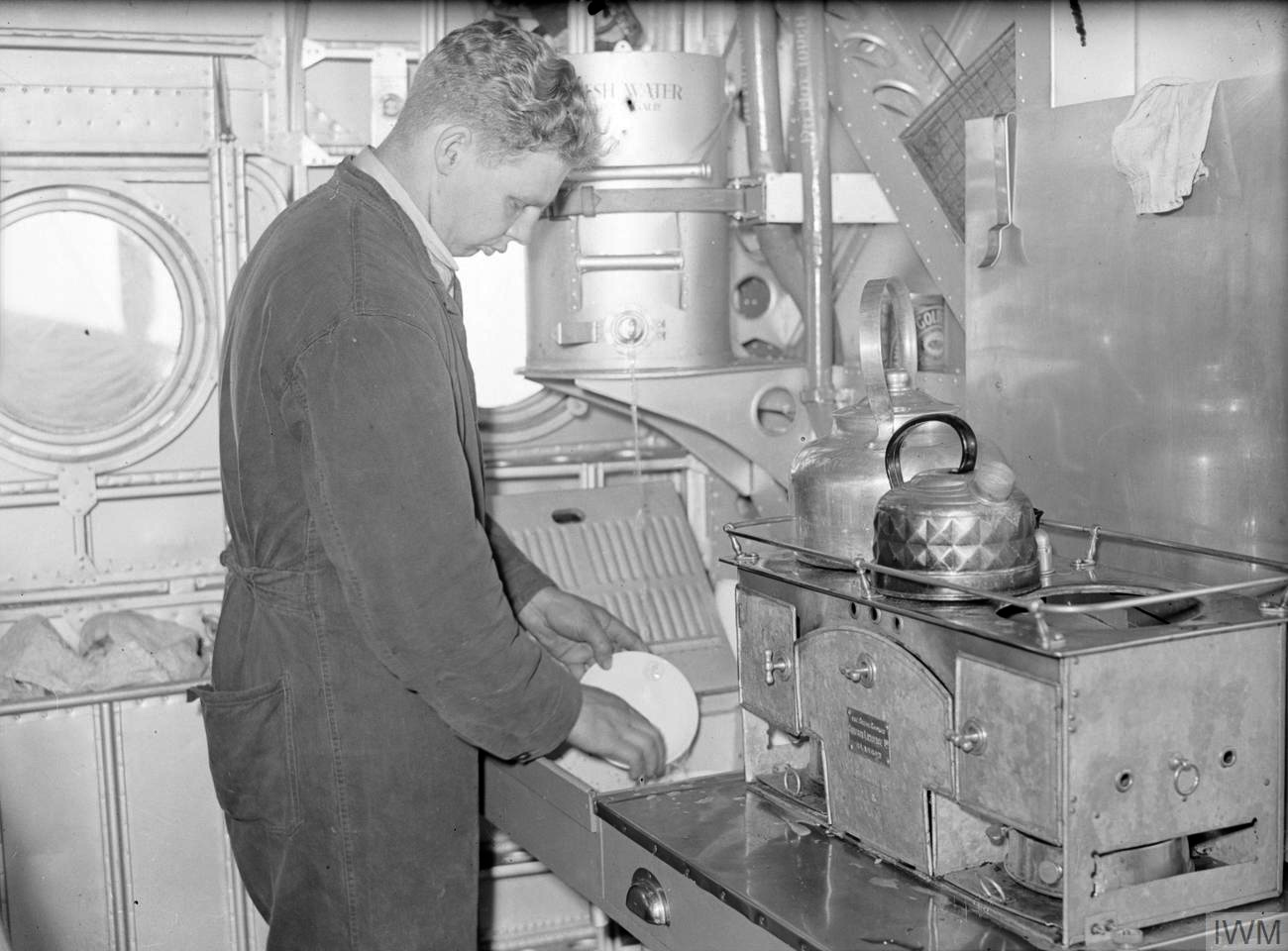
A crew member of a Short Sunderland Mark I of No. 10 Squadron RAAF, washing up in the galley during a flight

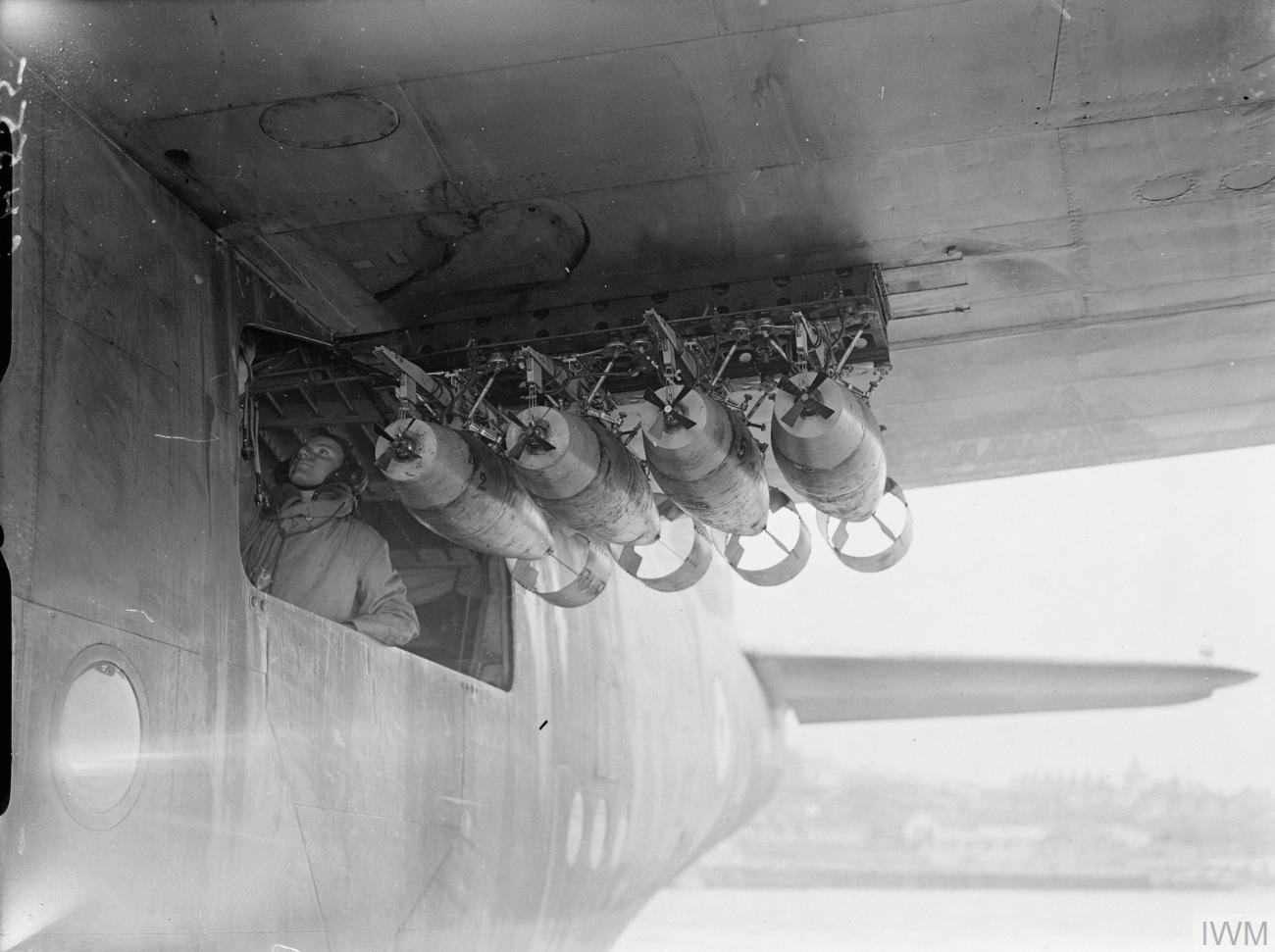
View of a deployed bomb rack

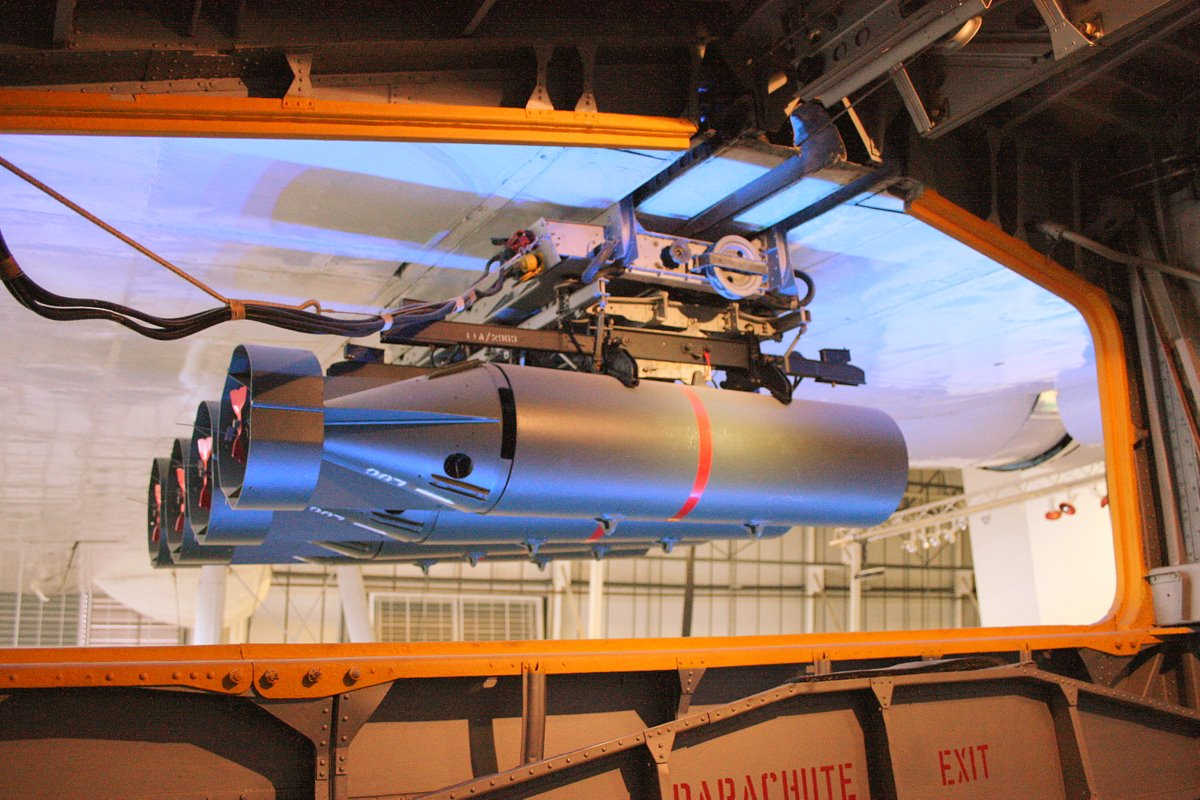
Bomb rack from inside, taken from the bomb room of a Sunderland preserved at the RAF Museum in London

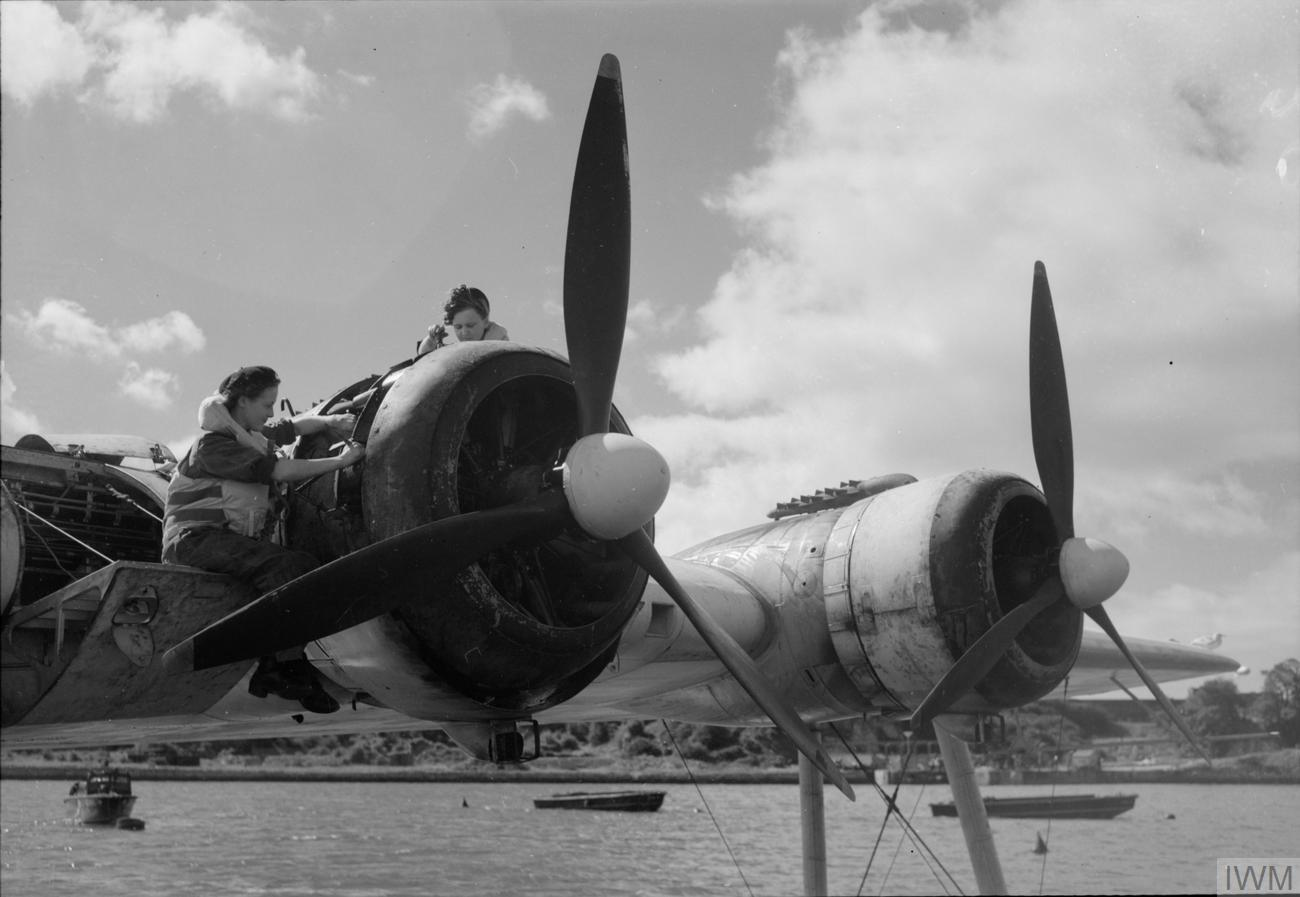
WAAF engine mechanics servicing a Bristol Pegasus engine of a Short Sunderland

The Sunderland was usually entered through the bow compartment door on the left forward side of the aircraft. The internal compartments—bow, gun room, ward room, galley, bomb room and the after compartments—were fitted with swash doors to keep them watertight to about two feet (610 mm) above normal water level; these doors were normally kept closed. There was another external door in the tail compartment on the right side. This door was intended for boarding from a U-shaped Braby pontoon that was used where there was a full passenger service mooring alongside a wharf or similar. This door could also be used to accept passengers or stretcher-bound patients when the aircraft was in the open water; this was because the engines had to be kept running to maintain the aircraft's position for the approaching vessel and the front door was too close to the left inboard propeller. Normal access to the external upper parts of the aircraft was through the astrodome hatch at the front of the front spar of the wing centre section, just at the rear of the navigator's station.

Bombs were loaded in through the "bomb doors" that formed the upper half walls of the bomb room on both sides. The bomb racks were able to run in and out from the bomb room on tracks in the underside of the wing. In order to load them, weapons were hoisted up to the extended racks that were run inboard and either lowered to stowages on the floor or prepared for use on the retracted racks above the stowed items. The doors were spring-loaded to pop inwards from their frames and would fall under gravity so that the racks could run out through the space left in the top of the compartment. The bombs could be released locally or remotely from the pilot's position during a bomb run.

Normally, the weapons were either bombs or depth charges and the racks were limited to a maximum of 1,000 lb (450 kg) each. After the first salvo was dropped, the crew had to get the next eight weapons loaded before the pilot had the aircraft positioned on the next bombing run. The fixed nose guns (introduced when in service with Australian units) were removed when the aircraft was on the water and stowed in the gun room just aft of the bow compartment. The toilet was in the right half of this same compartment and stairs from the cockpit to the bow area divided the two.

Maintenance was performed on the engines by opening panels in the leading edge of the wing either side of the powerplant. A plank could be fitted across the front of the engine on the extensions of the open panels. A small manually started auxiliary petrol engine, which was fitted into the leading edge of the right wing, powered a bilge pump for clearing water and other fluids from the fuselage bilges and a fuel pump for refuelling. Generally, the aircraft were reasonably water tight, and two people manually operating a wobble pump could transfer fuel faster than the auxiliary pump. In sheltered moorings or at sea, fuelling was accomplished by a powered or unpowered barge and with engine driven or hand powered pumps. At regular moorings, there would be specially designed refuelling barges to do the job, normally manned by trained marine crew. These vessels could refuel many aircraft during the course of the day. Handling of the fuel nozzles and opening/closing the aircraft fuel tanks would normally be an aircraftman's task.

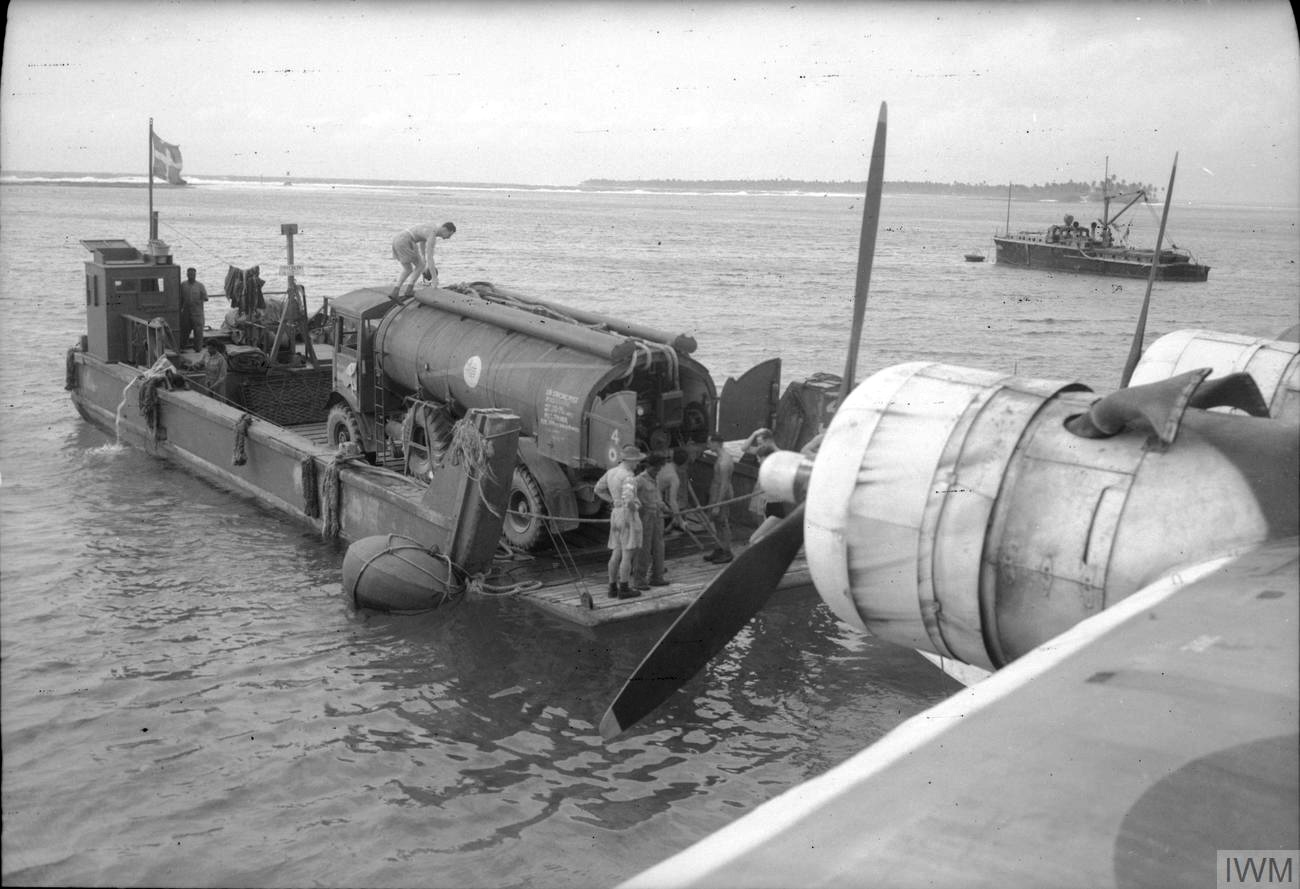
A Short Sunderland GR Mark V of No. 205 Squadron RAF Detachment, moored off Direction Island, Cocos Islands, about to be refuelled from a petrol tanker embarked on board a Tank Landing Craft

Airframe repairs were either effected from the inside or delayed until the aircraft was in a sheltered mooring or beached. One serious problem was that the heat-treated rivets in the hull plates were susceptible to corrosion after a period in salt water (depending on the quality of the heat treatment process). The heads would pop off from stress corrosion, allowing seawater to leak into the bilges. The only option was to haul the aircraft out of the water and replace them, usually at the cost of many additional heads breaking off from the vibration of the riveting.

=== Damage control ===
A large float mounted under each wing maintained stability on water. With no wind, the float on the heavier side was always in the water; with some wind, the aircraft could be held using the ailerons with both floats out of the water. In the event of a float being broken off for some reason, as the craft lost airspeed after landing crew members would go out onto the opposite wing, to keep the remaining float in the water until the aircraft could reach its mooring. Marine growths on the hull were a problem; the resulting drag could be enough to prevent a fully loaded aircraft from gaining enough speed to become airborne. The aircraft could be taken to a freshwater mooring for sufficient time to kill off the fauna and flora growing on the bottom, which would then be washed away during takeoff runs. The alternative was to scrub it off, either in the water or on land.

Aircraft with lower hull damage were patched or had the holes filled with any materials to hand before landing. The aircraft would then be immediately put onto a slipway with its wheeled beaching gear or beached on a sandy shore before it could sink. More than two fuselage compartments had to be full of water to sink the aircraft. During the Second World War, a number of severely damaged aircraft were deliberately landed on grass airfields ashore. In at least one case, an aircraft that made a grass landing was repaired to fly again. On the Sunderland Mk V, fuel could be dumped from retractable pipes that extended from the hull and were attached to the bomb room side of the galley aft bulkhead. It was expected that dumping would be done while airborne, but it could also be performed while floating on the water, albeit with care to ensure that the floating fuel went downwind away from the aircraft.

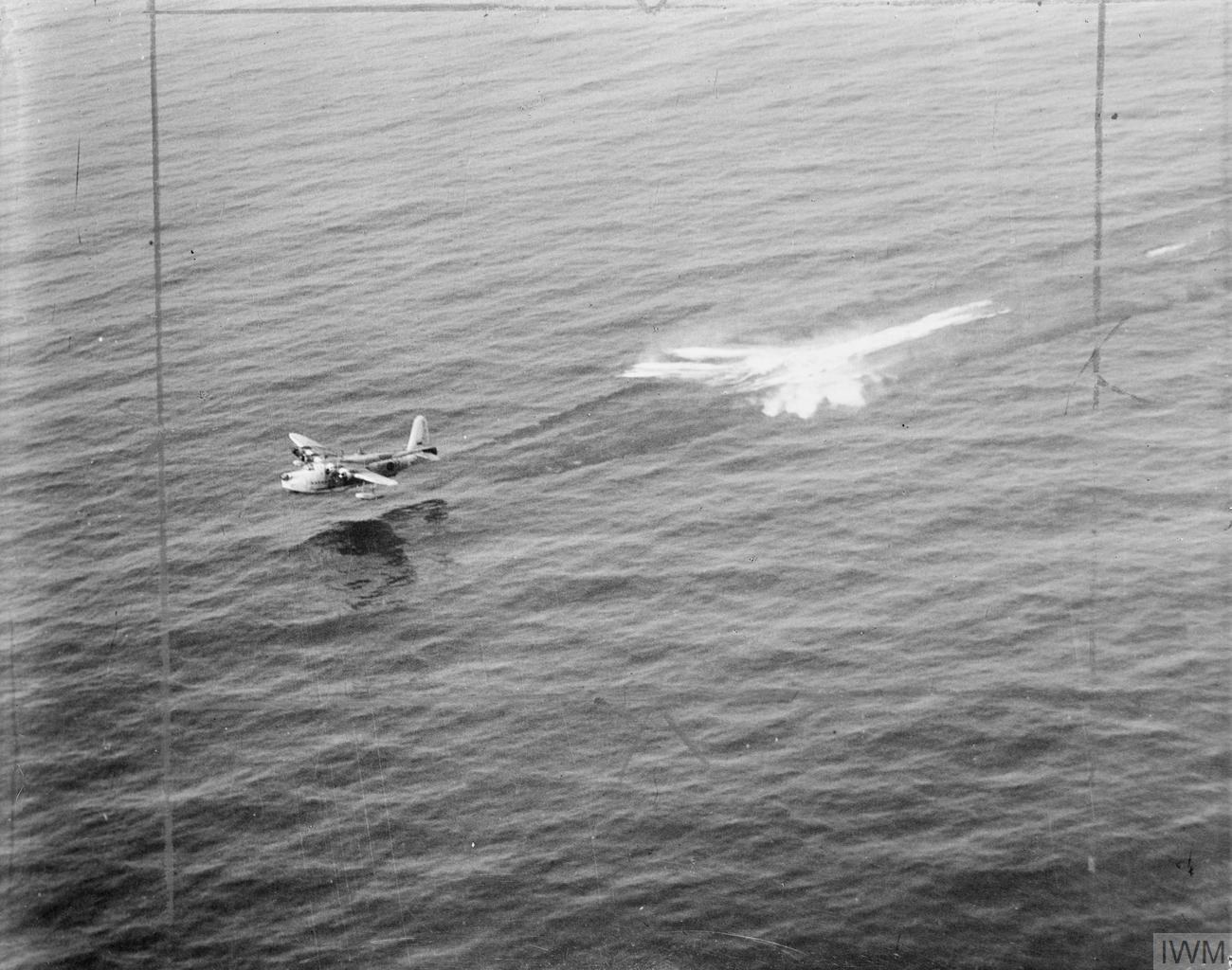
Sunderland EK573/P of No. 10 Squadron RAAF 'unsticks' after picking up three survivors from a Wellington shot down in the Bay of Biscay, 27 August 1944.

== Operational history ==
=== Second World War ===
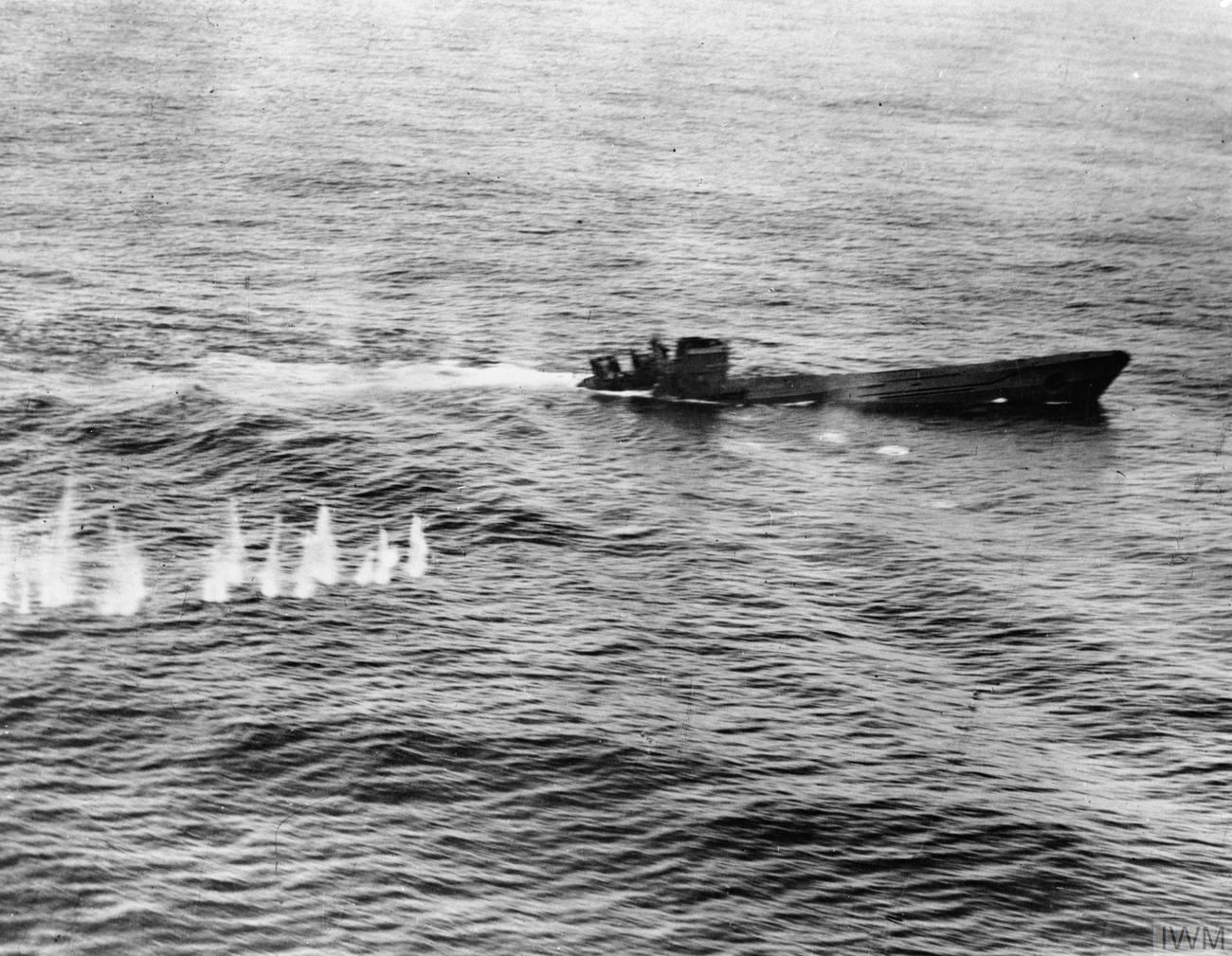
U-426, a Type VIIC submarine, down by the stern and sinking, after being attacked by a Short Sunderland flying boat

At the outbreak of the Second World War, on 3 September 1939, 39 Sunderlands were in service with the RAF. Although British anti-submarine efforts were disorganised and ineffectual at first, Sunderlands quickly proved useful in the rescue of the crews from torpedoed ships. On 21 September 1939, two Sunderlands rescued the entire 34-man crew of the torpedoed merchantman Kensington Court from the North Sea. As British anti-submarine measures improved, the Sunderland began to inflict losses as well. A Royal Australian Air Force (RAAF) Sunderland (of No. 10 Squadron) made the type's first unassisted kill of a U-boat on 17 July 1940.

During its service, the Sunderland Mark I received various improvements. The nose turret was upgraded with a second .303 (7.7 mm) gun. New propellers together with pneumatic rubber wing de-icing boots were also fitted. Although the .303 guns lacked range and hitting power, the Sunderland had a considerable number of them and it was a well-built machine that was hard to destroy. On 3 April 1940, a Sunderland operating off Norway was attacked by six German Junkers Ju 88C fighters; during the engagement, it shot one down, damaged another enough to cause it to retreat and later perform a forced landing and drove off the rest. The Germans are reputed to have nicknamed the Sunderland the Fliegendes Stachelschwein ("Flying Porcupine") due to its defensive firepower.

Sunderlands also proved themselves in the Mediterranean theatre. They flew many evacuation missions during the German seizure of Crete, carrying as many as 82 passengers. One flew the reconnaissance mission to observe the Italian fleet at anchor in Taranto before the famous Royal Navy Fleet Air Arm's torpedo attack on 11 November 1940.

New weapons made the flying boats more deadly in combat. In 1939 during an accidental fratricidal attack, one 100 lb (45 kg) anti-submarine bomb hit the British submarine Snapper doing no more damage than breaking its light bulbs; other bombs had reportedly bounced up and hit their launch aircraft. In early 1943, these ineffective weapons were replaced by Torpex-filled depth charges that would sink to a determined depth and then explode. This eliminated the problem of bounce-back, and the shock wave propagating through the water augmented the explosive effect.

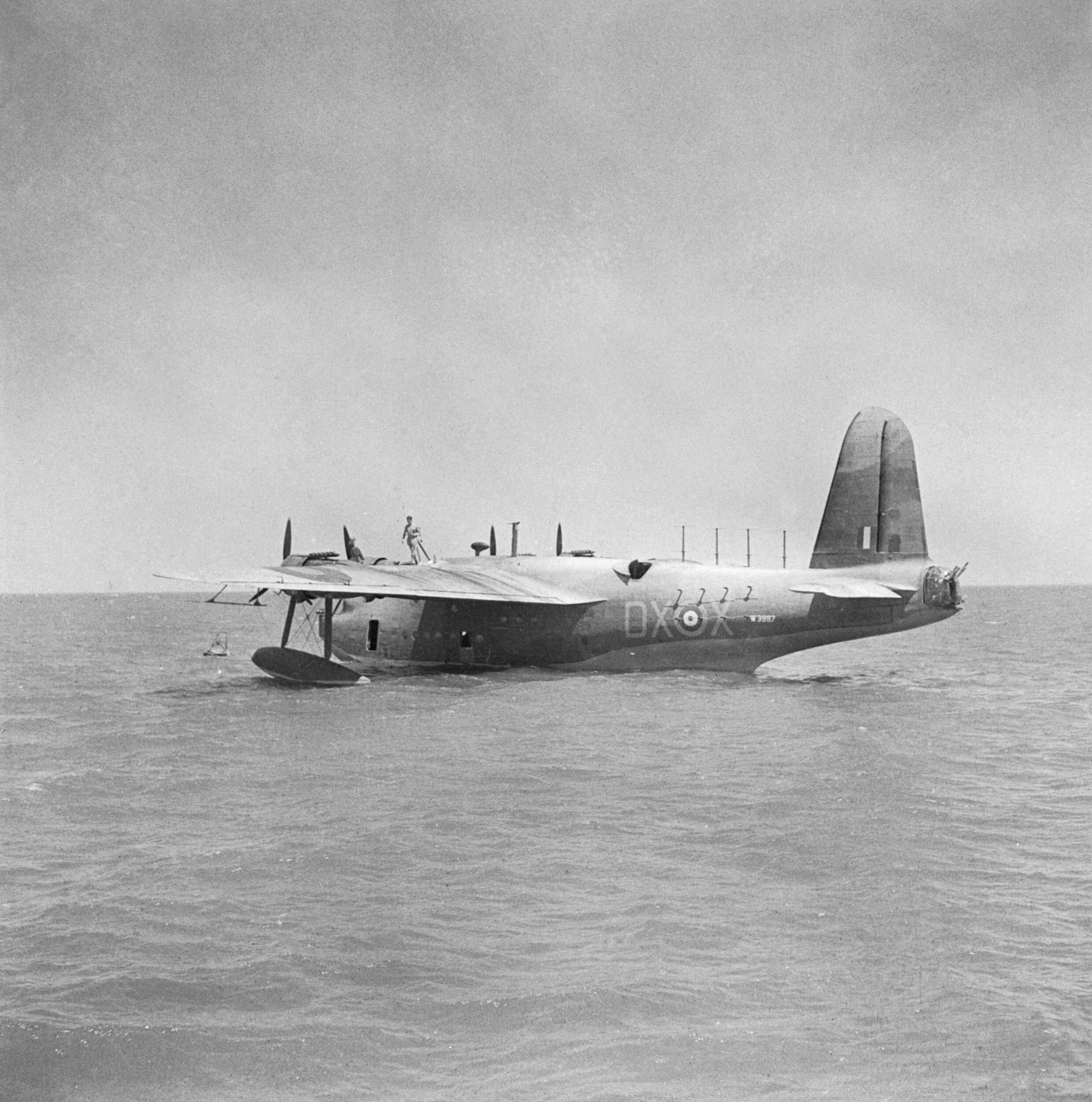
Sunderland Mark II, showing ASV Mark II "stickleback" antennas in front of the tail

While the bright Leigh searchlight was rarely fitted to Sunderlands, ASV Mark II radar enabled the flying boats to attack U-boats on the surface. In response, the German submarines began to carry a radar warning system known formally as "Metox", and informally as the "Cross of Biscay" due to the appearance of its receiving antenna, that was tuned to the ASV frequency and gave the submarines early warning that an aircraft was in the area. Kills fell off drastically until ASV Mark III radar was introduced in early 1943, which operated in the centimetric band and used antennas mounted in blisters under the wings outboard of the floats, instead of the cluttered stickleback aerials. Sunderland Mark IIIs fitted with ASV Mark III were called Sunderland Mark IIIAs. Centimetric radar was invisible to Metox and baffled the Germans at first. Admiral Karl Dönitz, commander of the German U-boat force, suspected that the British were being informed of submarine movements by spies. In August 1943, a captured RAF airman misled the Germans by telling them that the aircraft were homing in on the signals radiated by the Metox, and consequently U-boat commanders were instructed to turn them off.

The Germans responded to Sunderland attacks by fitting some U-boats with one or two 37 mm and twin quad 20 mm flak guns to fire back at their attackers. While Sunderlands could suppress flak to an extent with their nose turret guns, the U-boats' guns had superior range, hitting power and accuracy. Attempting to shoot down Allied aircraft did, however, prolong the U-boat's presence on the surface, which made sinking the vessel easier. Nonetheless, fitting of substantial arrays of anti-aircraft guns temporarily decreased U-boat losses while both Allied aircraft and shipping losses rose. As a countermeasure to the increased defensive armament of the U-boats, the Australians fitted their aircraft in the field with an additional four .303s (7.7 mm) in fixed mounts in the nose, allowing the pilot to add fire while diving on the submarine before bomb release. Most aircraft were similarly modified. The addition of single .50 inch (12.7 mm) flexibly mounted M2 Browning machine guns in the beam hatches behind and above the wing trailing edge also became common.

==== 1943 encounter with Ju 88s ====
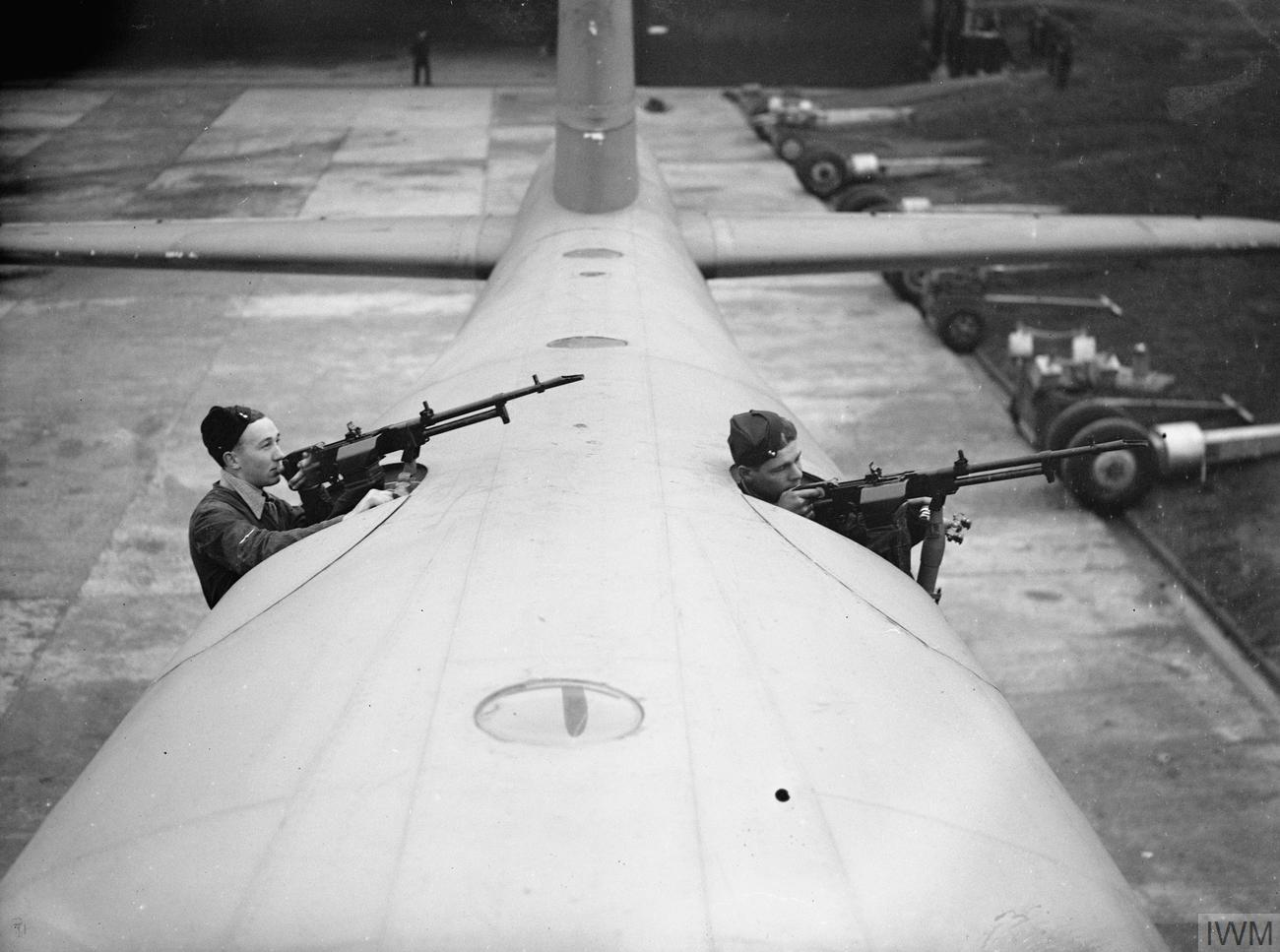
Two airmen demonstrate the dorsal .303in (7.7 mm) Vickers 'K' guns of a Sunderland.

The type's capacity to defend itself was demonstrated in particular by an air battle over the Bay of Biscay on 2 June 1943, when eight Junkers Ju 88Cs attacked a single Sunderland Mk III of No. 461 Squadron RAAF: EJ134, squadron code: "N for Nuts". The 11 crew, (Note: Flight Lieutenant Colin Walker and Pilot Officer W. J. Dowling, pilots; J. C. Amiss; Flying Officer (F/O) K. McD. Simpson, navigator; Sergeant E. C. E. Miles (RAF; killed in action) and Sergeant P. K. Turner, engineers; Flt Sgt E. A. Fuller (RAF) and Flt Sgt S. F. Miller wireless operators; Sgt A. Lane and Sgt L. S. Watson, dorsal gunners, and; Flt Sgt R. Goode (rear gunner).) led by F/Lt Colin Walker, were on an anti-submarine patrol, while also watching for any signs of a missing airliner, BOAC Flight 777. At 1900 hours, the rear gunner saw the Ju 88s, which belonged to V.Kampfgeschwader 40 and were led by Leutnant Friedrich Maeder. Walker ordered the dumping of the bombs and depth charges, and took the engines to full power. Two Ju 88s made simultaneous passes at EJ134 from both sides, scoring hits and disabling one engine, while the pilots fought fires and took the Sunderland through corkscrew manoeuvres. On a third pass, the dorsal turret gunner badly damaged or shot down a Ju 88, although the Sunderland's rear gunner was knocked unconscious.

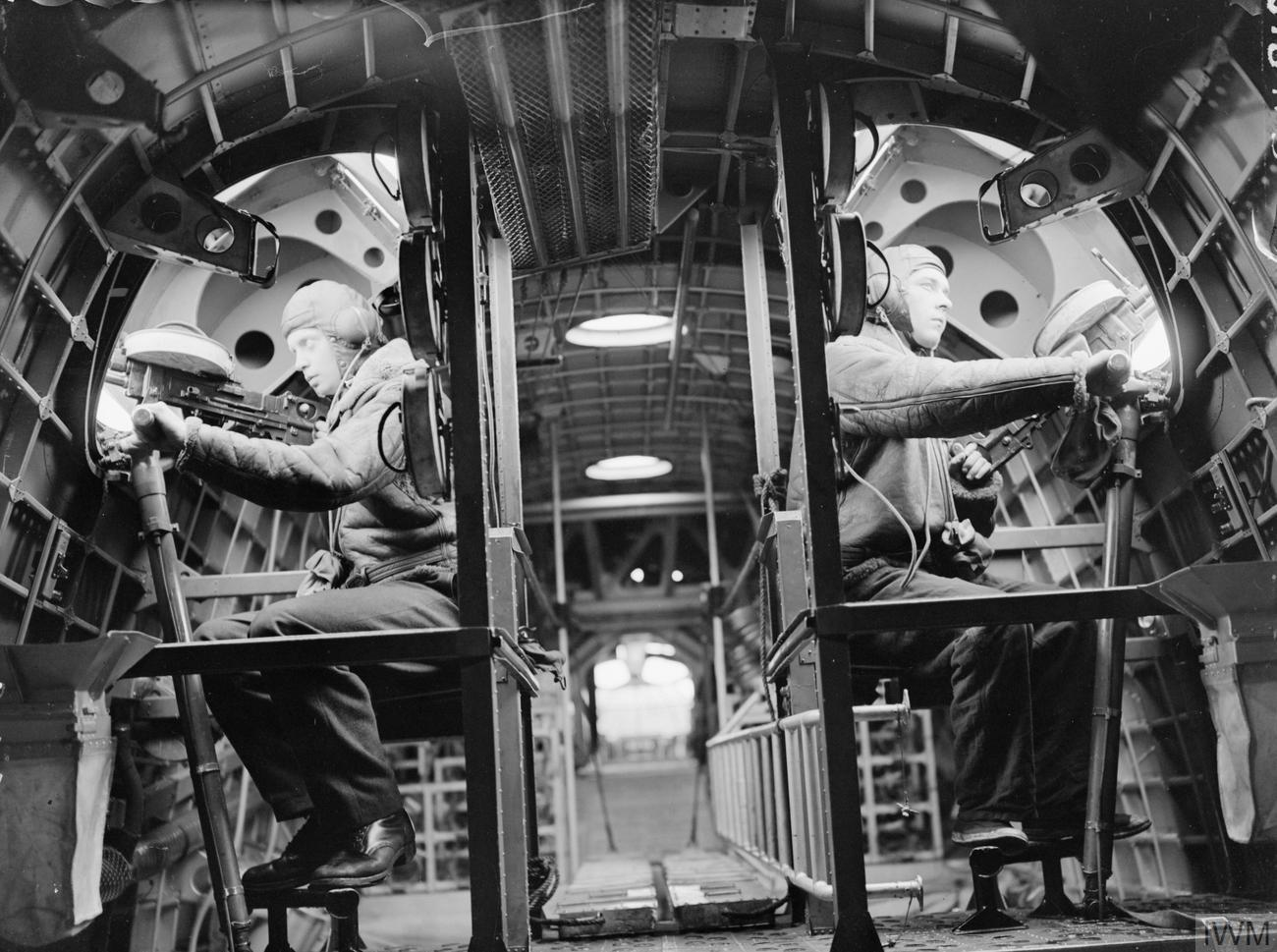
Two gunners in a Short Sunderland Mark I sit at their positions with .303 (7.7 mm) Vickers K-type machine guns, mounted in the upper fuselage hatches.

The next Ju 88 that attacked was hit by fire from the dorsal and nose turrets, and appeared to have been shot down. By this time, one crew member on the Sunderland had been mortally wounded and most of the others were wounded to varying degrees, while the aircraft's radio gear had been destroyed, among other damage. However, the rear gunner had recovered, and when EJ134 was attacked from behind, another Ju 88 was badly damaged and left the fight. The remaining Ju 88s continued to attack and the front gunner damaged one of these, setting its engines on fire. Two more Ju 88s were also damaged and the Germans disengaged. EJ134 was badly damaged and the crew threw everything they could overboard, while nursing the aircraft over the 350-mile (560 km) journey to Britain. At 2248 hours, Walker managed to beach the aircraft at Praa Sands, Cornwall. The 10 surviving crew members were able to wade ashore, while the Sunderland broke up in the surf. Walker received the Distinguished Service Order and several other crew members also received medals. They claimed three Ju 88s destroyed. With the exception of Walker, the crew returned to operations in a new "N for Nuts", which was lost over the Bay of Biscay two months later, in an attack by six Ju 88s. On 2 June 2013, a memorial was dedicated on the green at Praa Sands.

=== Postwar ===
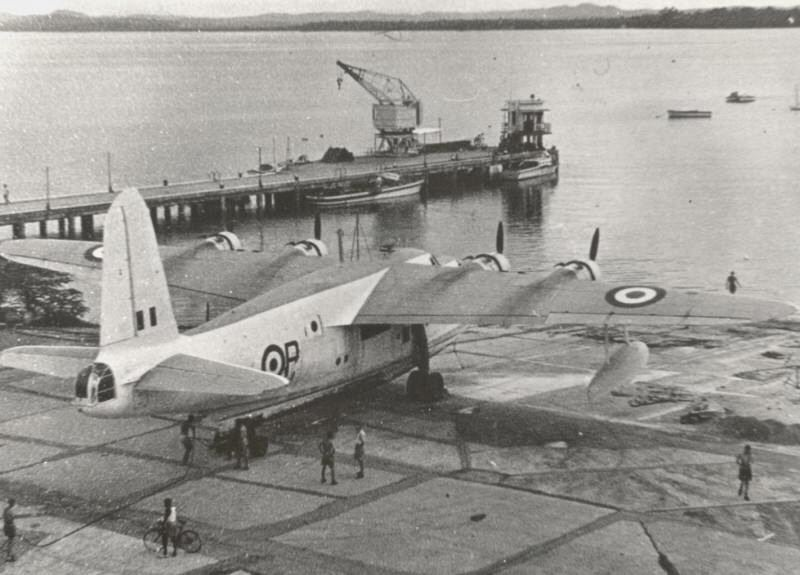
A 205 Squadron Short Sunderland Mark V ML797 "P" at the ramp of RAF Seletar. This particular airframe became the last of its type to retire from active RAF service on 30 June 1959.

At the end of the Second World War, a number of Sunderlands were simply taken out to sea and scuttled. While some RAF installations in West Africa retired older airframe in this way, there are also reports that new Sunderlands built at Belfast were simply taken out to sea and scuttled as there was nothing else to do with them. In Europe the type was removed from service relatively quickly but in the Far East, where well developed runways were less common and large land based maritime patrol aircraft like the new Avro Shackleton could not be used so easily, there was still a need for it, and it remained in service with the RAF Far East Air Force at Singapore until 1959, and with the Royal New Zealand Air Force's No. 5 Squadron RNZAF until 1967. (Note: A former RNZAF Sunderland that is yet to be restored is exhibited at the Museum of Transport and Technology, Auckland.)

During the Berlin Airlift (June 1948 – August 1949) 10 Sunderlands and two transport variants (known as "Hythes") were used to transport goods from Finkenwerder on the Elbe near Hamburg to the isolated city, landing on the Havel river near RAF Gatow until it iced over. The Sunderlands were frequently used for transporting salt, as their airframes were already protected against corrosion from seawater and their control cables were roof-mounted, as opposed to underfloor in most other aircraft. Transporting salt in standard aircraft risked rapid and severe structural corrosion in the event of a spillage. When the Havelsee did freeze over the Sunderland's role was taken by freight-converted Handley Page Halifaxes with salt being carried in panniers fitted under the fuselage to avoid the corrosion problem.

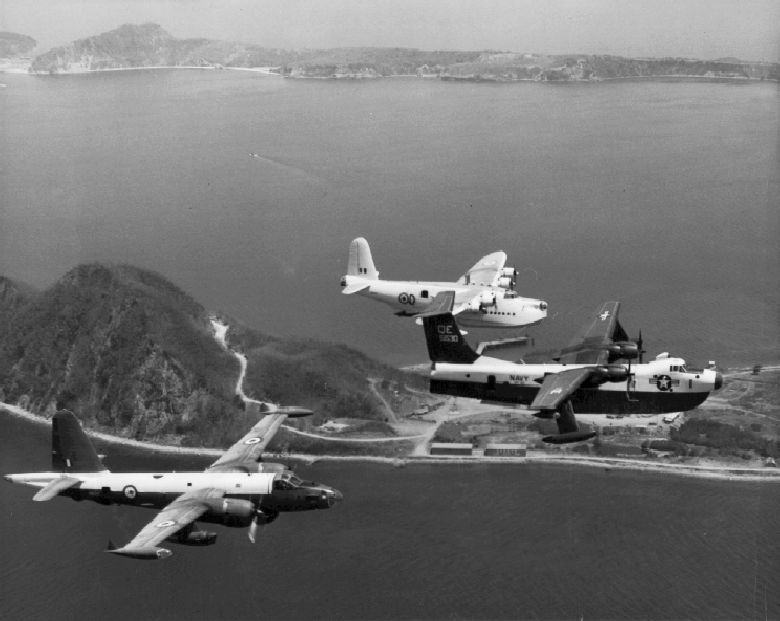
A RNZAF Sunderland MR.5 with a USN Martin P5M Marlin and a RAAF Lockheed P-2 Neptune in 1963.

From mid-1950, RAF Sunderlands also saw service during the Korean War initially with No. 88 Squadron but shortly followed by Nos. 205 and 209 Squadrons. The three squadrons shared the operational task equally with rotational detachments of three or four aircraft and crews based at Iwakuni, Japan. Missions lasting 10 to 13 hours were flown daily throughout the war, and also during the Armistice period that followed, until September 1954. The Sunderland also saw service with the RNZAF until 1967.

The French Navy Escadrille 7FE, which received Sunderlands when it was formed in 1943 as No. 343 Squadron RAF, continued to operate them until December 1960, the last unit to operate Sunderlands in the northern hemisphere.

== Variants ==
=== Prototype ===
The first S.25, now named the Sunderland Mark I, flew from the River Medway on 16 October 1937 with Shorts' chief test pilot, John Lankester Parker at the controls. The deeper hull and installation of nose and tail turrets gave the Sunderland a considerably different appearance from the Empire flying boats. The prototype was fitted with Bristol Pegasus X engines, each providing 950 hp (709 kW ), as the planned Pegasus XXII engines of 1,010 hp (753 kW) were not available at the time.

The 37 mm gun, originally intended as a primary anti-submarine weapon, was dropped from the plans during the prototype phase and replaced with a Nash & Thompson FN-11 nose turret mounting a single .303-inch (7.7 mm) Vickers GO machine gun. The turret could be winched back into the nose, revealing a small "deck" and demountable marine bollard used during mooring manoeuvres on the water. The change of armament in the nose to the much lighter gun moved the centre of gravity rearwards.

After the first series of flights, the prototype was modified to have a wing that was swept 4.25° to the rear, thereby moving the centre of pressure into a more reasonable position in relation to the new centre of gravity. This left the engines and wing floats canted out from the aircraft's centreline. Although the wing loading was much higher than that of any previous Royal Air Force flying boat, a new flap system kept the takeoff run to a reasonable length.

=== Sunderland Mark I ===
The RAF received its first Sunderland Mark I in June 1938 when the second production aircraft (L2159) was flown to 230 Squadron at RAF Seletar, Singapore. By the outbreak of war in Europe, in September 1939, RAF Coastal Command was operating 40 Sunderlands.

The main offensive load was up to 2,000 lb (910 kg) of bombs (usually 250 or 500 lb [110 or 230 kg]), mines (1,000 lb or 450 kg) or other stores that were hung on traversing racks under the wing centre section (to and from the bomb room in the fuselage). Later, depth charges (usually 250 lb) were added. By late 1940, two Vickers K machine guns had been added to new hatches that were inserted into the upper sides of the fuselage just aft of the wing, with appropriate slipstream deflectors. A second gun was added to the nose turret. New constant speed propellers and deicing boots were installed as well during 1940.

The Sunderland had difficulty in landing and taking off from rough water, but, other than in the open sea, it could be handled onto and off a short chop, by a skilled pilot. Many rescues were made, early in the war, of crews that were in the Channel having abandoned or ditched their aircraft, or abandoned their ship. During May 1941, during the Battle of Crete Sunderlands transported as many as 82 armed men from place to place in one load. Steep ocean swells were never attempted, however a calm ocean could be suitable for landing and takeoff.

Beginning in October 1941, Sunderlands were fitted with ASV Mark II "Air to Surface Vessel" radar. This was a primitive low frequency radar system operating at a wavelength of 1.5 m, that used a row of four prominent "stickleback" Yagi antennas on top of the rear fuselage, two rows of four smaller aerials on either side of the fuselage beneath the stickleback antennas, and a single receiving aerial mounted under each wing outboard of the float and angled outward.

A total of 75 Sunderland Mark Is were built: 60 at Shorts' factories at Rochester and Belfast, Northern Ireland, and 15 by Blackburn Aircraft at Dumbarton.

=== Sunderland Mark II ===
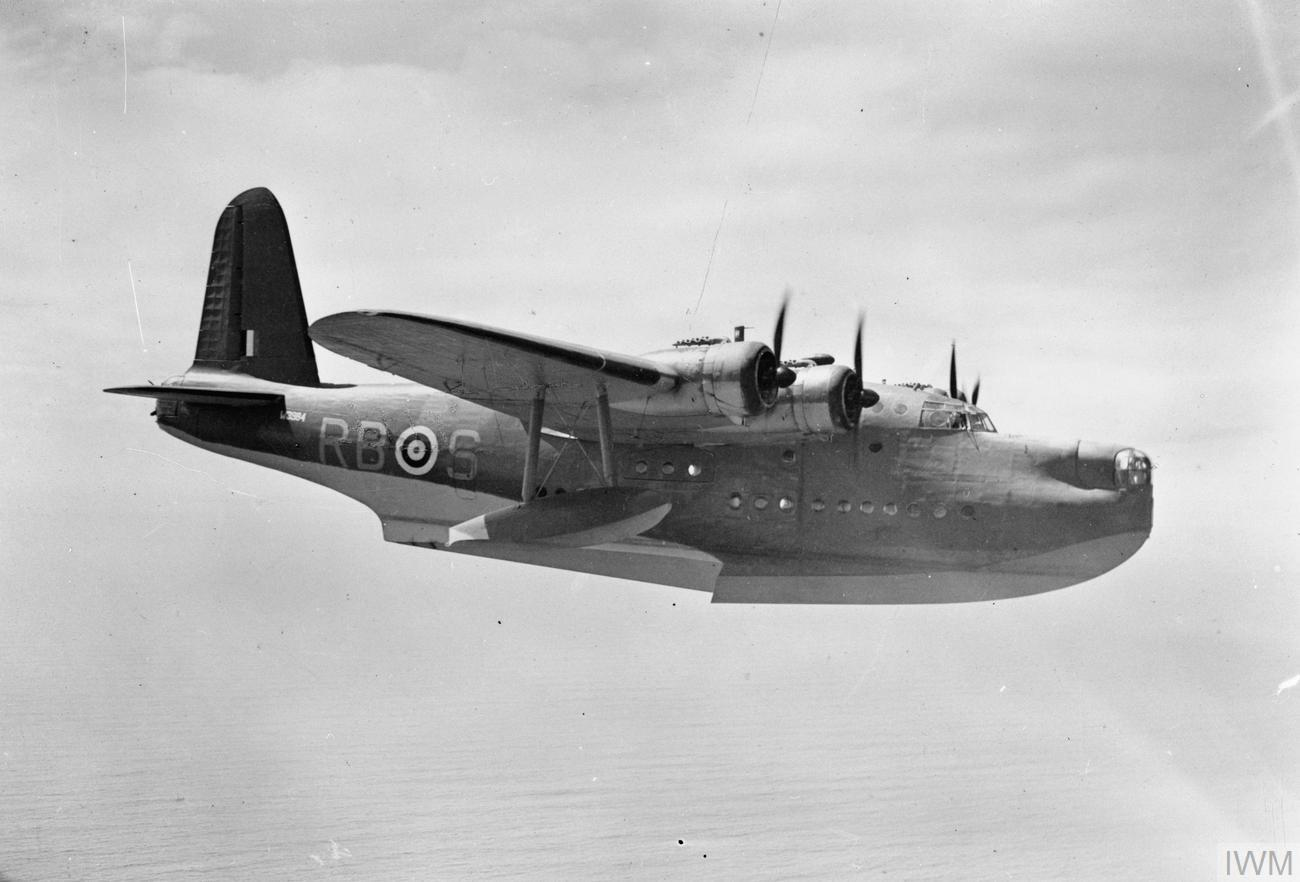
Mark II in flight, showing the abrupt, sharp-edged hull "step" that the first two marks possessed. Later marks used a smooth, curved step design.

In August 1941, production moved on to the Sunderland Mark II which used Pegasus XVIII engines with two-speed superchargers, producing 1,065 hp (794 kW) each.

The tail turret was changed to an FN.4A turret that retained the four .303 guns of its predecessor but provided twice the ammunition capacity with 1,000 rounds per gun. Late production Mark IIs also had an FN.7 dorsal turret, mounted offset to the right just behind the wings and fitted with twin .303 machine guns. The hand held guns behind the wing were removed in these versions.

Only 43 Mark IIs were built, five of these by Blackburn.

=== Sunderland Mark III ===
Production quickly changed in December 1941 to the Sunderland Mark III, which featured a revised hull configuration which had been tested on a Mark I the previous June. This modification improved seaworthiness, which had suffered as the weight of the Sunderland increased with new marks and field changes. In earlier Sunderlands, the hull "step" that allows a flying boat to "unstick" from the surface of the sea was an abrupt one, but in the Mk III it was a curve upwards from the forward hull line.

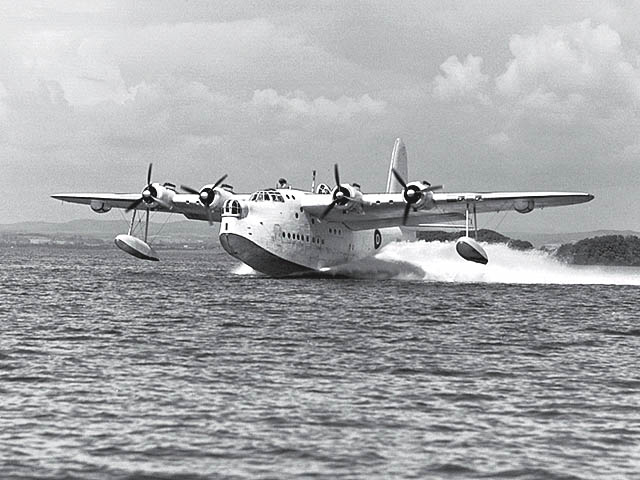
A Mark IIIA with Mk III engines and bomb windows, but Mk V radar blisters and nose guns

The Mark III turned out to be the definitive Sunderland variant, with 461 built. Most were built by Shorts at Rochester and Belfast, a further 35 at a new (but temporary) (Note: The agreement with the Friends of the Lake District for the factory to be constructed on Windermere was conditional on its being dismantled when no longer needed. This agreement was kept and not a trace exists of the factory which had once boasted some of the largest aircraft hangars in the world.) Shorts plant at White Cross Bay, Windermere; while 170 were built by Blackburn Aircraft. The Sunderland Mark III proved to be one of the RAF Coastal Command's major weapons against the U-boats, along with the Consolidated Catalina.

As the U-boats began to use Metox passive receivers the ASV Mk II radar gave away the presence of aircraft and the number of sightings diminished drastically. The RAF response was to upgrade to the ASV Mk III, which operated in the 10 cm band, with antennas that could be faired into fewer more streamlined blisters. During the Mk III's life there were a large number of almost continuous improvements made, including the ASV Mk IIIA and four more machine guns in a fixed position in the wall of the forward fuselage just behind the turret (developed on RAAF aircraft first) with a simple bead and ring sight for the pilot. Sunderlands with upgraded ASV Mk III equipment were designated Mk IIIA.

Despite the 14-hour-long patrols expected of their crews, early Sunderland gunners were provided with only 500 rounds of ammunition each. Later 1,000 round ammunition boxes were installed in the turrets. The beam hatch guns were removed from Mk II aircraft but Mk IIIs and then Mk Is gained much more capable .50 (12.7 mm) guns, one each side.

Offensive weapons loads increased too. The introduction of the hydrostatically fused 250 lb (110 kg) depth charge meant that additional weapons could be carried on the floor of the bomb room in wooden restraints, along with ammunition boxes of 10 and 25 lb (5 and 11 kg) anti-personnel bombs that could be hand launched from various hatches to harass U-boat crews otherwise manning the twin 37 and dual quadruple 20 mm cannons with which U-boats were fitted.

As radar detection became more effective there were more night patrols to catch U-boats on the surface charging their batteries. Attacking in the dark was a problem that was solved by carrying one inch (25.4 mm), electrically initiated flares and dropping them out of the rear chute of the aircraft as it got close to the surface vessel. Sunderlands were never fitted with Leigh lights.

=== Sunderland Mark IV ===
The Sunderland Mark IV was an outgrowth of the 1942 Air Ministry Specification R.8/42, for a generally improved Sunderland with more powerful Bristol Hercules engines, better defensive armament and other enhancements. The new Sunderland was intended for service in the Pacific. Although initially developed and two prototypes built as the "Sunderland Mark IV" it was different enough from the Sunderland line to be given a different name, the S.45 "Seaford".

Relative to the Mark III, the Mark IV had a stronger wing, larger tailplanes and a longer fuselage with some changes in hull form for better performance in the water. The armament was heavier with .50 inch (12.7 mm) machine guns and 20 mm Hispano cannon. The changes were so substantial that the new aircraft was redesignated the Short Seaford. Thirty production examples were ordered; the first delivered too late to see combat and only eight production Seafords were completed and never got beyond operational trials with the RAF.

=== Sunderland Mark V ===
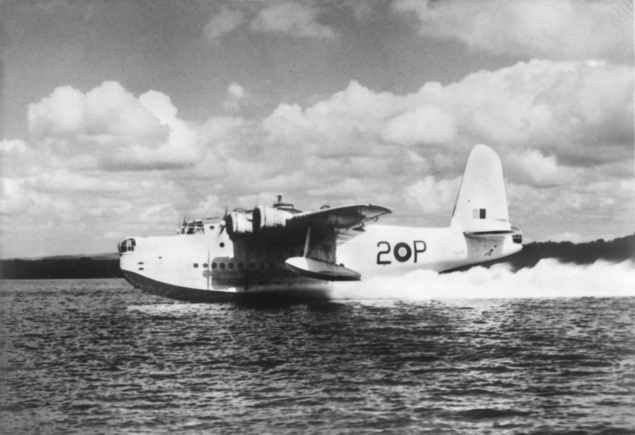
A Sunderland Mark V operated by No. 461 Squadron RAAF

The next production version was the Sunderland Mark V, which evolved out of crew concerns over the lack of power of the Pegasus engines. The weight creep (partly due to the addition of radar) that afflicted the Sunderland had resulted in running the Pegasus engines at combat power as a normal procedure and the overburdened engines had to be replaced regularly.

Australian Sunderland crews suggested that the Pegasus engines be replaced by Pratt & Whitney R-1830 Twin Wasp engines. The 14-cylinder engines provided 1,200 hp (895 kW) each and were already in use on RAF Consolidated Catalinas and Douglas Dakotas, and so logistics and maintenance were straightforward. Two Mark IIIs were taken off the production lines in early 1944 and fitted with the American engines. Trials were conducted in early 1944 and the conversion proved all that was expected.

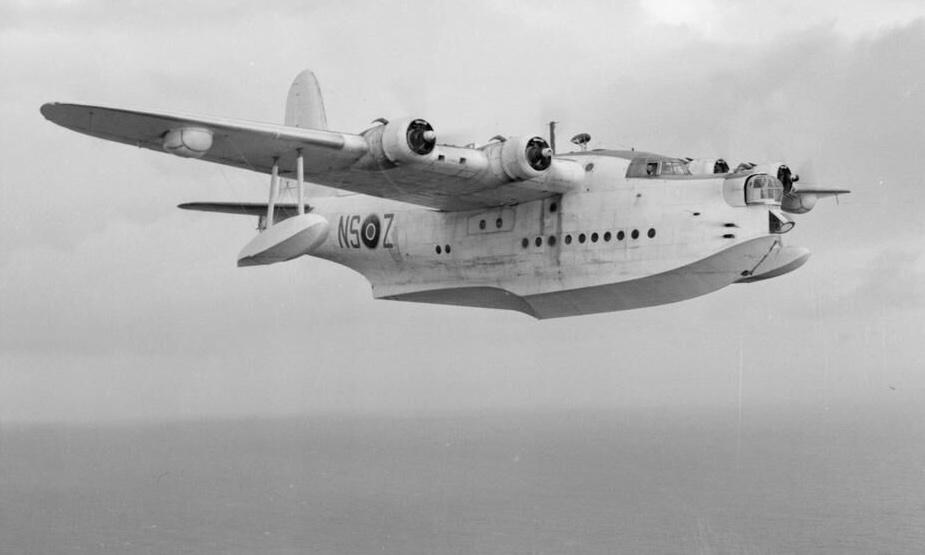
A Sunderland Mk V. The bulges under the outer wings are the ASV6 radar antennae

The new engines with Hamilton Standard's new Hydromatic constant-speed fully feathering propellers provided greater performance with no real penalty in range. In particular, a Twin Wasp Sunderland could stay airborne if two engines were knocked out on the same wing while, in similar circumstances, a standard Mark III would steadily lose altitude. Production was switched to the Twin Wasp version and the first Mark V reached operational units in February 1945. Defensive armament fits were similar to those of the Mark III, but the Mark V was equipped with new centimetric ASV Mark VI C radar that had been used on some of the last production Mark IIIs as well.

A total of 155 Sunderland Mark Vs were built with another 33 Mark IIIs converted to Mark V specification. With the end of the war, large contracts for the Sunderland were cancelled and the last of these flying boats was delivered in June 1946, with a total production of 777 aircraft completed.

=== Transport variants ===
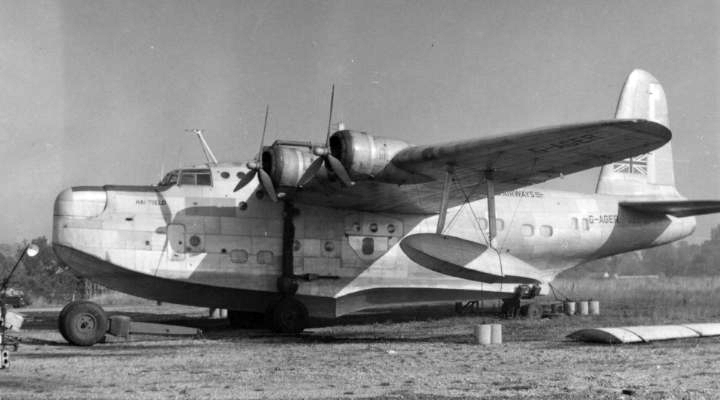
Sunderland III of Aquila Airways at Hamble Beach in 1955. This aircraft was the first transport conversion that had served BOAC 1943–1948, it still carried the name given to it by BOAC Hadfield.

In late 1942, the British Overseas Airways Corporation (BOAC) obtained six Sunderland Mark IIIs, which had been de-militarised on the production line, for service as mail carriers to Nigeria and India, with accommodation for either 22 passengers with 2 tons of freight or 16 passengers with 3 tons of freight. Armament was removed, the gun positions being faired over, and simple seating fitted in place of the bunks. As such they were operated by BOAC and the RAF jointly from Poole to Lagos and Calcutta. Six more Sunderland IIIs were obtained in 1943. Minor modifications to the engine angles and flight angle resulted in a significant increase in the cruise speed, which was a relatively unimportant issue for the combat Sunderlands. In late 1944, the RNZAF acquired four new Sunderland Mk IIIs already configured for transport duties. In the immediate postwar period, these were used by New Zealand's National Airways Corporation to link South Pacific Islands in the "Coral Route" before TEAL Short Sandringhams took over after 1947.

=== Post-war civilian use ===
At the war's end BOAC obtained more Mark IIIs and gradually came up with better accommodation for its passengers, in three configurations. Bench seats were removed, and civil-standard seating installed: The H.1 configuration had 16 seats on one deck, while the H.2 had an additional promenade deck, and the H.3 had 24 seats, or sleeping berths for 16. These conversions were given the name Hythe and BOAC operated 29 of them by the end of the war. In February 1946, the first of these, G-AGJM, made a 35,313-mile route survey from Poole to Australia, New Zealand, Hong Kong, Shanghai and Tokyo in 206 flying hours. It was the first British civil flying boat to visit China and Japan.

A more refined civilian conversion of the Sunderland was completed by the manufacturer as the postwar Short Sandringham. The Sandringham Mk. I used Pegasus engines while the Mk. II used Twin Wasp engines.

== Operators ==
=== Military operators ===
Australia

- Royal Australian Air Force

No. 10 Squadron RAAF
No. 40 Squadron RAAF
No. 461 Squadron RAAF

Canada
Royal Canadian Air Force

No. 422 Squadron RCAF
No. 423 Squadron RCAF

France

- French Navy

No. 343 Squadron RAF, later Escadrille 7FE
Flottille 1FE
Flottille 7F
Flottille 27F
Escadrilles 12S
Escadrilles 50S
Escadrilles 53S

New Zealand

- Royal New Zealand Air Force

No. 5 Squadron RNZAF
No. 490 Squadron RNZAF

- New Zealand Territorial Air Force

No. 6 Squadron TAF

Norway
Norwegian Air Force

No. 330 Squadron RNoAF

Portugal

- Portuguese Navy

South Africa

- South African Air Force

No. 35 Squadron SAAF

United Kingdom

- Royal Air Force

No. 88 Squadron RAF
No. 95 Squadron RAF
No. 119 Squadron RAF
No. 201 Squadron RAF
No. 202 Squadron RAF
No. 204 Squadron RAF
No. 205 Squadron RAF
No. 209 Squadron RAF

No. 210 Squadron RAF
No. 228 Squadron RAF
No. 230 Squadron RAF
No. 240 Squadron RAF
No. 246 Squadron RAF
No. 259 Squadron RAF
No. 270 Squadron RAF
No. 235 Operational Conversion Unit RAF
Air Headquarters Iraq Communication Flight

=== Commercial operators ===
- Aerolíneas Argentinas
- Ansett Flying Boat Services flew the Sunderland and its Sandringham variant from Rose Bay on Sydney Harbour to Lord Howe Island until 10 September 1974
- Antilles Air Boats (US Virgin Islands)
- Aquila Airways
- British Overseas Airways Corporation
- Compañía Aeronáutica Uruguaya S.A. (CAUSA)
- Compañía Argentina de Aeronavegación Dodero
- Det Norske Luftfartselskap (DNL) – Norwegian Aviation Company (continued as SAS)
- New Zealand National Airways Corporation
- Qantas (orig. Queensland and Northern Territory Aerial Services)
- Trans Oceanic Airways
- TEAL (Tasman Empire Airways Ltd, New Zealand)

== Surviving aircraft ==
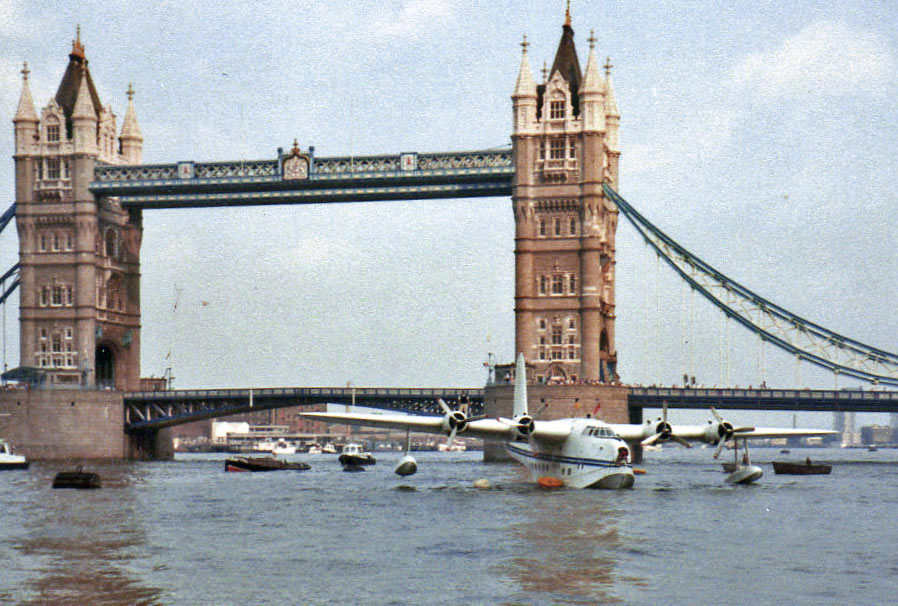
G-BJHS (ML814), the last flying Short Sunderland moored near Tower Bridge, before it moved to Fantasy of Flight in Florida, United States.

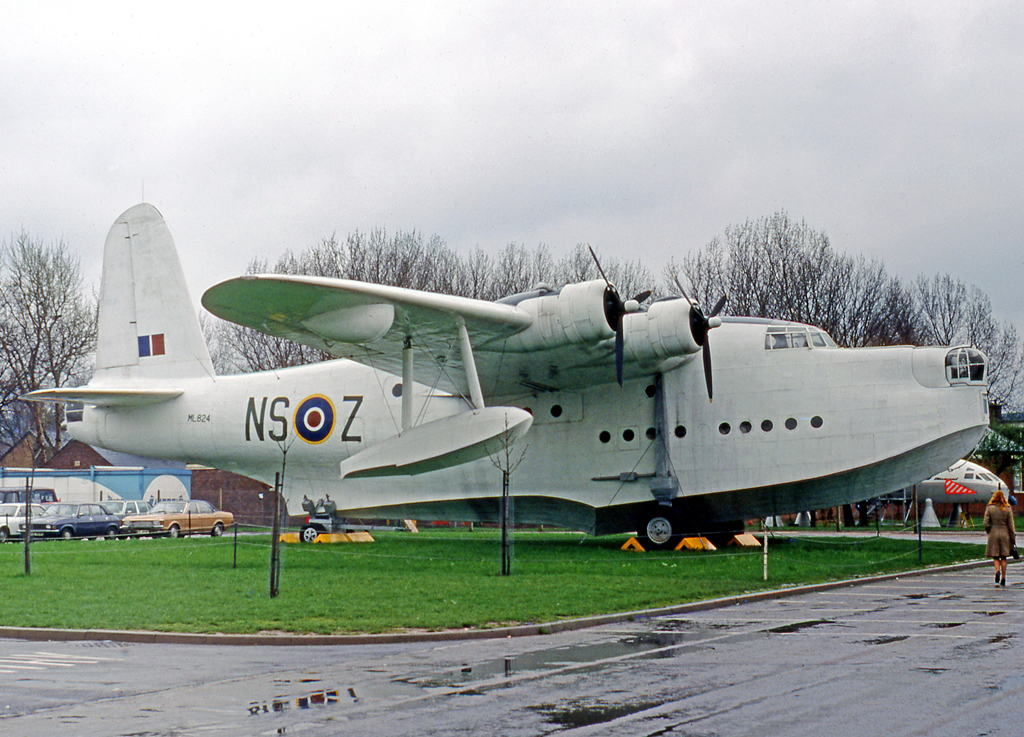
Sunderland V ML824 displayed at the Royal Air Force Museum London at Hendon wearing the codes of No. 201 Squadron RAF. Now indoors in Hangar 1.

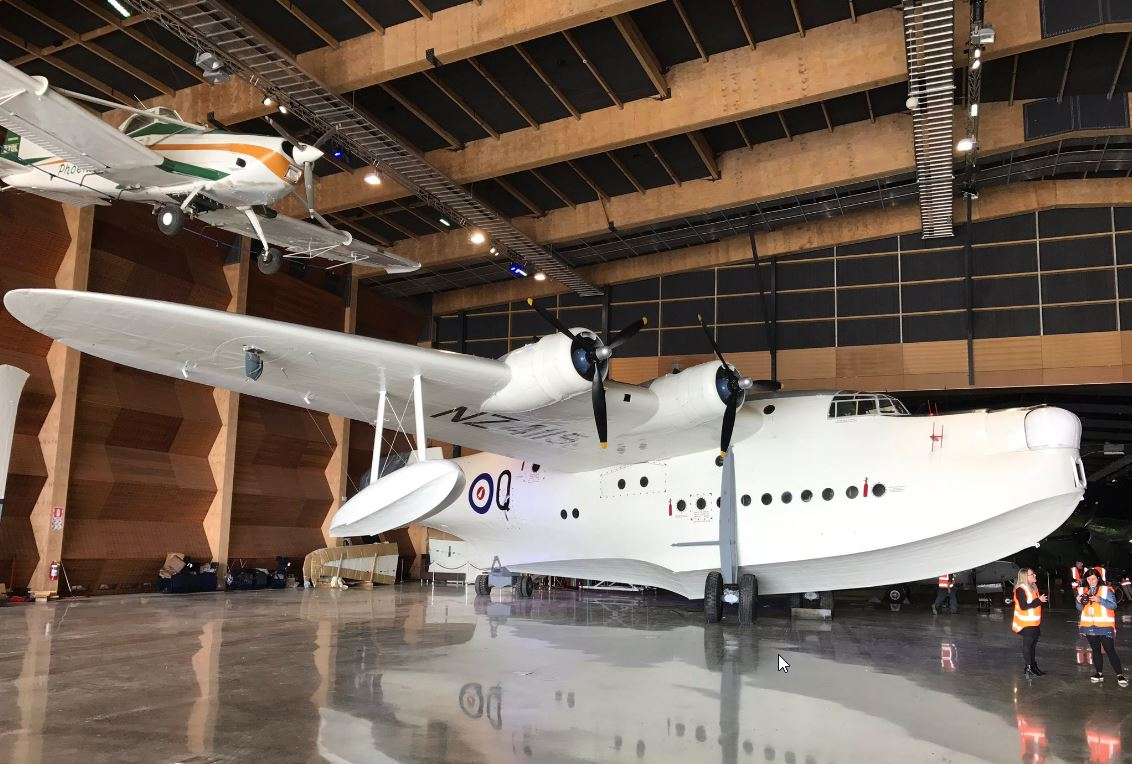
Sunderland in the MOTAT Aviation Display Hall, Auckland

- ML814 a Mark III, converted to Mark V and then for passenger work, is on display in Kermit Weeks' Fantasy of Flight in Florida, US. It was bought in 1993, and flown across the Atlantic from the UK. According to the FoF website ML814 is the "last 4-engined passenger flying boat that can still fly." (Note: Two 4-engined Martin Mars flying boats remain in or near flyable condition, but they are cargo and water-bombing planes.) Formerly RNZAF NZ4108 – SH.974b MR.5 went to Airlines of New South Wales as VH-BRF "Islander" and was converted to a Sandringham in Australia. Airlines of New South Wales subsequently taken over by the major Australian airline Ansett and became Ansett Flying Boat Services and operated from Rose Bay, Sydney, Australia until 1974. Currently it is the last four-engined passenger flying boat to have crossed a major ocean. Although it is reported to be maintained in airworthy condition, it has not been flown since 1996 and remained on display in the museum's main hangar for the majority of its time there, being towed to the ramp for various outdoor events in the 21st century.

In addition a few aircraft have been preserved as static museum exhibits.

- ML824 is on display in Hangar 1 at the RAF Museum London at Hendon, which acquired it in 1971. The interior of the aircraft is accessible to visitors. Originally preserved at Pembroke Dock after final service with the French Navy. It made its last flight from Lanveoc Poulmic, near Brest to Pembroke on 24 Mar 1961.
- ML796 is on display at Imperial War Museum Duxford in Cambridgeshire.
- NJ203 RAF Short Sunderland IV/Seaford I S-45 NJ203. 1947 Converted to Short Solent 3 by Short Bros Belfast. 1949 BOAC G-AKNP "City of Cardiff". 1951 Trans Oceanic Airways of Australia as VH-TOB "Star of Papua". 1953 South Pacific Air Lines as N9946F "Isle of Tahiti". Last flew 1958. 1958 Howard Hughes – Hughes Tool Company. Since 1990 it has been on display at the Oakland Aviation Museum, California, USA.
- NZ4111 located at the Chatham Islands. Serving with No. 5 Squadron 6 RNZAF March-11 April 1959, coded KN-D; it took part in a flypast to mark the opening of the Auckland Harbour Bridge on 30 May 1959. On 4 November 1959, it was badly damaged in an accident in the Chatham Islands when the Sunderland hit rocks in Te Whanga Lagoon while taxiing and sank in shallow water. It was stripped of usable parts and written off RNZAF books on 9 December 1959. This was the first of the RNZAF Mk.5 Sunderlands to be written off due to damage. The fuselage was broken into major components for use on a farm; the owners are now reassembling the hull and fuselage sections.
- NZ4112 – Hulk used by Hobsonville Yacht Club until 1970, then scrapped. Cockpit and front of aircraft transported to the Ferrymead Heritage Park for the Ferrymead Aeronautical Society Inc. Christchurch, New Zealand.
- NZ4115 SH.1552b MR.5. Previously SZ584 and BOAC G-AHJR is on display at the Museum of Transport and Technology in Auckland, New Zealand. The interior and cockpit having been extensively restored and hull repairs some reskinning having taken place to airworthy standards and the exterior repainted in NZ4115's later RNZAF maritime scheme Q for Quebec is now displayed inside the MOTAT Aviation Display Hall with Short Bros sister TEAL Short Solent ZK-AMO. Q for Quebec's turrets, armaments and radar and radar domes are being refitted while on display.

Sunderland T9044 was discovered on the seabed off Pembroke Dock in Wales in 2000. The site is protected and recovery of the aircraft is ongoing.

The wreck located by Calshot Divers at Calshot in 2010 is very likely to be that of ML883 and not PP118 as originally thought. This wreck site is awkward to dive due to its proximity to the Fawley Refinery, Solent shipping lane, Calshot RNLI station and public slipway.

== Specifications (Sunderland III) ==
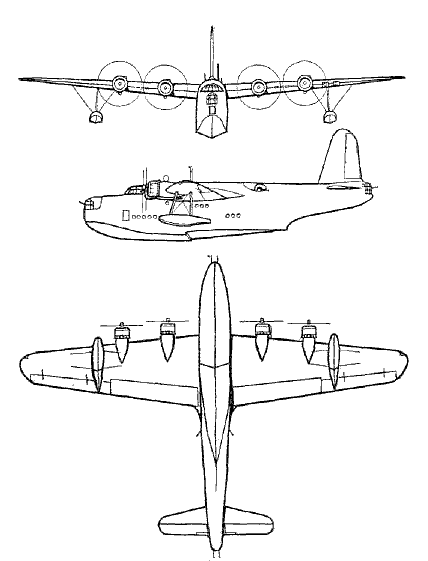
Sunderland I/II 3-view drawing

Data from Jane's Fighting Aircraft of World War II, The Short Sunderland & Bombers of World War II.

General characteristics

- Crew: 9–11 (two pilots, radio operator, navigator, engineer, bomb-aimer, three to five gunners)
- Length: 85 ft 4 in (26.01 m)
- Wingspan: 112 ft 9.5 in (34.379 m)
- Height: 32 ft 10.5 in (10.020 m)
- Wing area: 1,487 sq ft (138.1 m^{2})
- Airfoil: Göttingen 436 mod
- Empty weight: 34,500 lb (15,649 kg)
- Gross weight: 58,000 lb (26,308 kg)
- Fuel capacity: 2,552 imp gal (11,600 L)
- Powerplant: 4 × Bristol Pegasus XVIII 9-cylinder air-cooled radial piston engines, 1,065 hp (794 kW) each
- Propellers: 3-bladed de Havilland constant-speed propellers, 12 ft 9 in (3.89 m) diameter

Performance

- Maximum speed: 210 mph (340 km/h, 180 kn) at 6,500 ft (2,000 m)
- Cruise speed: 178 mph (286 km/h, 155 kn) at 5,000 ft (1,500 m)
- Range: 1,780 mi (2,860 km, 1,550 nmi)
- Endurance: around 13 hours
- Service ceiling: 17,200 ft (5,200 m)
- Rate of climb: 720 ft/min (3.7 m/s)
- Wing loading: 39 lb/sq ft (190 kg/m^{2})
- Power/mass: 0.073 hp/lb (0.120 kW/kg)

Armament

- Guns:
  - up to 12 × 0.303 in (7.7 mm) Browning machine guns – two fixed on each side of the nose firing forwards (often removed), two in a Nash & Thompson FN.11 nose turret, four in an FN.4a tail turret (which doubled the ammunition capacity of the earlier FN.13), and two in an optional FN.7 dorsal turret which replaced the flexible guns fired from open dorsal/beam hatches in the Mk.Is.
  - On some aircraft Browning 0.5 in (12.7 mm) machine guns replaced the fixed forward firing .303s.
- Bombs: up to 2,000 lb (910 kg) of bombs, mines and depth charges internally, winched out under the wings through hatches in the fuselage sides.

Avionics

- ASV Mk.II or Mk.III centimetric radar (the latter from early 1943)

== See also ==
- Saro A.33
- Short Sunderland in New Zealand service

Related development

- Short Empire
- Short Sandringham
- Short Seaford

Aircraft of comparable role, configuration, and era

- Chyetverikov MDR-3
- Consolidated PB2Y Coronado
- Kawanishi H8K "Emily"
- Sikorsky VS-44
- Tupolev MTB-2

Related lists

- List of aircraft of the Royal Air Force
- List of aircraft of World War II
- List of flying boats and floatplanes
