= No. 343 Squadron RAF =

No. 343 (Flotille 7E) Squadron RAF
- Active: 29 November 1943 – 27 November 1945
- Country: United Kingdom
- Allegiance: Free French Forces
- Branch: Royal Air Force
- Nickname(s): Flotille 7E

Insignia
- Squadron Badge heraldry: None
- Squadron code: None

No. 343 Squadron was a Free French anti-submarine patrol squadron given a Royal Air Force squadron number during World War II.

== History ==
The squadron was formed at Dakar, Senegal, on 29 November 1943 from Flotille 7E and equipped with British Sunderland flying boats. It was under RAF control until 27 November 1945 when it disbanded upon reversion to French control.

== Aircraft operated ==
Aircraft operated by No. 343 Squadron RAF
From	To	Aircraft	Variant
Nov 1943	Nov 1945	Short Sunderland	III
