= George Volkert =

British aircraft designer

George Rudolph Volkert CBE FRAeS (4 July 1891 – 16 May 1978) was a British aircraft designer. Working for Handley Page.he became its chief designer.

== Early life ==
George was born in Fulham to Charles Fredrick Karl Volkert and Caecilie Volkert (daughter of Friedrich Chrysander, the 19th century musicologist). His mother died on 24 December 1922. He grew up at 'St John's', 12 Grange Road, W4.

His sister Cecily married Flying Officer Bernard de Nevers on Tuesday 8 March 1927 at St Mark's Church in Peaslake in the Surrey Hills to . (Note: In 1950 Bernard, as head of the publisher Alfred Lengnick & Co, asked the composer Sir Malcolm Arnold to write a piece which became his 'English Dances', later the theme of What the Papers Say) His father died on 7 December 1929 aged 76. His brother Fred died on 11 July 1941, aged 48, in Buckinghamshire.

He studied at mechanical engineering at the Northampton Institute in London (now City University London) qualifying in July 1910.

After being caught driving a motorcycle without rear lights at Mickleham, Surrey, he was fined February 1914. The same week he was fined 20s at Acton Police Court, for driving at 29 miles an hour in a Bentley on the High Road in Chiswick. The Bentley is currently still in operation in Sussex.

== Career ==
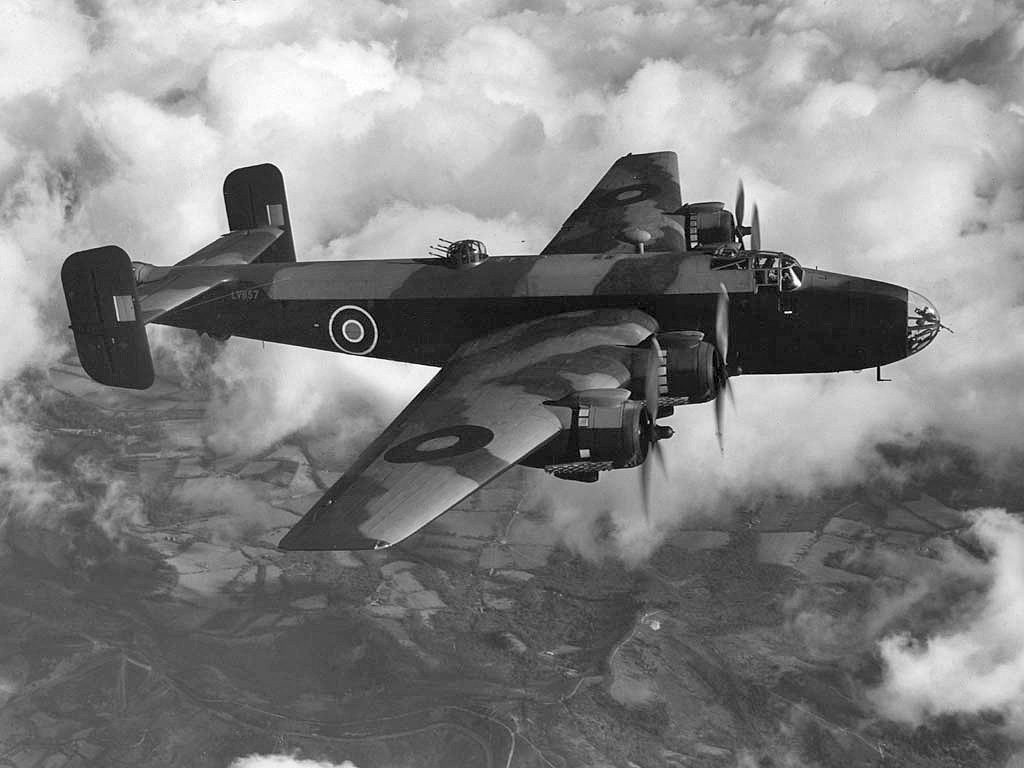
Handley Page Halifax; 6,178 Halifaxes were built

=== Handley Page ===
He joined Handley Page in 1912, becoming head of the design department, when only 21. Post war, demand for aircraft dropped and Handley Page was able to release him in 1921 to go to Japan as part of the Sempill Mission to build up Japan's naval aviation. S. Richards took his place at Handley Page. In 1923 he became Chief Designer of Handley Page. Handley Page had its design department at Woodley, Berkshire. In May 1924, he was given the Order of the Rising Sun by Japan.

After his return to Handley Page in 1924, Volkert started work on the Handley Page Hare and Handley Page Heyford heavy night bomber. Volkert then designed the large HP.42 airliners for Imperial Airways that flew long distance from the UK to parts of the Empire.

The Handley Page Hampden was designed in 1933, first flew on 21 July 1936, and entered squadron service with No's 49, 50 and 83 RAF Squadrons by the end of 1938.

Volkert had responsibility for the design of the Handley Page Halifax bomber, assisted in various aspects by Gustav Lachmann, J.W.Ratcliffe, and R.S.Stafford. The Halifax first flew on 25 October 1939.

On Monday 20 April 1942 a programme on the BBC Forces Programme, at 8pm, was devoted to his work as an aircraft designer, notably of RAF four-engined bombers.

In early 1944, 1,200 Halifaxes were produced in six months. Two-fifths of Britain's heavy bombers in World War II were Halifaxes. It entered service with 35 Sqn on 23 November 1940 at RAF Linton-on-Ouse, carrying out its first night-raid on 11 March 1942 over Le Havre. Most of the Halifaxes flown from England were with the RCAF in North Yorkshire as No. 6 Group RCAF.

== Personal life ==
He married Violet Elizabeth Haley, of Hurlingham, on 21 July 1928 in Isleworth, in Brentford); at the time he lived in Grove Park, Hounslow. They had a son Alan Charles (born on 15 January 1937) and a daughter Jane (born on 7 November 1938), when living at 42 Beaufort Road in Ealing (a few hundred metres east of Hanger Lane, the North Circular Road). Nearby was the home of Prof J.D. McGee, the Australian inventor of the television camera.

By 1975 he had retired to Spain. He had interests in orchids and heating methods. He died in Spain aged 88.

His wife died on 3 February 1990 at Mayfield.

His son Alan was on married Saturday 11 July 1970 at Westerham church to Lindsey Richards, daughter of Terence Charles Richards, (the chief geophysicist of BP) of The Burgage in Westerham, where the reception was held. One of the bridesmaids was Alan's sister Jane, and the vicar was Canon Aidan Chapman. At the time, George lived in Wonersh in Surrey, and had built a house in Benal Madena and latterly an apartment in Fuengirola in Spain. Alan died on 30 September 1995, having lived on Vale Road in Mayfield and Five Ashes in the north of East Sussex.

He has two surviving granddaughters Louise (2 January 1971), who gained a Chemistry degree from Queen Mary College in 1992, and Rosalie (28 December 1972, twin sisters). Alan lived at Mount Alvernia, in Guildford.

Louise has four children: Francis Chapman (actor and producer) Christa, Charlotte and Caspar Chapman( Vienna Boys Choir 2017 to 2025, St Peter’s College, Oxford 2026-2029 )

== See also ==
- Roy Chadwick and Stuart Davies, responsible for the Avro Lancaster (an updated Avro Manchester)
- Claude Lipscomb, designer of the Short Stirling

== Notes ==
Business positions
Preceded by	Chief Designer of Handley Page; 1923–1945	Succeeded by Reginald Stafford
