= Gouge flap =

Type of aircraft flap

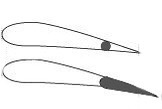
Image showing that the Gouge flap increases the wing area without creating a gap between it and the wing

The Gouge flap is a type of aircraft flap that is designed to move rearwards as well as down when extended. Invented by Arthur Gouge of Short Brothers in 1936, it allows pilots to increase both the wing area and the chord of an aircraft's wing, thereby reducing the stalling speed at a given weight. This provides benefits including a shorter take-off distance for any given load; a shorter distance to achieve a specific height; and a lower take-off speed. It is similar to a Fowler flap, however the leading edge of the Gouge flap moves to remain close to the wing, whereas extension of the Fowler flap creates a gap between the leading edge of the flap and the wing.

The Fowler flap has been widely adopted since its first use on an aircraft in the 1930s, while the Gouge flap system has only been used on aircraft produced by Short Brothers, such as the Short Sunderland flying boat and the Short Stirling bomber.

== Development ==
The Gouge flap was patented in 1936, British Patent no. 443,516 being awarded jointly to Short Bros. Ltd. and Arthur Gouge for "Improvements in or connected with Wings for Aircraft, (controller flaps)".

The Gouge flap "consists of a sharp nosed aerofoil, which in the closed position, forms part of the wing profile. The flap tapers with the wing, i.e. the width of the flap at any point is a constant proportion of the wing chord at that point; when open the extended portion also varies with the chord. All sections through the flapped portion of the wing are similar in shape and proportion. The flap moves on tracks, rotating conically about an imaginary axis below the wing, nearly parallel to the trailing edge. When open, the flap increases the wing chord and the wing area."

The British Aeronautical Research Committee's research paper R&M No. 1753 concluded, among other things, that Gouge flaps at the half and fully open positions, decreased take-off distance by 14% and 23% respectively; and decreased the distance from the starting point of a takeoff to clearing a "50 ft [15 m] obstacle" by 21% and 23% respectively. Speed at take-off was "reduced by 3 and 8 m.p.h. [5 and 13 km/h], respectively."

== History ==
Short Brothers first installed the Gouge flap on a Scion fitted with scaled-down versions of the wings being prepared for the Short Empire flying-boat. The flaps on this aircraft, which was designated 'M.3', were submitted to extensive testing by the Royal Aircraft Establishment Farnborough, their report appearing as R&M No. 1753 (see Bibliography below). Short used the Gouge flaps on several successful aircraft types, e.g. the Empire boats, the Short S.26 G-class 'Golden Boats', the Short Sunderland and the Stirling.

When the aviation periodical Flight described the Fowler flap in 1942, the article's subtitle read "An American High-lift Device With Properties Similar to Those of the Better-known British Types", and the Gouge, Handley Page, and Fairey/Youngman flaps were all given equal mention. The Gouge flap, although widely used on Shorts aircraft, was not adopted by other manufacturers, several of which developed their own variants. The Aeronautical Research Council's 1947 paper R&M No. 2622, entitled "The Aerodynamic Characteristics of Flaps", compared many variants but merely mentions the Gouge flap in a footnote on p. 10, where it is described as being "rather like the Blackburn flap ... but with no slot between the flap and wing."

The advantage of the extra value of the maximum lift coefficient provided by a slot acted in the Fowler flap's success relative to the Gouge flap, as did its natural tendency to retract itself in flight.

Short Brothers did not use the Gouge flap on their next project after the Stirling, the Shetland, preferring the use of slotted flaps on this large seaplane.

== See also ==
- Aerodynamics
- Airfoil
- Lift (force)
- High-lift device
