= Claude Lipscomb =

British engineer and aircraft designer

Claude Percival Thomas Lipscomb (1887– 11 April 1974) FRAeS was a British engineer and aircraft designer, who designed the RAF Bomber Command's first four-engined heavy bomber, the Short Stirling (S.29).

== Early life ==
C.P.T. Lipscomb was born on Portsea Island.

He attended Woolwich Polytechnic, whilst completing an apprenticeship.

== Career ==
=== Shorts ===
He joined Short Brothers in 1914 in Kent, then he later designed airships at Bedford from 1916 to 1921.

He set up the airship sheds at RAF Cardington.

By the late 1930s he was assistant chief designer. He became chief designer in 1943.

He was the chief designer until 31 December 1948, when became technical director, until 1 August 1951.

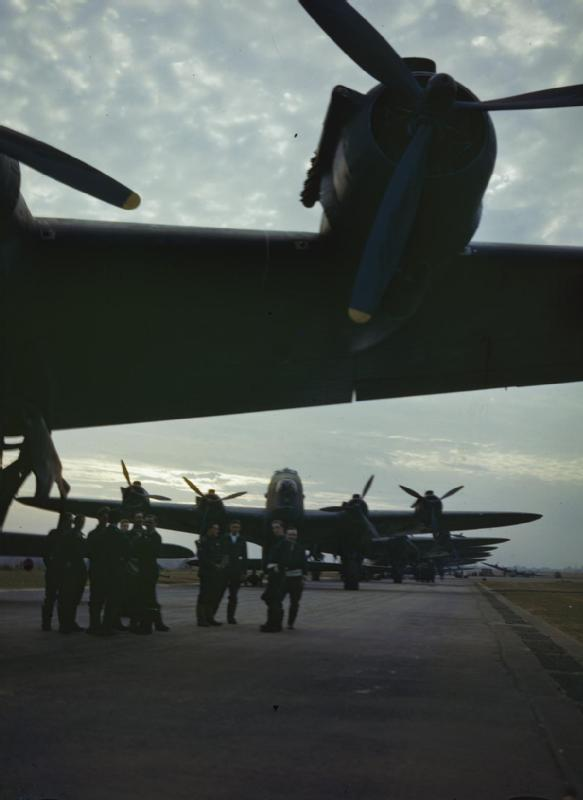
Short Stirlings of 90 Sqn await takeoff on 31 May 1943 at RAF Wratting Common in Cambridgeshire

=== Short Stirling ===
The Short Stirling, which he designed with Arthur Gouge, first flew, as L7600, on 14 May 1939 at RAF Rochester in Kent with John Lankester Parker, the Short Chief Test Pilot. The aircraft suffered a brake seizure on landing and the undercarriage collapsed.

The aircraft was designed in response to the Air Ministry Directive B.12/36, issued on 9 July 1936. It had Bristol Hercules I radial engines. The second prototype, L7605, flew on 3 December 1939. Production of the Stirling also took place in Belfast from June 1940.

The first production Stirling N3635 flew on 7 May 1940, with Hercules II engines. The Stirling Mk 1 entered service in August 1940 with 7 Squadron, with 756 being made. 1,047 were made of the Stirling Mk III, which entered service in 1942. 2383 Stirlings were made. The Stirling's first operation raid was on 10 February 1941 from RAF Oakington, and its first raid to Germany was on 17 March 1941.

He later designed a possible transatlantic four-engine airliner, the Short 14/38.

== Personal life ==
He lived in Gillingham, Kent. He married Nora Guest. He had one son, Dennis, with a grand-daughter Claire born in November 1950.

He moved to Northern Ireland and lived at 28 Shandon Park East in Bangor, County Down. He died in April 1974 in Northern Ireland aged 86. The funeral was at St Comgalls church on Saturday 13 April 1974.

His wife died on 4 May 1978, aged 90.

== See also ==
- Stuart Davies (engineer), co-designer of the Avro Lancaster, which first flew on 9 January 1941
- Sir Arthur Gouge, designer of the Short Sunderland, important in the Battle of the Atlantic
- George Volkert, designer of the Handley Page Halifax

Business positions
Preceded by Arthur Gouge	Chief Designer of Short Brothers; 1943 – December 1948	Succeeded by David Keith-Lucas
