= Arthur Gouge =

Aircraft engineer

Sir Arthur Gouge
- Born: 3 July 1890; Northfleet, Kent, England
- Died: 14 October 1962 (aged 72); Ryde, Isle of Wight, England
- Education: Woolwich Polytechnic
- Children: 2
- Engineering career
- Discipline: Aeronautical engineer
- Employer(s): Short Brothers, Saunders-Roe
- Projects: Short Empire, Short Sunderland, Short Stirling, Saunders-Roe Princess
- Significant design: Gouge flap
- Awards: RAeS British Gold Medal for Aeronautics (1937)

Sir Arthur Gouge (3 July 1890 – 14 October 1962) was a British engineer and aircraft designer from Kent, who worked notably for Short Brothers where he designed the "C-class" Empire and Sunderland flying boats.

== Early life ==
Gouge was born in Northfleet, Kent. His father George (who was born about 1862 in Sittingbourne, Kent) was a Methodist preacher.

He attended Gravesend Technical School (now Gravesend Grammar School) then Woolwich Polytechnic.

== Career ==
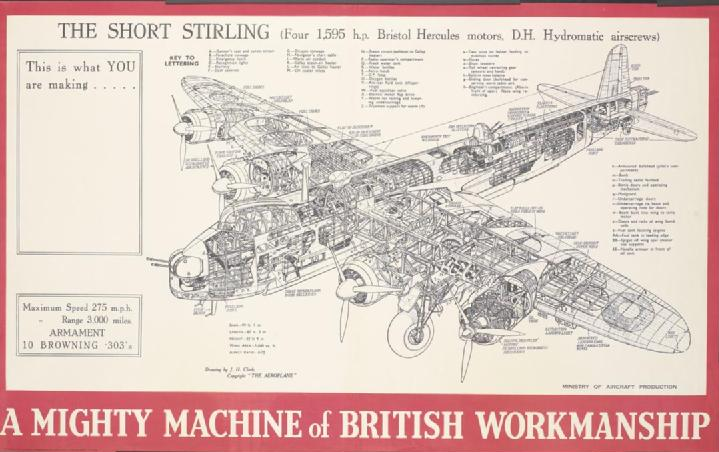
A Mighty Machine of British Workmanship poster at the IWM

As Gouge did not like school he left at the age of 13 and took up a carpentry apprenticeship with a firm of builders. Once working he developed a desire for learning and began studying engineering and mathematics at night school. This was eventually to lead to him obtaining a B.Sc. degree.

=== Shorts ===
Gouge joined Short brothers in Kent in 1915 as an ordinary hand in their carpentry section. Charles Richard Fairey, of Fairey Aviation Company, had also worked around this time at Shorts.

By the early 1920s Gouge had been noticed and he had been promoted to the test department which tested hull forms in a water tank at Rochester. The Rochester testing tank was commissioned in the last half of 1924, is believed to be the first such tank built exclusively for use in the design of flying boat hulls. Gouge and Oscar Gnosspelius, another member of the test department, designed a travelling carriage which straddled the tank and pushed the hull under test through the water. The test hulls were normally made from solid mahogany, with a highly polished finish. In the early days of the department these were often made by Gouge.

After testing the hull design for the Short Singapore I (which was based on the fluted planing bottom of the S2 flying boat) Gouge and another engineer, Jack Lower, raised questions about the proposed hull design. To lead to Oswald Short asking Francis Webber the chief designer at Shorts to re-design the hull with an unfluted planing bottom. Webber took exception to this instruction and resigned shortly afterwards. Gouge was in 1926 appointed Chief Designer in his place and changed the hull design.

In 1932 he was appointed general manager. By 1935, when the company went public, he was one of two directors of the company, along with Oswald Short.

During his time with the company he was responsible for the design of the Singapore II, III, Calcutta, Scion, Kent, Sarafand, Mayo Composite (in collaboration with Robert H. Mayo), "C-class" Empire and Sunderland flying boats, as well as the Scylla. It was Gouge in collaboration with Cyril Lipscombe, who designed the Short Stirling, the RAF's first four-engine heavy bomber, which first flew on 14 May 1939.

=== Gouge flap ===
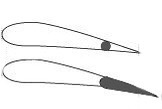
Gouge flap

Goige invented the Gouge flap in 1936 as part of his design for the Empire flying boat.

=== Saunders-Roe ===
In 1942 pressure was put on Shorts by the Ministry of Aircraft Production to improve production efficiency as well as stop production of the Stirling, and build Lancasters instead. Both Oswald Short, who was Chairman of Shorts, and Gouge, who was general manager as well as chief designer, refused. Short was forced by the government to resign on 11 January 1943 and Ministry appointed a new chairman. When the company continued to obstruct the government, it was nationalised, by Sir Stafford Cripps on 23 March 1943, using Defence Regulation 78. Gouge was subsequently dismissed.

Despite being dismissed Gouge because of his expertise and standing in the industry was able to obtain in that same year the position of chief executive and vice-chairman of Saunders-Roe. He collaborated with Henry Knowler, the chief designer of Saunders Roe on the design proposal that lead to the Ministry of Supply issuing the company with a contract to build three long range SR.45 flying boats. the aircraft was eventually named the Princess.

In September 1953 he gave a talk to the 1941 Committee, and again in July 1954.

On 18 August 1959 he resigned from Saunders-Roe when it merged with Westland Aircraft.

== Honours ==
Gouge was awarded the RAeS British Gold Medal for Aeronautics in 1937.

He was knighted in the 1948 Birthday Honours.

== Personal life ==
Gouge married Margaret Ellen Cook in 1918; they had one son and one daughter. His wife died on 15 May 1940. He died on Sunday 14 October 1962, aged 72 in Ryde, Isle of Wight.

Business positions
Preceded by Francis Webber	Chief Designer of Short Brothers; 1926-1943	Succeeded by Claude Lipscomb
Professional and academic associations
Preceded by Griffith Brewer	President of the Royal Aeronautical Society; 1942-44	Succeeded by Sir Roy Fedden
Preceded by	President of the Society of British Aircraft Constructors; 1945-	Succeeded by
