= Short Stirling =

British four-engined heavy bomber of the Second World War

Stirling
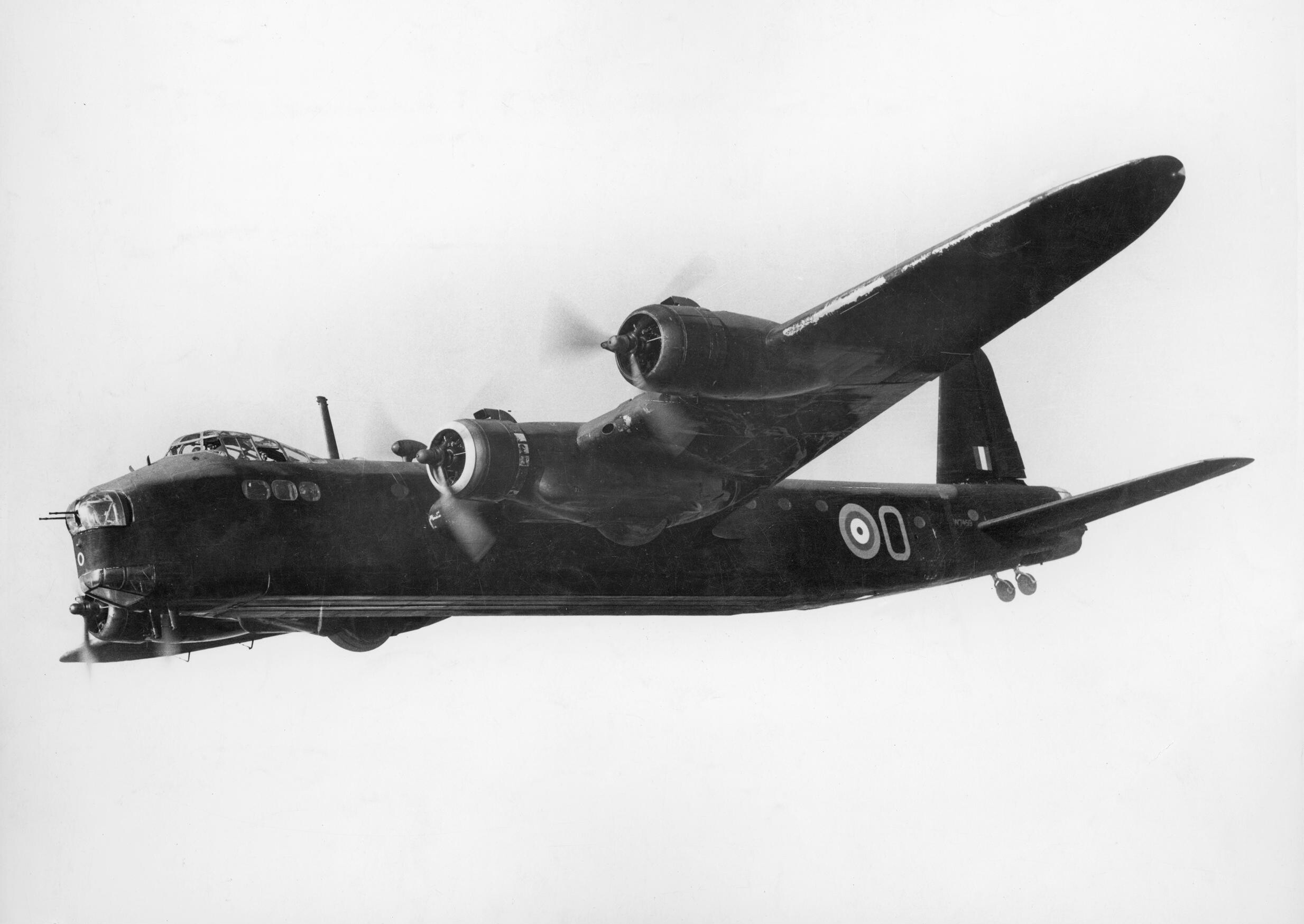
- Short Stirling Mk.I W7459 'O' of No. 1651 HCU (Heavy Conversion Unit) in flight, 1942

General information
- Type: Heavy bomber Glider tug
- National origin: United Kingdom
- Manufacturer: Short Brothers, Rochester; Short Bros. and Harland, Belfast; Austin Motor Company
- Designer: Claude Lipscomb / Sir Arthur Gouge
- Status: Retired
- Primary users: Royal Air Force Egyptian Air Force
- Number built: 2,371

History
- Manufactured: 1939–1945
- Introduction date: 1940
- First flight: 14 May 1939
- Retired: 1946 (UK); 1951 (Egypt)

The Short Stirling was a British four-engined heavy bomber of the Second World War. It has the distinction of being the first four-engined bomber to be introduced into service with the Royal Air Force (RAF) during the war (the earlier Handley Page V/1500 being a WWI design that served during the 1920s).

The Stirling was designed during the late 1930s by Short Brothers to conform with the requirements laid out in Air Ministry Specification B.12/36. Prior to this, the RAF had been primarily interested in developing increasingly capable twin-engined bombers, but had been persuaded to investigate a prospective four-engined bomber as a result of promising foreign developments in the field. Out of the submissions made to the specification, Supermarine proposed the Type 317, which was viewed as the favourite, whereas Short's submission, named the S.29, was selected as an alternative. When the preferred Type 317 had to be abandoned, the S.29, which later received the name Stirling, proceeded to production.

In early 1941, the Stirling entered squadron service. During its use as a bomber, pilots praised the type for its ability to out-turn enemy night fighters and its favourable handling characteristics, but its low ceiling was often criticised. The Stirling had a relatively brief operational career as a bomber before being relegated to second-line duties from late 1943, due to the increasing availability of the more capable Handley Page Halifax and Avro Lancaster, which took over the strategic bombing of Germany. Decisions by the Air Ministry on certain performance requirements (most significantly to restrict the wingspan of the aircraft to 100 feet [30 m]) had played a role in limiting the Stirling's performance; the 100 ft limit also affected earlier models of the Halifax (MkI and MkII) though the Lancaster never adhered to it.

During its later service, the Stirling was used for mining German ports; new and converted aircraft also flew as glider tugs and supply aircraft during the Allied invasion of Europe in 1944–1945. In the aftermath of the Second World War, the type was rapidly withdrawn from RAF service, having been replaced in the transport role by the Avro York, a derivative of the Lancaster that had previously displaced it from the bomber role. Several ex-military Stirlings were rebuilt for the civilian market.

== Development ==
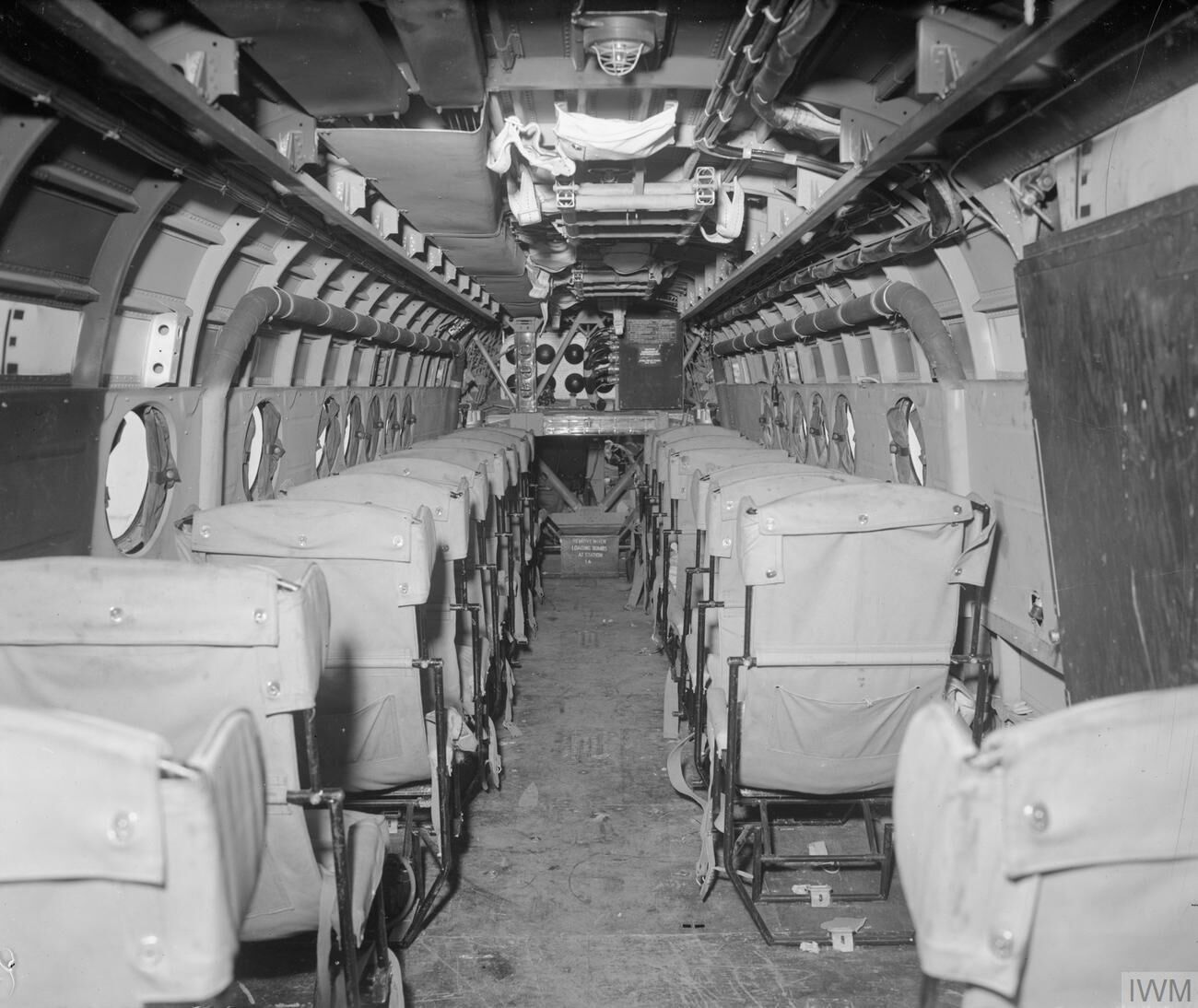
Interior of Short Stirling Mark V of Transport Command fitted with seating, 1944

=== Origins ===
In the 1930s, the Royal Air Force (RAF) was interested primarily in twin-engined bombers. These designs put limited demands on engine production and maintenance, both of which were already stretched with the introduction of so many new types into service. Power limitations were so serious that the British invested in the development of huge engines in the 2,000-horsepower (1,500 kW) class to improve performance. During the late 1930s, none of these were ready for production. The United States and the Soviet Union were pursuing the development of bombers powered by arrangements of four smaller engines; the results of these projects proved to possess favourable characteristics such as excellent range and fair lifting capacity, and in 1936, the RAF also decided to investigate the feasibility of the four-engined bomber.

The Air Ministry published Specification B.12/36, for a high-speed, long-range, four-engined strategic bomber aircraft that would be capable of being designed and constructed at speed. The bomb load was to be a maximum of 14,000 pounds (6,400 kg) carried to a range of 2,000 miles (3,200 km) or a lesser payload of 8,000 pounds (3,600 kg) to 3,000 miles (4,800 km) (very demanding for the era). It was to have a crew of six and was to have a normal all-up weight of 48,000 lb, while a maximum overload weight of 65,000 lb was also envisioned. The aircraft would have to be capable of cruising at speeds of 230 mph or greater while flying at 15,000 ft (4,600 m), carrying three gun turrets (located in the nose, amidships, and rear positions) for defence.

The aircraft should also be able to be used as a troop transport for 24 soldiers and be able to use catapult assistance for takeoff when heavily laden. The concept was that the aircraft would fly troops to far corners of the British Empire and then support them with bombing. To help with this task, as well as ease production, it needed to be able to be broken down into parts, for transport by train. Since it could be operating from limited "back country" airfields, it needed to lift off from a 500 ft (150 m) runway and be able to clear 50 ft (15 m) trees at the end, a specification with which most small aircraft would have a problem today. Aviation author Geoffrey Norris observed that the stringent requirements given in the specification for the prospective aircraft to be able to make use of existing infrastructure, specifically the specified maximum wingspan of 100 feet, adversely affected the Stirling's performance, such as its relatively low ceiling and its inability to carry anything larger than 500 lb bombs.

In mid-1936, Specification B.12/36 was sent out to Supermarine, Boulton Paul, Handley Page, and Armstrong Whitworth. In August, the specification was issued to the rest of British industry. Left out of those asked to tender designs, Shorts were later included because the company already had similar designs in hand while possessing ample design staff and production facilities to fulfil production commitments. Shorts were producing several four-engined flying boat designs of the required size and created their S.29 proposal by removing the lower deck and boat hull of the S.25 Sunderland. The new S.29 design was similar to the Sunderland; the wings and controls were the same, construction was identical, and it even retained the slight upward bend at the rear of the fuselage, which had originally been intended to keep the Sunderland's tail clear of sea spray. As originally designed, the S.29 was considered to be capable of favourable high-altitude performance.

Following a Tender Design Conference in October 1936, the S.29 was low down on the short list of designs considered. Vickers Type 293 submission was first followed by the Boulton Paul P.90, Armstrong Whitworth's AW.42, the Supermarine Type 316, and then the Short S.29. The Supermarine was ordered in prototype (two aircraft) form as the revised Supermarine Type 317 (Note: The Type 317 had increased wing area over the Type 316 and twin fins. Supermarine were told not to proceed further with their Merlin-engined alternative, the Type 318, to concentrate on the Type 317) in January 1937. An alternative design to the Supermarine was needed for insurance, and Shorts should build it, as they had experience with four-engined aircraft. The original design had been criticised when considered, and in February 1937, the Air Ministry suggested modifications to the design, including considering the use of the Bristol Hercules radial engine as an alternative to the Napier Dagger inline, increasing service ceiling to 28,000 ft (carrying a 2000 lb of bombs) and reducing the wingspan. Shorts accepted this large amount of redesign work. The project had added importance due to the death of Supermarine's designer, Reginald Mitchell, which had generated doubt within the Air Ministry about the ability of Supermarine to deliver. Two prototypes were ordered from Shorts.

The S.29 used the Sunderland's 114 ft (35 m) wing and it had to be reduced to less than 100 ft (30 m) (Note: The contemporary P.13/36 specification that led to the Handley Page Halifax and Avro Manchester was for twin-engined aircraft that were expected to be same weight as the B.1/35 bomber specification, which was also limited to 100 ft wingspan, but "a good deal smaller and faster".) To get the needed lift from a shorter span and excess weight, the redesigned wing was thickened and reshaped. The wingspan was often said to be limited to 100 ft so the aircraft would fit into existing hangars, but the maximum hangar opening was 112 ft (34 m) and the specification required outdoor servicing. The wingspan limit was a method of stopping aircraft from being too large. In June 1937, the S.29 was accepted as the second string for the Supermarine Type 317 and formally ordered in October; Shorts and Supermarine were issued with instructions to proceed.

=== Prototypes ===
The Air Ministry issued Shorts with contract number 672299/37, under which a pair of prototype S.29s was ordered. However, prior to this, Shorts had decided to undertake a successful practice, which had been performed with the earlier Empire flying boat, in producing a half-scale version of the aircraft, known as the S.31 (also known internally as the M4 – as per the title on the tailfin), to prove the aerodynamic characteristics of the design. The S.31, which was largely composed of wood, was powered by an arrangement of four Pobjoy Niagara engines and featured a retractable undercarriage, operable bomb-bay doors, and other measures to realistically represent the larger production aircraft. It was constructed at Short's Rochester facility.

The Short S.31 half-scale testbed used for aerodynamic tests of the Stirling design

On 19 September 1938, the S.31 conducted its maiden flight, piloted by Shorts' Chief Test Pilot J. Lankester Parker. Impressed with its performance, on 21 October 1938, Parker flew the S.31 to RAF Martlesham Heath, Suffolk, where it was evaluated by the Aeroplane and Armament Experimental Establishment and received mostly favourable reviews. There was one notable criticism amongst the feedback from pilots, being that the length of the takeoff run was considered to be excessive and that improvements would be desirable. Fixing this required that the angle of the wing to be increased for takeoff; however, if the wing itself were modified, the aircraft would fly with a nose-down attitude while cruising (as in the Armstrong Whitworth Whitley); making this change was also complicated by the fact that work on the production line had already reached an advanced stage. Thus, Shorts lengthened the undercarriage struts to tilt the nose up on take-off, leading to its spindly gear, which, in turn, contributed to many takeoff and landing accidents.

The S.31 also received the lengthened undercarriage to test this; subsequent trials found no need for further modification in this respect. Other modifications made included the adoption of a larger tailplane with conventional elevators to improve aft controllability. The sole S.31 was scrapped after a takeoff accident at RAF Stradishall, Suffolk, in February 1944. Meanwhile, before either of the prototypes had flown, the Air Ministry had decided to order the S.29 into production "off the drawing board" in response to reports of further increases in strength on the part of the German Luftwaffe.

On 14 May 1939, the first S.29, which had by this point received the service name "Stirling" after the Scottish city, performed its first flight, but on landing, one of the brakes locked, causing the aircraft to slew off the runway and the landing gear to collapse. The resulting damage caused the first prototype to be written off. A resulting redesign of the undercarriage led to substantially stronger and heavier struts being installed upon the second prototype. On 3 December 1939, the second prototype made its maiden flight.

=== Production ===
Prior to the Munich Agreement of 1938, Shorts had received a pair of orders for the Stirling, each for the production of 100 aircraft; however, as a result of Munich, the Ministry of Aircraft Production (MAP) enacted 'Plan L', under which Stirling orders were rapidly increased to 1,500 aircraft. In addition to contracts extending the projected work at Rochester and Belfast; some of the additional contracts were placed with Austin Motors to be produced at their Longbridge facility and with Rootes, which were to manufacture the type at their new shadow factory in Stoke-on-Trent. At its height, manufacturing activity on the Stirling was being performed at a total of 20 factories. According to Norris, while the aircraft's design had incorporated an inherent ability for production of the Stirling to be broken down, in practice, strict supervision of the work remained necessary. To coordinate the dispersed production approach adopted for the Stirling, Shorts and MAP operated a travelling team of 600 production engineers and draughtsmen who routinely travelled throughout the United Kingdom to the manufacturing facilities involved.

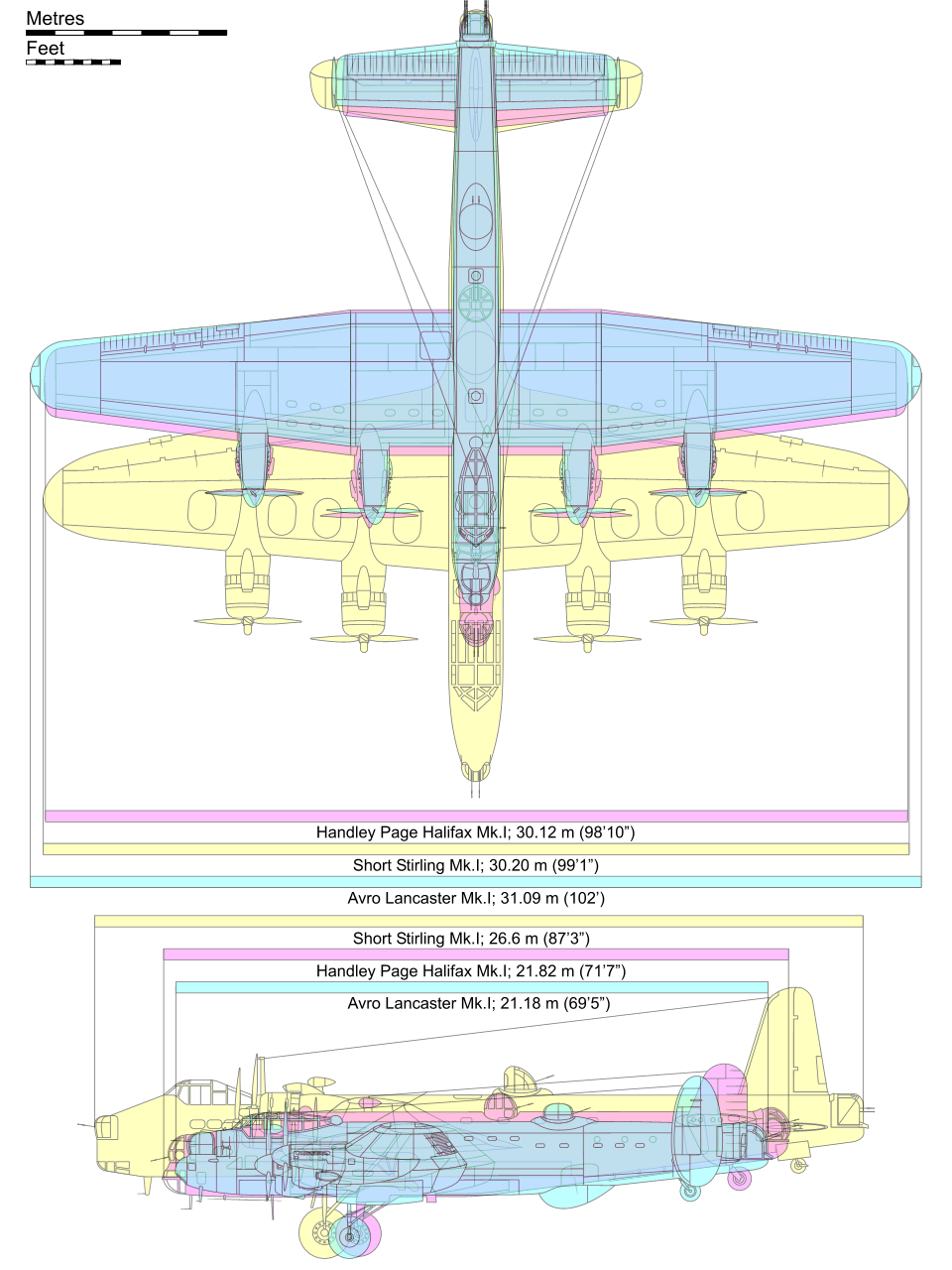
Diagram comparing the Stirling (yellow) with its contemporaries - the Avro Lancaster (blue) and the Handley Page Halifax (pink)

On 7 May 1940, the first production Stirling conducted its first flight. According to Norris, initial rates of production were disappointing, and were in part due to delays in the delivery of machine tools and forgings. It has also been alleged that production of the Stirling was negatively impacted by a decision by Lord Beaverbrook, the MAP, which had ordered a change in priority from four-engined bombers towards fighters and twin-engined aircraft to replace those lost during the Battle of Britain. In August 1940, series production of the Stirling commenced at the Rochester factory.

Production of the Stirling was delayed by the ongoing bombing campaign of the Luftwaffe. The area, which included a number of major aviation firms, was heavily bombed in the opening days of the Battle of Britain, including one famous low-level raid by a group of Dornier Do 17s. A number of completed Stirlings were destroyed on the ground and the factories were heavily damaged, setting back production by almost a year. Some production was moved to Austin's Longbridge factory at Cofton Hackett just south of Birmingham, the Longbridge production line eventually produced nearly 150 Stirlings.

From this point on, the Belfast factory became increasingly important, as it was thought to be well beyond the range of German bombers. However, Belfast and the aircraft factory were subjected to bombing by German aircraft during the Easter week of 1941. To meet the increased requirement for its aircraft during the war, satellite factories near Belfast were operated at Aldergrove and Maghaberry, producing 232 Stirlings between them. In 1940, bombing damaged Supermarine's factory at Woolston and the incomplete Type 316 prototypes. In November 1940, development of the 316 was formally cancelled, leaving the Stirling as the only B.12/36 design.

The first few Stirling Mk.Is were furnished with Bristol Hercules II engines, but most were built with more powerful 1,500 hp (1,100 kW) Hercules XI engines, instead.

Total production of the bomber variants was 1759 aircraft, divided among four locations, as follows:

- Short Brothers plant, Belfast: 261 Mk.I and 342 Mk.III
- Short Brothers plant, Rochester, later relocated to the shadow factory of South Marston: 260 Mk.I and 276 Mk.III
- Austin Motors plant, Longbridge: 181 Mk.I and 429 Mk.III

Another 610 aircraft were built directly as Mk.IV and Mk.V transports/glider tugs.

=== Proposed developments ===
Even before the Stirling went into production, Short had improved on the initial design with the S.34 in an effort to meet specification B.1/39. It would have been powered by four Bristol Hercules 17 SM engines, optimised for high-altitude flight. The new design featured longer-span wings and a revised fuselage able to carry dorsal and ventral power-operated turrets each fitted with four 20 mm Hispano cannons; despite the obvious gains in performance and capability, the Air Ministry was not interested.

In 1941, it was decided that the Stirling would be manufactured in Canada and an initial contract for 140 aircraft was placed. Called the Stirling Mk.II, the Hercules engines were to be replaced by 1,600 hp (1,200 kW) Wright GR-2600-A5B Twin Cyclone engines; a pair of prototypes was converted from Mk.I aircraft. The contract was cancelled in favour of manufacturing other aircraft; thus, no production Mk.IIs was completed.

Shorts pursued the development of the Stirling for potential use on the civilian market. The S.37 was a fully-furnished transport aircraft that was capable of seating 30 passengers and was constructed to conform with civilian standards. A prototype, known as the Silver Stirling, was converted from a Mk.V aircraft; partly due to greater levels of interest being expressed for a more promising civilian version of the Handley-Page Halifax, the proposal met with little official interest.

In 1941, Short proposed the development of a new variant of the Stirling, the S.36, which was nicknamed the "Super Stirling" in a company publication. (Note: Not to be confused with a prototype light aircraft that was built in 1912, which was also known as the Short S.36.) This aircraft would have featured a wing span of 135 ft 9 in (41.38 m), four Bristol Centaurus radials and a maximum takeoff weight of 104,000 lb (47,000 kg). The projected performance estimates included a speed of 300 mph (480 km/h) and a 4,000 mi (6,400 km) range, along with a weapons load of 10,000 lb (4,500 kg) over 2,300 mi (3,700 km), or 23,500 lb (10,700 kg) over 1,000 mi (1,600 km). The defensive armament of the S.36 was to be an assortment of 10 .50 BMG machine guns that were set into three turrets.

The S.36 was initially accepted for testing under Specification B.8/41, which had been written to cover the type, and an order for a pair of prototypes was placed. Arthur Harris, commander of Bomber Command, felt that achieving bulk production of the type would take too much time and that the effort would be better expended on outfitting the existing design with improved Hercules engines with the aim of providing a higher operational ceiling. While the Air Staff initially found the proposal to have some attraction, it was eventually decided to favour increased production of the rival Avro Lancaster, instead. In May 1942, Shorts were informed that the Air Ministry would not be continuing the project; in August 1942, Shorts decided to terminate all work.

== Design ==
=== Overview ===
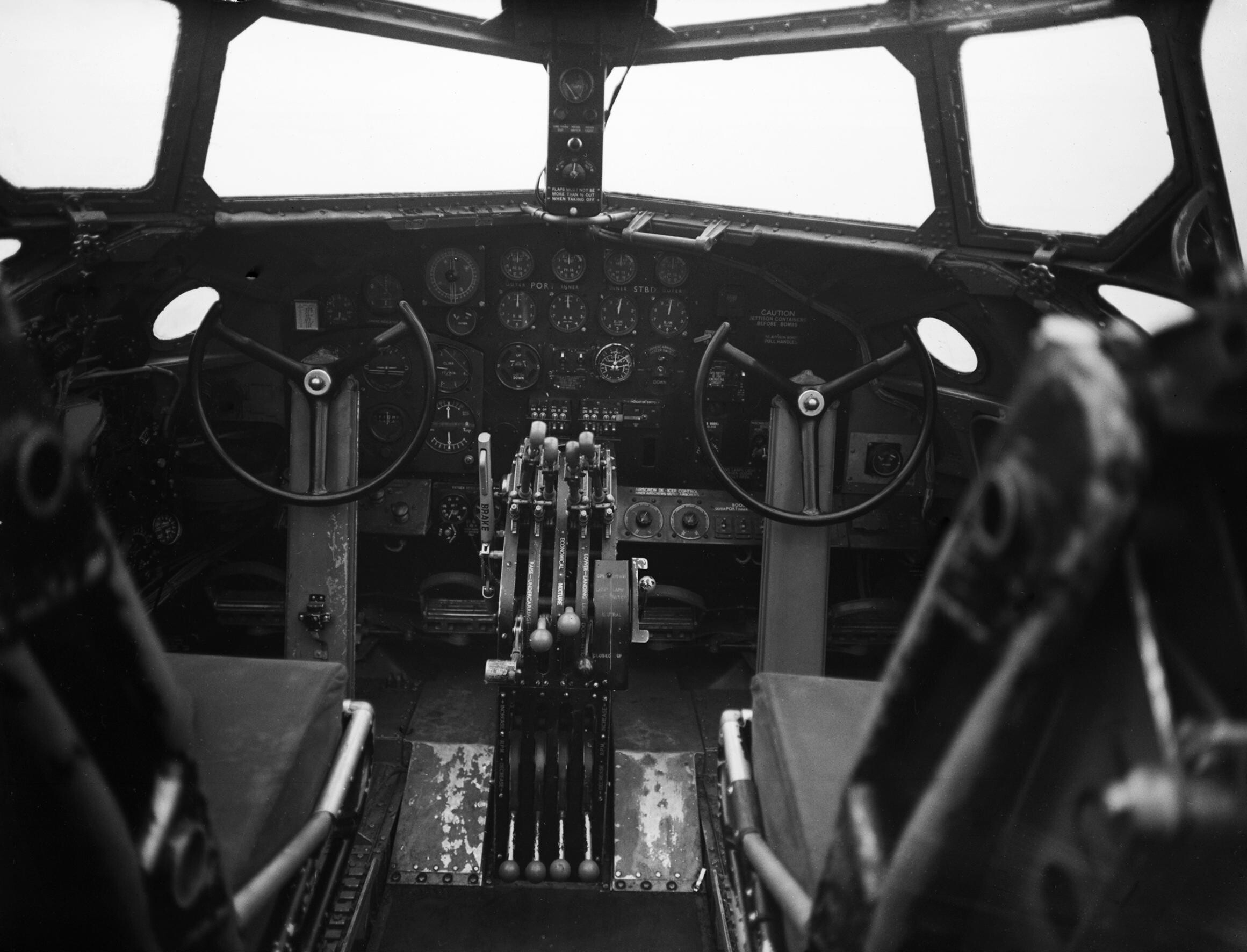
Instrument panel and controls of Stirling Mk I

The Short Stirling was a four-engined monoplane heavy bomber designed to provide a previously unmatched level of strategic bombing capability to the Royal Air Force (RAF). It was powered by four Bristol Hercules radial engines which were spaced across its mid-mounted wing. The Stirling has the distinction of being the only British bomber of the period to see service that had been designed from the start with four engines - the Avro Lancaster was a re-engined, stretched-wingspan Avro Manchester while the Halifax was planned to be powered by twin Rolls-Royce Vulture engines but was similarly re-designed to use an arrangement of four Merlin engines in 1937. (Note: The Vulture engine which had been preferred for the large twin-engine bombers such as the Avro Manchester and the initial Handley Page Halifax design did not receive as much development due to focus on the Merlin and in service showed to have poor reliability.)

Although smaller than both of the pre-war American "XBLR"-designation designs (the 149-foot wingspan, 35-ton Boeing XB-15 and the 212-foot wingspan, 79-ton Douglas XB-19) and nearly as large as contemporary Soviet experimental heavy bomber designs, the Stirling had considerably more power and far better payload/range than anything then flying from any British-based aviation firm. The massive 14,000 lb (6.25 long tons, 6,340 kg) bomb load put it in a class of its own, double that of any other bomber. It was longer and taller than its replacements the Handley Page Halifax and the Avro Lancaster but they were both originally designed to have twin engines.

=== Crew accommodation ===
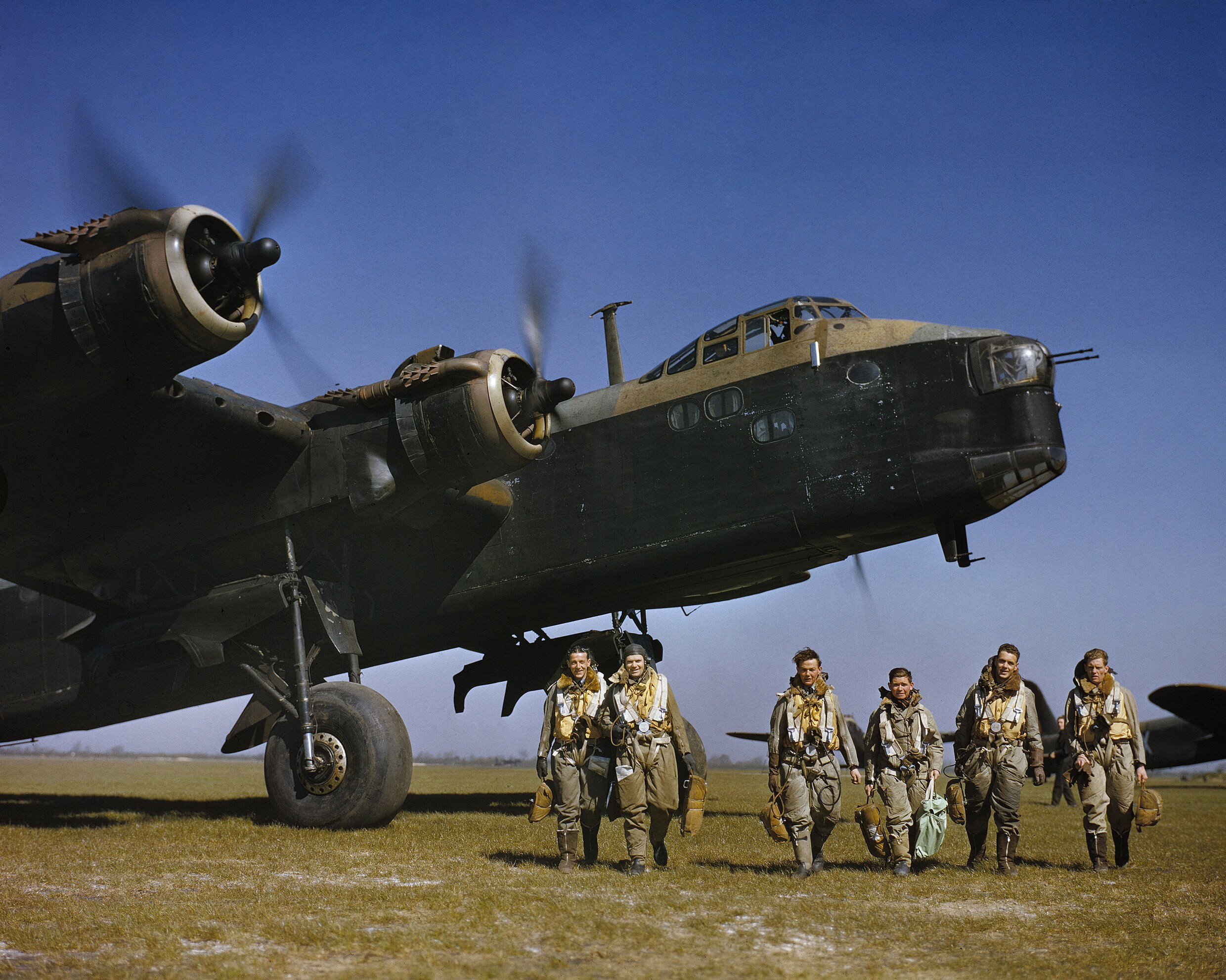
Aircrew in front of Short Stirling Mark I, N3676 of No. 1651 Heavy Conversion Unit at RAF Waterbeach in 1942

Under typical operations, most variants of the Stirling were flown with a crew of seven, performing several different roles. It was flown by a pair of pilots, who were supported by a navigator/bomb aimer, a front gunner/Wireless operator, two further gunners, and a flight engineer. The flight engineer and wireless operator were housed in a cabin just forward of the leading edge of the wing, and directly forward of them was the navigator's station. The two pilots were contained within a fully glazed flight deck positioned level with the forward end of the bomb cells; the provision of a separate flight engineer's station led to the cockpit having a relatively simple appearance in comparison with the majority of the RAF's bombers.

The cockpit containing the flying officers was provided with numerous controls and features; to the left of the first pilot were the controls for the auto-pilot and a P.4 compass; the pilot was also provided with a beam approach indicator (to aid nighttime landings) and DF visual loop indicator in addition to the standard flight controls. Switches for the flaps and position indicators were located on a central panel set between the two pilots, while the master fuel cocks were set above these on the roof; throttle and mixture controls were also normally positioned between the pilots. Only limited engine instrumentation was provisioned for, such as engine speed indicators and boost gauges.

The navigator/bomb-aimer would perform the latter of these roles in a prone position within the aircraft's nose. For bomb-aiming, a drift sight, camera, and steering control over the auto-pilot were provided; directly above this position was the front turret position of the bomber. Just aft of the wireless operator's position, the centre section of the wing cut across the fuselage; the space above this was used for storing oxygen tanks while the space below was used as a rest bunk. Behind the rest area, the uninterrupted deck ran across the full length of the bomb cells to the location in which the retractable ventral turret was installed upon early production aircraft; the internal area aft of this position was used to store flame floats and reconnaissance flares, as well as an escape hatch, lavatory, rear turret position, and the crew entry door on the port side.

The Stirling was armed with a two-gun FN.5 nose turret and a four-gun FN.20A tail turret (the latter was notable for the wide angles of fire) along with a single retractable two-guns FN.25 ventral ("dustbin") turret located just behind the bomb-bay. This proved almost useless due to cramped conditions, with the added distraction that the turret tended to drop and hit the ground when taxiing over bumps. The retractable turret was removed almost from the start and temporarily replaced by beam hatches mounting pairs of machine guns, until a twin-gun dorsal turret could be provided. This turret designated the FN.7A also had problems; it had a metal back fitted with an escape hatch which turned out to be almost impossible to use.

The Stirling Mk.III, introduced in 1943, was similar to the Mk.I with the exception of the improved 1,635 hp (1,219 kW) Hercules VI or XVI engines, which improved maximum speed from 255 to 270 mph (410 to 435 km/h). The Mk.III used a fully glazed dorsal turret (the same FN.50 as in Lancaster) that had more room and an improved view. Early Mk.III Stirlings were fitted with a 12.7 mm Browning machine gun in the rear escape hatch (behind a perspex shield) to ward off German night fighters using the Schräge Musik system. Later Stirlings were fitted with an improved, low-drag remotely-controlled FN.64 ventral turret or a H2S radar. Mk.III Stirlings also were fitted with electronic countermeasure systems such as ventral antennas for the Mandrel jamming system as well as a ventral "window" chaff chute to jam Freya and Würzburg radars. Mk.III Stirlings were also fitted with a ventral antenna for the Blind Approach Beacon System which was a blind-landing aid and a Monica rear warning radar in the tail turret.

=== Structure ===
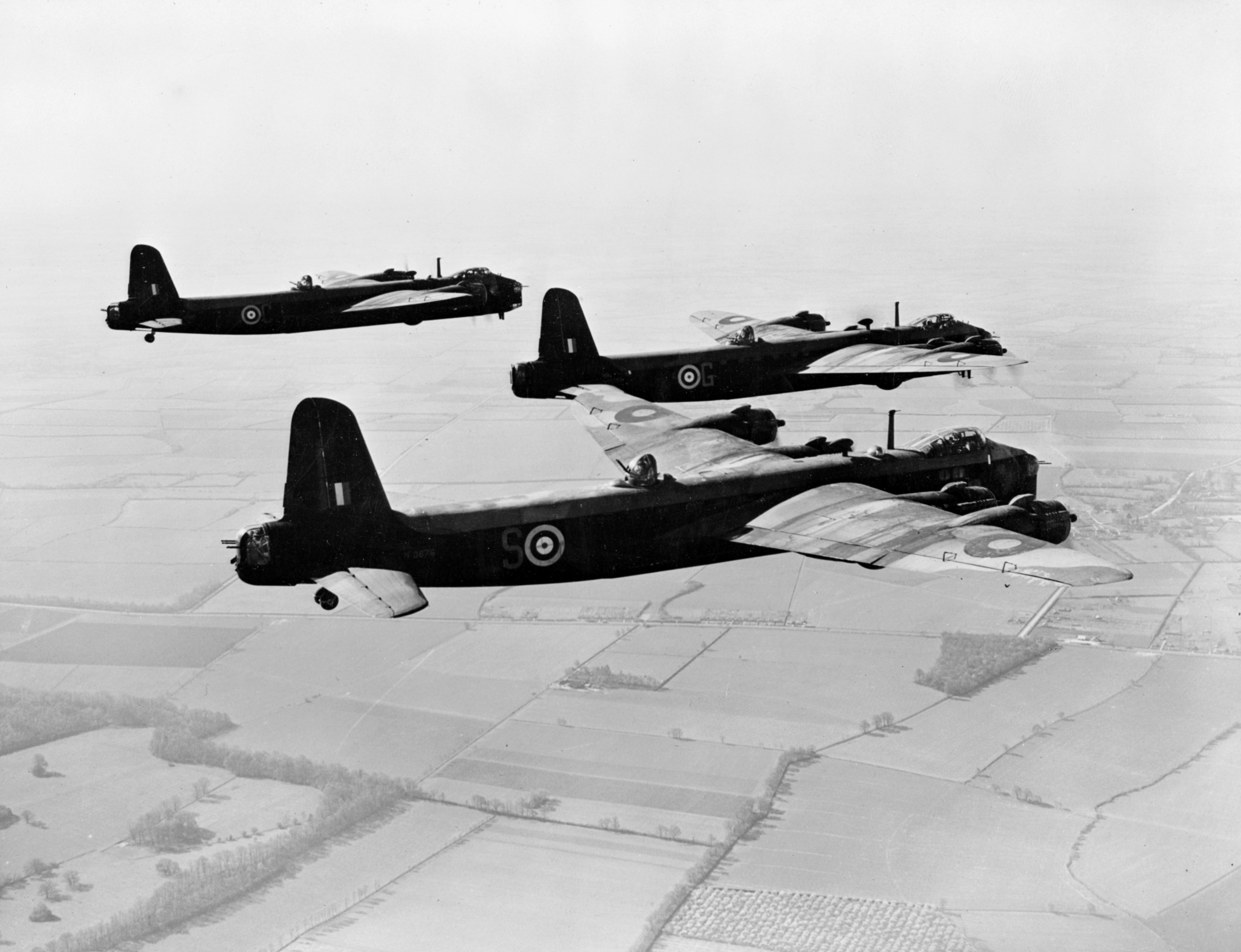
Flight of No. 1651 Heavy Conversion Unit Short Stirling aircraft

The construction of the Stirling shares considerable similarity to the earlier Short Empire flying boats. The cantilever mid-mounted wing, which employed a two-spar structure covered by aluminium alloy sheeting that was flush-rivetted to the internal spars and ribs, was one instance of design similarity. The wing housed three large self-sealing fuel tanks within the spar truss, along with a fourth non-self-sealing fuel tank within the leading edge of the wing root, which provided for a combined tankage of 2,254 gallons. Up to six ferry tanks could also be installed within the wing bomb cells to add another 220 gallons. Significant attention was paid to reducing drag – all rivets were flush headed and panels joggled to avoid edges – but camouflage paint probably negated the benefit. The wing was fitted with Gouge flaps similar to those of the flying boats.

The fuselage of the Stirling was distinct from Short's flying boat lineage, being constructed in four sections and employing continuous stringers throughout each section, as opposed to interruptions of the stringers at every frame as per established practice at Shorts. The four sections were joined using tension bolts through the webs of the end frames. The lower sides of the centre-section spar booms aligned with the main deck of the aircraft, which was supported upon the three longitudinal girders which formed the three parallel bomb cells. The bomb cells were sub-divided into 19-foot compartments sufficient to accommodate conventional 500 lb bombs or 2,000 lb armour-piercing bombs but nothing bigger.

Hydraulic power was used for various purposes throughout the Stirling. The nose and dorsal turrets were powered by a duplex pump driven by the inner port engine, while the dorsal turret was powered by a single pump driven by the inner starboard engine. Pulsations in the hydraulic lines were smoothed out by a series of recuperators; German fighter pilots soon learned that by shooting at the area around roundels painted on the fuselage, two of the three turrets could be disabled and the recuperators were moved in later models of the Stirling to reduce their vulnerability.

The first production model of the Stirling was powered by the Bristol Hercules II radial engine, which were housed in fully monocoque nacelles. Upon the availability of the improved Hercules XI engine, new welded steel-tube framework engine mountings were incorporated, further changes were implemented to the installation of the power units were subsequently made by Bristol. Hydraulic control of the throttle was a source of slow responsiveness and irritation and often proved dangerous during take-offs.

=== Flying characteristics ===
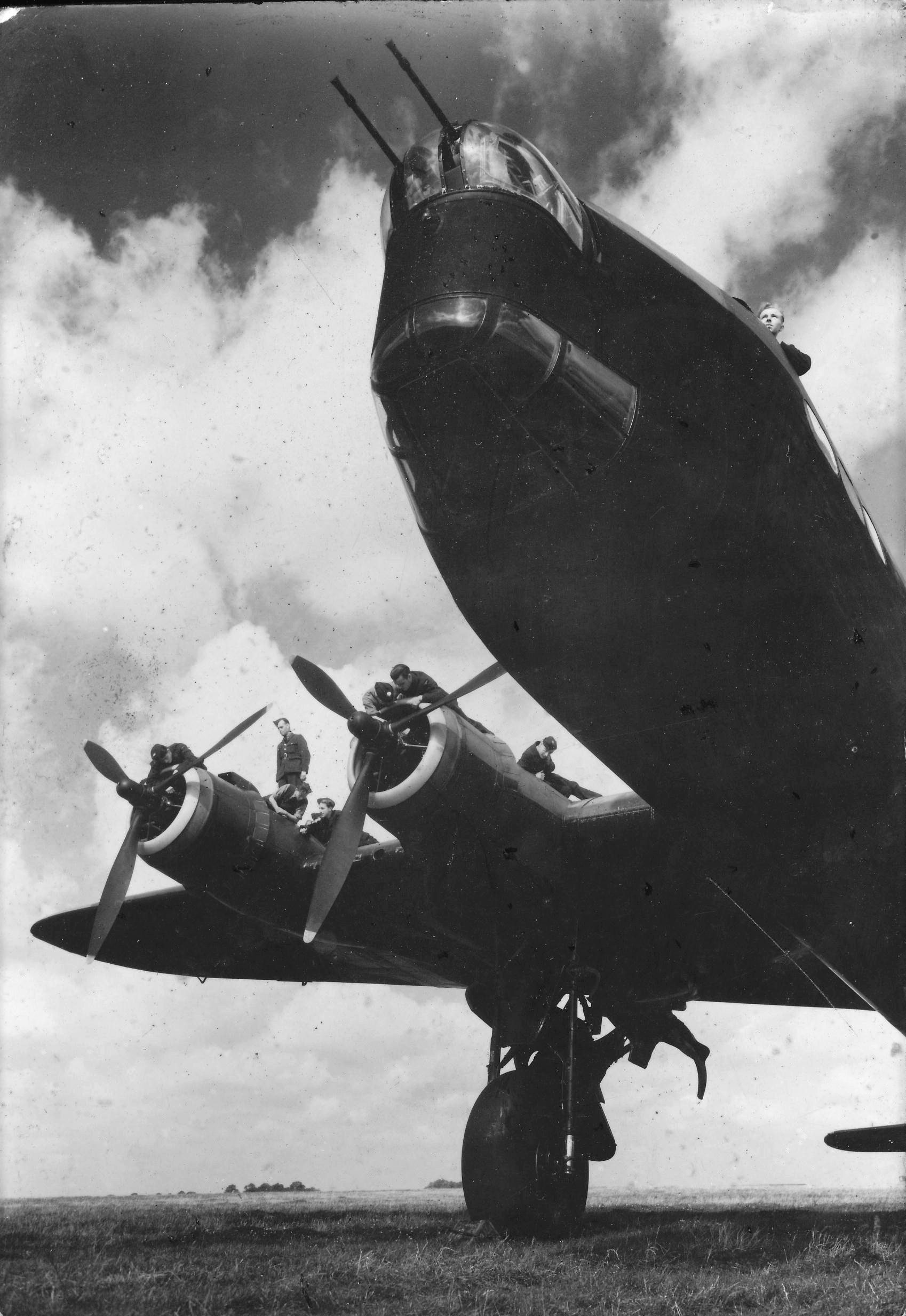
Ground crew performing maintenance

Pilot accounts generally report that, once airborne, the Short Stirling was a delight to fly, surprisingly manoeuvrable for such a large aircraft and without any vices. According to Norris, the Stirling was "more manoeuvreable and responsive than any other aircraft in its class". The shortcomings of the aircraft in terms of lower ceiling and limited range are largely forgiven in pilot autobiographies. The Stirling did, however, exhibit some vicious flying characteristics during takeoff and landings.

As a class, the large and heavy four-engined tail-wheeled bombers such as the Stirling, Handley Page Halifax, Avro Lancaster and Boeing B-17 Flying Fortress could be a handful on takeoff and landing, more so for relatively young and inexperienced new pilots who formed the vast majority of the expanding Commonwealth and American air forces. Later heavy bomber designs such as the Consolidated B-24 Liberator and Boeing B-29 Superfortress used a nose-wheel (tricycle) configuration as did most successful four engined commercial aircraft in the post-war years. Tricycle geared aircraft are typically easier to control on takeoff, landing and during taxiing, and also make for easier cargo loading and servicing as the cabin, engines and other systems are closer to the ground. The long undercarriage of the Stirling was a result of a request by the RAF who sought to increase the wing incidence. (Note: According to Geoffrey Norris, Shorts had sought to adopt a larger wingspan for the Stirling to improve its performance but were overruled and this was to the type's detriment during its service.)

The Short Stirling had particularly challenging flying characteristics on takeoff and landing, even in comparison with other tail-wheeled contemporaries. After a series of serious accidents and total aircraft losses involving uncontrolled ground loops on takeoff, the Royal Air Force implemented a special training and certification programme for all prospective Stirling pilots. Proper takeoff technique involved feeding in right engine throttle during the initial 20 seconds of the takeoff run until the rudder became effective for control. If all four throttles were advanced simultaneously, the aircraft would swing to the right, become uncontrollable and often collapse the landing gear which could be disastrous if the aircraft was loaded with bombs and fuel.

On flare-out for landing, the Short Stirling exhibited a tendency to suddenly stall and "drop like a stone" to the runway. With such a heavy aircraft, a "dropped" landing could cause serious structural damage. During its service life, it was not unknown for "dropped" landings to render Stirlings or other large four-engined bombers write-offs and suitable only for parts.

== Operational history ==
In July 1940, the first production Stirling departed Rochester; in August 1940, it was delivered to No. 7 Squadron at RAF Leeming, North Yorkshire. Following a four-month working-up period in which crews adapted to operating the type, the Stirling attained operational status in January 1941. On the night of 10/11 February 1941, the first operational combat mission was performed, flown by the first three Stirlings, against fuel storage tanks at Vlaardingen near Rotterdam, in the Netherlands, all but two bombers were deployed during the mission, which was considered to have run smoothly. By the end of 1941, more than 150 Stirlings had been completed and three RAF squadrons had been equipped with it. Stirlings flew on day and night bombing operations and had been found to be most capable of standing up to enemy interceptor aircraft by using a sweeping combination of fighters and bombers, in what was known as "Circus" operations.

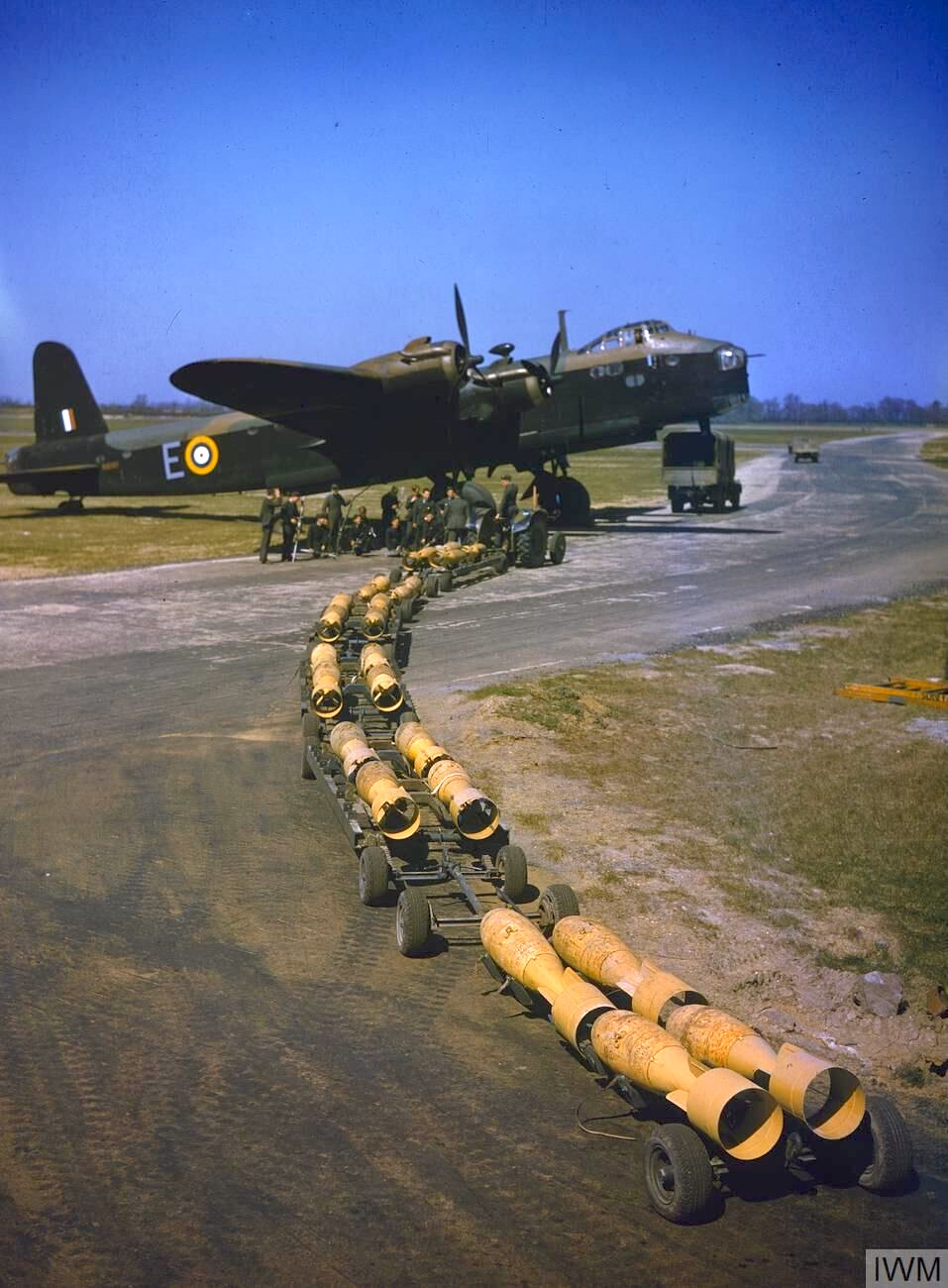
Short Stirling of No. 1651 Heavy Conversion Unit c.1941 being loaded with bombs.

From late 1941, the Stirling played a pioneering role in the formation of the RAF's Pathfinder squadrons, specialist navigation and target-finding squadrons to assist Main Force squadrons. From the spring of 1942, the number of Stirlings in service began to increase. From May 1943, raids on Germany were often conducted using over a hundred Stirling bombers at a time. Stirlings were amongst the RAF bombers used during the first 1,000 bomber raid against Cologne. Norris observed that, by 1942, the type had "given plenty of punishment to the Germans and was also proving that it could itself take punishment to an incredible extent". There were several incidents in which damaged aircraft, such as one Stirling which suffered a head-on collision with a Messerschmitt Bf 109 fighter over Hamburg, were able to return to base.

Despite the "disappointing performance" at maximum altitude, Stirling pilots were delighted to discover that, due to the thick wing, they could out-turn the Junkers Ju 88 and Messerschmitt Bf 110 nightfighters they faced. Its handling was much better than that of the Halifax and some preferred it to the Lancaster. Based on its flight characteristics, Flt Lt Murray Peden (RCAF) of No. 214 Squadron RAF described the Stirling as "one of the finest aircraft ever built". A consequence of the thick wing was a low ceiling; many missions were flown as low as 12,000 ft (3,700 m). This was a disadvantage if crews were attacking Italy and had to fly through (rather than "over") the Alps. When Stirlings were on operations with other RAF bombers which could fly higher, the Luftwaffe concentrated on the Stirlings. Within five months of being introduced, 67 out of 84 aircraft had been lost to enemy action or written off after crashes.

The Stirling's maximum bomb load could be carried for only around 590 miles (950 km). On typical missions deep into Germany or Italy, a smaller 3,500-pound (1,600 kg) load was carried, consisting of seven 500-pound (230 kg) GP bombs; this payload was in the range of that which was already being carried by the RAF's medium bombers, such as the Vickers Wellington and by 1944, the de Havilland Mosquito. Perhaps the biggest weakness present in the design was that, although the bomb bay was large at 40 ft (12 m) long, it had a pair of structural dividers that ran down the middle, limiting the bay to nothing larger than the 2,000-pound (910 kg) bomb. As the RAF started using the 4,000-pound (1,800 kg) "cookies" and even larger "specials", the Stirling became less useful. The Handley-Page Halifax and especially the Avro Lancaster offered better performance and when these aircraft became available in greater numbers from 1943, the Stirlings were relegated to secondary tasks. (Note: the Lancaster could carry twice the Stirling's bomb load over long distances and was at least 40 miles per hour (64 km/h) faster while having an operating altitude of about 4,000 feet (1,200 m) higher.)

During the type's service with Bomber Command, Stirlings flew a total of 18,440 sorties, during which 27,821 tons of bombs were dropped; 641 aircraft were lost in action while a further 128 were written off. By December 1943, Stirlings were being withdrawn from frontline service as bombers. The aircraft remained in service for minelaying operations in the vicinity of German ports ("Gardening"), electronic countermeasures, dropping spies deep behind enemy lines at night and towing gliders.

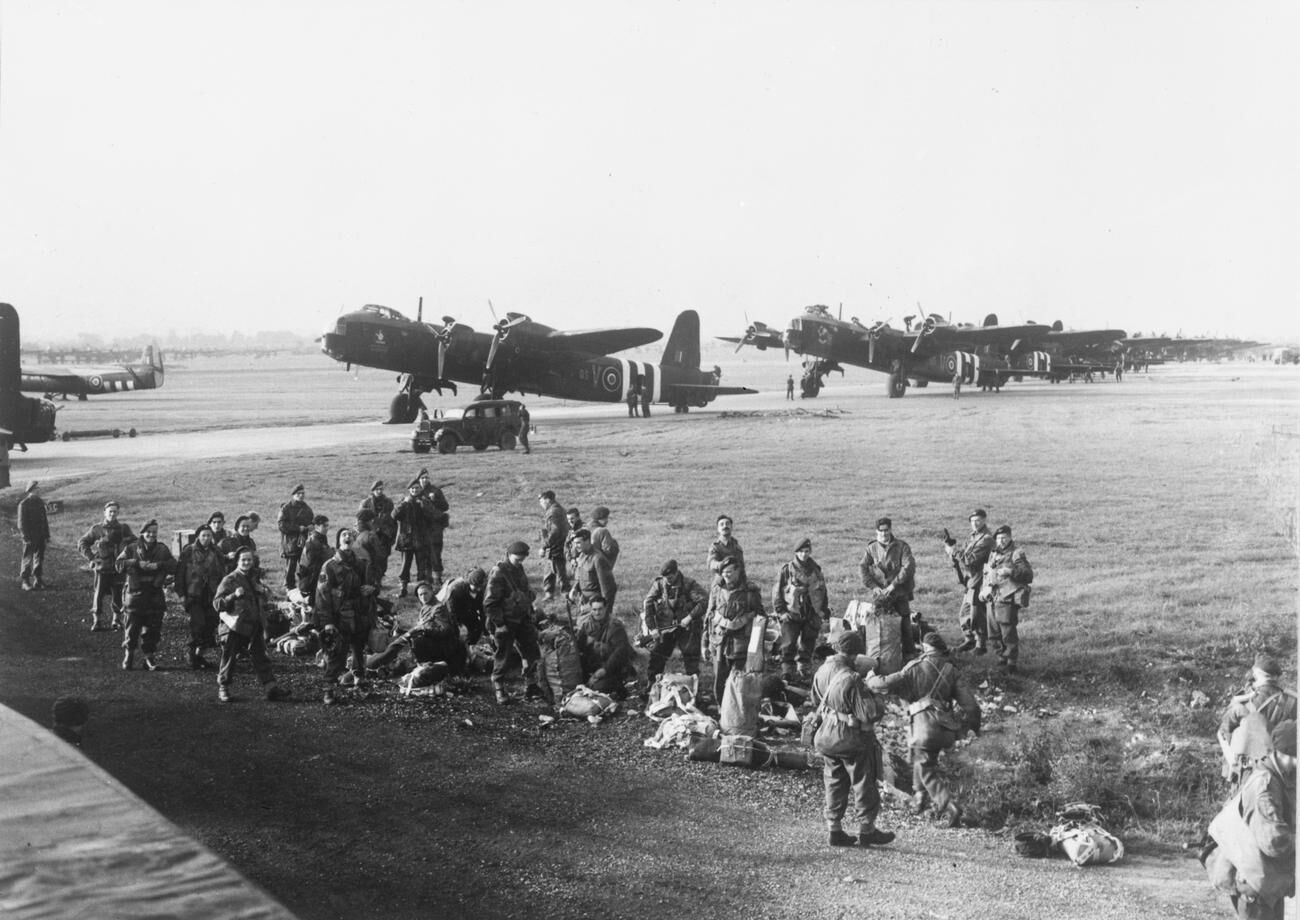
Paratroopers assemble near Mk.IV Stirlings of 620 Squadron during Operation Market Garden in September 1944

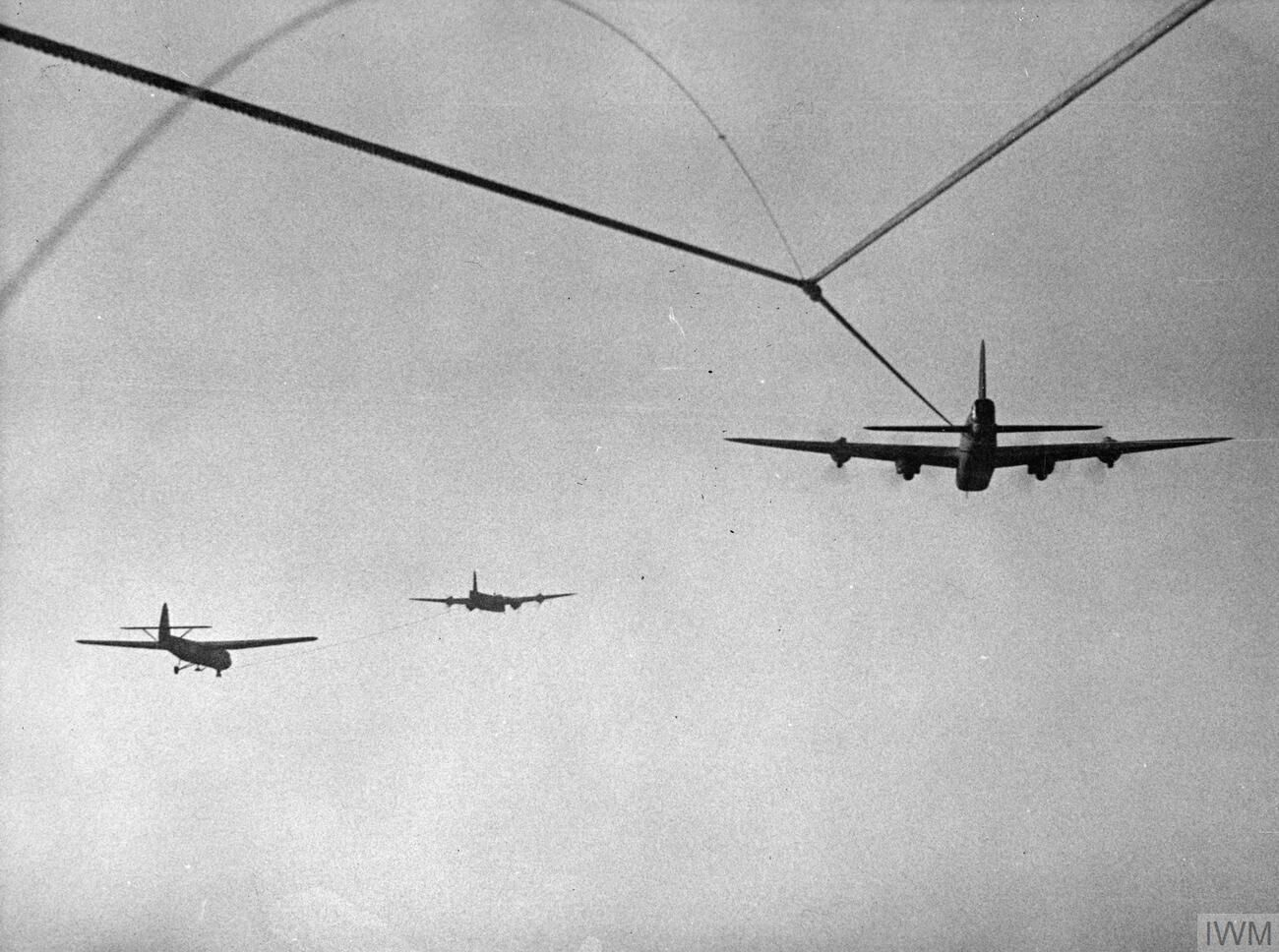
Photograph taken from an Airspeed Horsa glider cockpit, while under tow by a Stirling during Operation Varsity, 24 March 1945

During 1943, it had been recognised that there would be a requirement for a force of powerful aircraft capable of towing heavy transport gliders, such as the General Aircraft Hamilcar and Airspeed Horsa, it was found that the Stirling would fit this role admirably. During late 1943, 143 Mk.III bombers were converted as the Stirling Mk.IV, with no nose or dorsal turrets, which was used for towing gliders and dropping paratroops, in addition to 461 Mk.IVs that were manufactured. These aircraft were used for the deployment of Allied ground forces during the Battle of Normandy and Operation Market Garden. On 6 June 1944, several Stirlings were also used in Operation Glimmer for the precision-laying of patterns of "Window" to produce radar images of a decoy invasion fleet.

In May 1944, No. 138 (Special Duties) Squadron acquired 22 Stirlings to support resistance groups organised by the Special Operations Executive in Europe. Standard "C" Type containers for weapons and other stores could be loaded into the bomb bay and dropped like a payload of bombs. The Stirling could carry 18 of these; a particularly large load. Smaller panniers or packages could be carried in the Stirling's roomy rear fuselage and manually dropped through a hole in the floor by a dispatcher. Experiments with a roller-based conveyor to drop these packages faster than a dispatcher were delayed until the end of the war by concerns that this would involve too rapid a change in the aircraft's centre of gravity.

From late 1944, 160 of the special transport variant Stirling Mk V were built, which had the tail turret removed and a new nose opening added; most of these were completed after the war. By 1946, the Stirlings of Transport Command were being phased out and replaced by the Avro York, which was a transport derivative of the Lancaster that had previously replaced the Stirling in the bomber role. While many aircraft were scrapped, 12 Stirlings were modified to conform with S.37 standards and sold to Belgian charter operator Trans-Air in May 1947.

=== Victoria Cross recipients ===
In recognition of their deeds of valour, two Stirling pilots were posthumously awarded the Victoria Cross (VC). Both pilots held the rank of Flight Sergeant (Flt Sgt) and both were involved in bombing raids against Turin. Flt Sgt Rawdon Hume Middleton (RAAF) received his VC while serving as the captain of a Stirling from No. 149 Squadron RAF, during a raid in November 1942. Middleton was severely wounded and knocked unconscious by a direct hit from an AA shell. Upon regaining consciousness, Middleton insisted that Flt Sgt Leslie Hyder, the co-pilot, should dress his own wounds, while Middleton flew the badly damaged bomber. After it became clear that a crash was inevitable, Middleton ordered the rest of the crew to abandon the Stirling, while he maintained control. He was killed, along with the last two crew members to bail out. Acting Flt Sgt Arthur Louis Aaron, was awarded his VC as the captain of a No. 218 Squadron Stirling in a raid on Turin in August 1943. Aaron was badly wounded while piloting the aircraft and refused to rest, directing the flight engineer, who was acting as co-pilot, to fly to Rabah Bitat Airport (Bone Airfield), Algeria; he died following the aircraft's safe landing.

=== Service with other nations ===
One single captured Stirling was briefly tested by the German Kampfgeschwader 200 (KG 200), which tested, evaluated, and sometimes clandestinely operated captured enemy aircraft. Six Stirlings were purchased by the Egyptian Air Force for use in the 1948 Arab Israeli War, forming the 8th Bomber Squadron. These flew a number of air raids on Israeli targets in the 1948 war, one of their number being lost either as a result of an accident or sabotage. The remaining five appear to have been scrapped or retired by 1951.

== Operators ==
Belgium

- Trans-Air, later known as Air Transport (Post-war civilian use, a total of 10 planes, 9 of which went on to the Egyptian Air Force. The 10th (OO-XAC, ex-PK172) crashed during operations in Kunming, China)

Egypt

- Egyptian Air Force

Germany

- Luftwaffe

- KG 200
United Kingdom

- Royal Air Force

- Operational Units
  - No. 7 Squadron RAF: bomber unit, Mk.I August 1940 to July 1943, Mk.III March 1943 to July 1943. Operational from February 1941. Based at Leeming, then Oakington (October 1940).
  - No.11 Ferry Unit: September 1944 to August 1945. Based at Talbenny.
  - No.12 Ferry Unit: September 1944 to November 1945. Based at Melton Mowbray.
  - No. 15 Squadron RAF: bomber unit, Mk.I April 1941 to January 1943, Mk.III January 1943 to December 1943. Based at Wyton, then Bourn (August 1942), then Mildenhall (April 1943).
  - No. 46 Squadron RAF: air transport unit, January 1945 to February 1946. Based at Storney Cross.
  - No. 51 Squadron RAF: air transport unit, June 1945 to February 1946. Based at Leconfield, then Stradishall (August 1945).
  - No. 75 (New Zealand) Squadron: bomber unit, October 1942 to March 1944. based at Mildenhall, then Mepal (June 1943).
  - No. 90 Squadron RAF: bomber unit, November 1942 to June 1944. Operational from January 1943. Based at Bottesford, then Ridgewell (December 1942), then Wrattling Common (May 1943), then Tuddenham (October 1943).
  - No. 138 Squadron RAF: special duty service unit (air supply for resistance forces), Mk.IV June 1944 to March 1945.
  - No. 148 Squadron RAF: special duty service unit (air supply for resistance forces), Mk.IV November 1944 to December 1944. Based at Brindisi (Italy).
  - No. 149 Squadron RAF: bomber unit, Mk.I November 1941 to June 1943, Mk.III June 1943 to September 1944. Based at Mildehall, then Lakenheath (April 1942), then Methwold (May 1944).
  - No. 158 Squadron RAF: air transport unit, June 1945 to December 1945. Based at Lissett, then Stradsihall (August 1945).
  - No. 161 Squadron RAF. special duty service unit (air supply for resistance forces), Mk.IV and Mk.V April 1942 to June 1945. Based at Tempsford.
  - No. 171 Squadron RAF: bomber support unit (electronic countermeasures), Mk.III September 1944 to January 1945. Based at North Creake.
  - No. 190 Squadron RAF: glider-towing unit, Mk. IV January 1944 to May 1945. Based at Leicester East, then Fairford (March 1944), then Great Dunnow (October 1944).
  - No. 196 Squadron RAF: bomber support unit (electronic countermeasures), Mk.III July 1943 to February 1944, Mk.IV February 1944 to March 1946. Based at Witchford, then Leicester East (November 43), Tarrant Rushton (January 1944), Keevil (March 1944,) Wethersfield (October 1944), Shepherds Grove (January 1945).
  - No. 199 Squadron RAF: bomber unit, July 1943 to May 1944, then bomber support unit (electronic countermeasures), May 1944 to May 1945. Based at Lakenheath, then North Creake (May 1944).
  - No. 214 Squadron RAF: bomber unit, April 1942 to January 1944. Based at Stradishall, then Chedburgh (October 1942), Downham Market (December 1943), Sculthorpe (January 1944),
  - No. 218 Squadron RAF: bomber unit, January 1942 to August 1944. Based at Maraham, then Downham Market (July 1942), Woolfox Lodge (March 1944), Methwold (August 1944).
  - No. 242 Squadron RAF: air transport unit, February 1945 to December 1945. Based at Stoeney Cross.
  - No. 295 Squadron RAF: air transport unit, Mk.IV July 1944 to January 1946. Based at Harwell, then Rivenhall (October 1944).
  - No. 299 Squadron RAF: air transport unit, Mk.IV January 1944 to February 1946, based at Stoney Cross, then Keevil (March 1941), Wethersfield (October 1944), Shepherds Grove (January 1945).
  - No. 513 Squadron RAF: bomber unit, Mk.I September 1943 to October 1943, Mk.III October 1943 to November 1943. Based at Witchford.
  - No. 525 Squadron RAF: air transport unit, one single Stirling attached for trials June 1944 to August 1944. Based at Lyneham.
  - No. 570 Squadron RAF: air transport unit, Mk.IV July 1944 to January 1946. based at Harwell, then Rivenhall (October 1944).
  - No. 620 Squadron RAF: bomber unit, Mk.I June 1943 to August 1943, Mk.III August 1943 to February 1944, Mk.IV February 1944 to July 1945. Airborne support unit (transport) from November 1943. Based at Chedburgh, then Leicester East (November 1943), Fairford (March 1944), Great Dunmow (October 1944).
  - No. 622 Squadron RAF: bomber unit, Mk.III August 1943 to December 1943. Based at Mildenhall.
  - No. 623 Squadron RAF. bomber unit, Mk.III August 1943 to December 1943. Based at Downham Market.
  - No. 624 Squadron RAF: special operations support unit, Ml.IV June 1944 to September 1944. Based at Blida (Algeria).
  - No.1375 Heavy Transport Unit: October 1945 to April 1946. Based at Wethersfield.
  - No.1588 (Heavy Freighter) Flight: October 1945 to May 1946. Based at Bombay (India).
  - No.1589 (Heavy Freighter) Flight: October 1945 to May 1946. Based at Cairo (Egypt)

- Training Units
  - No.7 Conversion Flight: October 1941 to October 1942. Based at Oakington.
  - No.15 Conversion Flight: January 1942 to May 1942. Based at Alconbury, then Waterbeach (May 1942).
  - No.21 Heavy Glider Conversion Unit: Julu 1945 to August 1945. Based at Brize Norton.
  - No.26 Conversion Flight: November 1941 to January 1942. Based at Waterbeach.
  - No.101 Conversion Flight: ??? 1941 to October 1942. Based at Oakington.
  - No.149 Conversion Flight: November 1941 to October 1942. Based at Mildenhall.
  - No.214 Conversion Flight: April 1942 to October 1942. Based at Waterbeach (Stradishall from May 1942 to August 1942).
  - No.218 Conversion Flight: January 1942 to October 1942. Based at Barton Bendish.
  - No.303 Ferry Training Unit: September 1942 to September 1944. Based at Talbenny.
  - No.304 Ferry Training Unit: December 1942 to October 1944. Based at Melton Mowbray.
  - No.1332 Heavy Conversion Unit: air transport training, August 1942 to May 1945. Based at Longtown, then Nutt's Corner (October 1942), Riccall (April 1945).
  - No.1427 (Training) Flight: December 1941 to April 1943. Based at Thruxton, then Hullavington (May 1942), Marham (August 1942), Stradishall (October 1942).
  - No.1651 Heavy Conversion Unit: January 1942 to December 1944. Based at Waterbeach, then Wratting Common (November 1943), then Woolfox Lodge(November 1944).
  - No.1653 Heavy Conversion Unit: November 1943 to November 1944. Based at Chedburgh.
  - No.1654 Heavy Conversion Unit: December 1942 to January 1943. Based at Wigsley.
  - No.1657 Heavy Conversion Unit: October 1942 to December 1944. Based at Stradishall (Shepherd's Grove from May to October 1944).
  - No.1660 Heavy Conversion Unit: November 1943 to January 1945. Based at Swinderby.
  - No.1661 Heavy Conversion Unit: November 1943 to December 1944. Based at Winthorpe.
  - No.1655 Heavy Conversion Unit: May 1943 to July 1946. Based at Waterbeach, then Woolfox Lodge (June 1943), Tilstock (January 1944), Saltby (March 1945), Marston Moor (August 1945), Linton-on-Ouse (November 1945).
  - Navigation Training Unit, Pathfinder Force: April 1943 to March 1944. Based at Gransden Lodge, then at Warboys (June 1943).
  - Operational and Refresher Training Unit: February 1945 to October 1945. Based at Matching.

== Variants ==
Short S.31
Half-scale flying test-bed, powered by 4x Pobjoy Niagara 7-cylinder radial engines
Stirling I
Powered by Bristol Hercules XI engines.
Stirling II
Powered by 1,600 hp (1,200 kW) Wright R-2600 Twin Cyclone engines. Four prototypes built.
Stirling III
Heavy bomber, powered by Bristol Hercules XVI engines.
Stirling IV
Para-dropping and glider towing assault transport, powered by Bristol Hercules XVI engines.
Stirling V
Cargo aircraft, powered by Bristol Hercules XVI engines.

== Surviving aircraft ==
Stirling BK716 was recovered using a grapple between 31 August and 9 October 2020 from Markermeer, Netherlands, and parts of it are to be put on display.

Two sections of Stirlings have been displayed in museums. At the Musée du terrain d'aviation militaire in Vraux, France there are sections of the rear fuselage of Stirling LK142, a No. 196 Squadron RAF aircraft that crashed near Spincourt on 24 September 1944. The second section is at the Museum Vliegbasis in Deelen, Netherlands, and comes from No. 299 Squadron RAF Stirling LK545 which crashed near Nijmegen on 23 September 1944. A piece of the fuselage was cut off and used as a pig sty on a farm in Beuningen until transferred to a museum in 2003.

In September 2019, 75 years after the liberation of the southern Netherlands, excavation started on Stirling W7630 in Lilbosch Abbey near Pey, Echt, Netherlands, which crashed on 10 September 1942. The crew did not survive the crash and the excavation team expects remains to be found and anticipate the wreckage being buried 9.8 ft (3 m) into the ground. The excavation was delayed for many years as the aircraft was severely damaged on impact and it is unknown if unexploded bombs are present.

In 1986, the RAF Sub-Aqua Association investigated raising No. 196 Squadron RAF Stirling EF311 which ditched offshore from Selsey Bill on 26 August 1943. After assessing the wreck, which lay at a depth of 60 ft (18 m), the group decided against proceeding.

In 1994 the same group looked at the possibility of raising No.196 Squadron Stirling LJ925, which crashed on 25 February 1945 in Hølen Lake, near Arendal, Norway and which had been discovered at a depth of 35 ft (11 m) buried in mud and tree bark shavings. This plan was also abandoned, although the group recovered a propeller blade.

During preparations for the laying of the North Sea Link electrical cable in 2017, remains suspected to be of a Stirling were found in the North Sea between England and Norway.

In September 1977, wreckage of Stirling LK488, which crashed on Mickle Fell in the Pennines on 19 October 1944, was recovered by the RAF. In 2023, the tail section from LK488 went on display at the Royal Air Force Museum London, while a fuselage section was placed on display at the Museum's Cosford site.

In the absence of any complete surviving aircraft the "Stirling Aircraft Project" was set up in the late 1990s to make a recreation of the forward fuselage section of a Stirling, largely from new fabrication.

In August 2025 archeologists recovered the wreck of a Short Stirling near Kerpen-Manheim in the Hambach surface mine, where the aircraft EF427 had crashed on 31 July 1943 after it had been hit by anti-aircraft fire during a raid on Remscheid. The digging team transported 17 boxes of aircraft parts to the Rheinisches Landesmuseum Bonn. The human remains found at the site, potentially the four missing crew members, are due to be identified by DNA testing.

== Specifications (Short Stirling I) ==
3-view drawing of Short Stirling Mark I, with profile of the glider-tug/transport Mark IV.

Data from The Short Stirling, Aircraft in Profile Number 142, Flight International and Shorts aircraft since 1900

General characteristics

- Crew: 7 (First and second pilot, navigator/bomb aimer, front gunner/WT operator, two air gunners, and flight engineer)
- Length: 87 ft 3 in (26.59 m)
- Wingspan: 99 ft 1 in (30.20 m)
- Height: 22 ft 9 in (6.93 m)
- Wing area: 1,460 sq ft (136 m^{2})
- Aspect ratio: 6.5:1
- Empty weight: 49,600 lb (22,498 kg)
- Gross weight: 59,400 lb (26,943 kg)
- Max takeoff weight: 70,000 lb (31,751 kg)
- Fuel capacity: 2,254 imp gal (10,250 L; 2,707 US gal) standard
- Powerplant: 4 × Bristol Hercules XI 14-cylinder air-cooled sleeve-valve radial piston engines, 1,500 hp (1,100 kW) each
- Propellers: 3-bladed metal fully feathering constant-speed propeller, 13 ft 6 in (4.11 m) diameter

Performance

- Maximum speed: 282 mph (454 km/h, 245 kn) at 12,500 ft (3,800 m)
- Cruise speed: 200 mph (320 km/h, 170 kn)
- Range: 2,330 mi (3,750 km, 2,020 nmi)
- Service ceiling: 16,500 ft (5,000 m)
- Rate of climb: 800 ft/min (4.1 m/s)

Armament

- Guns: 8 × 0.303 in (7.7 mm) Browning machine guns: 2 × in powered nose turret, 4 × in tail turret, 2 × in dorsal turret
- Bombs: Up to 14,000 lb (6,400 kg) of bombs

== See also ==
External videos
- Period News Report on the Short Stirling
- Recording of a talk held by a former Stirling pilot on his wartime experiences with the aircraft
- Documentary on the Stirling bomber

- MacRobert's Reply

Related development

- Short Sunderland

Aircraft of comparable role, configuration, and era

- Avro Lancaster
- Boeing B-17 Flying Fortress
- Consolidated B-24 Liberator
- Handley Page Halifax
- Petlyakov Pe-8

Related lists

- List of aircraft of World War II
- List of bomber aircraft
- List of aircraft of the Royal Air Force
