= List of aircraft (Br–Bz) =

This is a list of aircraft in alphabetical order beginning with 'Br' through 'Bz'.

== Br-bz ==
=== Bradley ===
(Chico, CA)

- Bradley BA-100 Aerobat
- Bradley BA-200 ATAC
- Bradley BA-300 Himat

=== Bradley ===
(Curtiss Bradley, Tulsa, OK)

- Bradley LRB-1

=== Bradley ===
(Ben R. Bradley, Fort Lauderdale, FL)

- Bradley Imp

=== Brædstrup ===
- Brædstrup Ultralet Fly BUF 1

=== Brain ===
(Jacob T & Jacob J Brain, Paterson, NJ)

- Brain 1933 monoplane

=== Braley Beezle Bug ===
((Thomas) Braley Aircraft Co, 211 E Douglas Ave and 6400 E Franklin Rd, Wichita, KS)

- Braley B-1
- Braley B2-K5
- Braley B2-R5
- Braley B2-J6
- Braley B-2C6

=== Brändli ===
(Max Brändli)

- Brändli BX-2 Cherry

=== Brandt ===
(Michel Brandt)

- Brandt Kochab

=== Brantly ===
(Brantly Helicopter Corp)

- Brantly B-1
- Brantly B-2
- Brantly B-2A
- Brantly B-2B
- Brantly B-3
- Brantly 305
- Brantly HO-3
- Brantly-Hynes H-5T

=== Bratu ===
(Romulus Bratu)

- Bratu 220

=== Bratukhin ===
- Bratukhin AK
- Bratukhin Omega
- Bratukhin Omega II
- Bratukhin 2MG
- Bratukhin VNP
- Bratukhin G-2
- Bratukhin G-3
- Bratukhin G-4
- Bratukhin B-5
- Bratukhin B-6
- Bratukhin B-7
- Bratukhin B-8
- Bratukhin B-9
- Bratukhin B-10
- Bratukhin B-11
- Bratukhin B-12

=== Braunschweig ===
(TU-Braunschweig, Institut für Luftfahrtmeßtechnik und Flugmeteorologie)

- Braunschweig LF-1 Zaunkönig

=== Brazil Lion ===
((Lion Aircraft Co, Chicago, IL / Brazil Aircraft Corp., Brazil, IN]]

- Brazil Lion Safety Plane

=== Brditschka ===
see also HB-Flugtechnik

- Brditschka HB-3
- Brditschka HB-21
- Brditschka HB-23
- Militky-Brditschka MB-E1

=== Breda ===
(Società Italiana Ernesto Breda)

- Breda A.1 (Breda Ba.1)
- Breda A.2
- Breda A.3
- Breda A.4
- Breda A.7
- Breda A.8
- Breda A.9
- Breda A.10
- Breda A.14
- Breda B.1
- Breda B.4
- Breda M.1
- Breda CC.20
- Breda Triplano
- Breda Ba.15
- Breda Ba.16
- Breda Ba.19
- Breda Ba.25
- Breda Ba.26
- Breda Ba.27
- Breda Ba.27 Metallico
- Breda Ba.28
- Breda Ba.32
- Breda Ba.33
- Breda Ba.39
- Breda Ba.42
- Breda Ba.44
- Breda Ba.46
- Breda Ba.64
- Breda Ba.65
- Breda Ba.75
- Breda Ba.79S
- Breda Ba.82
- Breda Ba.88
- Breda Ba.92
- Breda Ba.201
- Breda Ba.205
- Breda-Pensuti B.2
- Breda-Zappata BZ.301 medium bomber
- Breda-Zappata BZ.302 heavy fighter
- Breda-Zappata BZ.303 night fighter
- Breda-Zappata BZ.304
- Breda-Zappata BZ.305
- Breda-Zappata BZ.306
- Breda-Zappata BZ.308
- Breda-Zappata BZ.309
- Breda-Zappata BZ.401

=== Bredelet-Gros ===
- Bredelet-Gros BG-01 Gerfaut

=== Breecher ===
(Ray N. Breecher)

- Breecher 1936 monoplane

=== Breese ===
(Breese Aircraft Corp, Portland, OR)

- Breese-Dallas Model 1 - (Breese & (Charles) Dallas Inc.)
- Breese-Wilde Model 5 - prototype Breese 5
- Breese 5
- Breese Junior
- Breese LP-2
- Breese LT-1
- Breese Penguin
- Breese R-6-3
- Breese R-6-C
- Breese & Dallas X
- Michigan Model 1
- Breese-Wild - prototype Breese 5

=== Breezer Aircraft gmbh ===
- Breezer Breezer

=== Breezy ===
(Robert Liposky, Charles Roloff, Carl Unger, Oak Lawn, IL)

- Breezy RLU-1

=== Bréguet ===
(Société Anonyme des Ateliers d’Aviation Louis BREGUET)

- Bréguet 4
- Bréguet 5
- Bréguet 6
- Bréguet 11 Corsaire
- Bréguet 12
- Breguet 13 (A.G.4)
- Breguet 13 (AV 1 / Bre 14)
- Bréguet 14
- Bréguet 16
- Bréguet 17
- Breguet 18T
- Bréguet 19
- Bréguet 20 Leviathan
- Bréguet 21 Leviathan
- Bréguet 22 Leviathan
- Bréguet 23 unbuilt bomber project
- Bréguet 24 unbuilt single-seat fighter for C.1 program
- Bréguet 25
- Bréguet 26T
- Bréguet 27
- Bréguet 270
- Breguet 271
- Bréguet 272
- Bréguet 273
- Bréguet 274
- Bréguet 280T
- Bréguet 281T
- Bréguet 284T
- Bréguet 29 projected seaplane version of 27
- Bréguet 30T large twin-fuselage/triple-boom flying-wing airliner
- Bréguet 310 airliner with 280T fuselage and 27 wing
- Bréguet 320 military three-seat aircraft with 27 wing
- Bréguet 330
- Bréguet 340 all-metal twin-engine version of 27
- Bréguet 350 version of 27 with twin (tandem) engines
- Bréguet 360 three-engine, five-seat night bomber
- Bréguet 370T planned transport version of 360, led to the 371
- Bréguet 371T sesquiplane design with wings from the 27
- Bréguet 380 four-engine version of 27
- Bréguet 390T
- Bréguet 391T
- Bréguet 392T
- Bréguet 393T
- Bréguet 401 7 ton, 60-seat trimotor biplane airliner
- Bréguet 410
- Bréguet 411
- Bréguet 412
- Bréguet 413
- Bréguet 414
- Bréguet 420
- Bréguet 450 projected enlarged version of 270
- Bréguet 460 Vultur
- Bréguet 462
- Bréguet 470 Fulgur
- Bréguet 480 torpedo bomber project
- Bréguet 481 torpedo bomber project
- Bréguet 482
- Bréguet 483T four-engine, 23-seat airliner; led to the 500
- Bréguet 484 34-seat, four-engine, high-altitude airliner; became the 1012
- Bréguet 500 Colmar
- Bréguet 501 Colmar unbuilt version of 500 with Bristol Hercules engines
- Bréguet 510 heavy four-engine biplane flying boat
- Bréguet 510 Colmar stretched version of the 500
- Bréguet 520
- Bréguet 521 Bizerte
- Bréguet 522
- Bréguet 530T Saigon
- Bréguet 540 version of 530 with Hispano-Suiza engines
- Bréguet 550 Colmar version of 500 with Pratt & Whitney Twin Wasp engines
- Bréguet 560 version of 520 with Hispano-Suiza engines
- Bréguet 580 land-based version of 521 as BN5
- Bréguet 590 multi-engine version of 521
- Bréguet 600 (I) amphibian version of 521
- Bréguet 600 (II) combat aircraft
- Bréguet 610
- Bréguet 640T 15 ton, twin-engine monoplane for Air France
- Bréguet 641T airliner for South Atlantic routes
- Bréguet 660 militarized version of 670
- Bréguet 670T
- Bréguet 680 three-engine version of 670 for transatlantic routes
- Bréguet 690
- Bréguet 691
- Bréguet 693
- Bréguet 694
- Bréguet 695
- Bréguet 696
- Bréguet 697
- Bréguet 698
- Bréguet 699
- Bréguet 700 heavy fighter
- Bréguet 701 four-engine airliner/liaison aircraft, version of 69
- Bréguet 702 four-engine transport/liaison aircraft, version of 69
- Bréguet 710 three-engine, 32 passenger flying boat airliner
- Bréguet 720 four-seat night bomber
- Bréguet 730
- Bréguet 731
- Bréguet 732 enlarged 730 with Pratt & Whitney R-1830 engines
- Bréguet 733 enlarged 730 with Wright R-1820 engines
- Bréguet 740 four-engine passenger flying boat based on 730
- Bréguet 741 larger version of 740
- Bréguet 750 four-engine flying boat developed from the 730
- Bréguet 760 four-engine, 56 passenger double-deck airliner design, led to the 761
- Bréguet 761 Deux-Ponts
- Bréguet 762 Deux-Ponts unbuilt version of 761 with Bristol Hercules 630 engines
- Bréguet 763 Provence
- Bréguet 764
- Bréguet 765 Super Deux-Ponts projected improved variant
- Bréguet 765 Sahara
- Bréguet 770 four-engine heavy bomber project
- Bréguet 771 six-engine heavy bomber project
- Bréguet 780 (I) twin-fin flying boat project
- Bréguet 780 (II) six-engine heavy bomber project
- Bréguet 781 four-engine heavy bomber project
- Bréguet 790 Nautilus
- Bréguet 791
- Bréguet 792
- Bréguet 800 carrier-launched four-engine twin-float, twin-fin seaplane airliner project with folding wings
- Bréguet 801
- Bréguet 802
- Bréguet 803
- Bréguet 810 carrier attack-bomber based on 693
- Bréguet 820 twin-engine heavy fighter project
- Bréguet 830 four-engine flying boat project
- Bréguet 831 projected 45 passenger transport version of 830
- Bréguet 840 large double-deck, twin-fin airliner developed from the 730 and 740
- Bréguet 841 cargo version
- Bréguet 842 high-altitude version
- Bréguet 843 high-altitude transatlantic version
- Bréguet 850 large twin-boom, seven-engine transport with contra-rotating propellers
- Bréguet 851 large, 28-engine transport project
- Bréguet 860 school flying boat
- Bréguet 870 large, six-engine passenger flying boat with contra-rotating propellers
- Bréguet 880 twin-engine patrol flying boat project
- Bréguet 890 Mercure
- Bréguet 891R Mars
- Bréguet 892S Mercure
- Bréguet 893S
- Bréguet 894
- Bréguet 895H
- Bréguet 895 (II) four-engine ASW aircraft project, not related to 890 series
- Bréguet 900 four-engine transport aircraft project
- Bréguet 900 Louisette
- Bréguet 901 Mouette
- Bréguet 902 Cinzano
- Bréguet 903 experimental glider
- Bréguet 904 Nymphale
- Bréguet 905 Fauvette
- Bréguet 906 Choucas
- Bréguet 907 glider project
- Bréguet 910 air-to-surface missile project (AS.10)
- Bréguet 920 surface-to-air missile project (SA.30) with SEPR rocket engine
- Bréguet 940 Integral
- Bréguet 941
- Bréguet 942 proposed pressurized airliner version
- Bréguet 943 military cargo transport version
- Bréguet 944 enlarged, high-wing short-haul version for 150 passengers
- Bréguet 945 shrunken version of the 942 for military use
- Bréguet 946 (I) civilian version of 941
- Bréguet 946 (II) larger four-engine STOL with double-deck fuselage
- Bréguet 947 enlarged version of 943
- Bréguet 950 training/observation twin-boom amphibian flying boat project
- Bréguet 960 Vultur
- Bréguet 961 Vultur attack variant
- Bréguet 962 Vultur attack variant
- Bréguet 962 Vultur ASW variant
- Bréguet 963 experimental aircraft for blown flap trials
- Bréguet 965 Épaulard second 960 prototype modified for ASW role; prototype for the 1050
- Bréguet 966 ASW variant with Rolls-Royce Dart engine; became the 1050
- Bréguet 970 light helicopter project
- Bréguet 970 Fulgur
- Bréguet 978 medium-range twin engine jetliner with crescent-shaped wing
- Bréguet 990 mixed-power ASW aircraft project
- Bréguet 1000 large 12-engine transport project
- Bréguet 1001 Taon
- Bréguet 1010 Apterion VTOL fighter project
- Bréguet 1011 Capricorne transport prototype
- Bréguet 1020 two-seat observation aircraft for ALAT
- Bréguet 1030 experimental fan-in-wing convertible aircraft project
- Bréguet 1050 Alizé
- Bréguet 1060 COIN aircraft project
- Bréguet 1080
- Bréguet 1100
- Bréguet 1110 VTOL fighter project
- Bréguet 1120 Sirocco fighter-bomber project
- Bréguet 1150 Atlantic
- Bréguet 1210 Jaguar
- Bréguet Aerhydroplane
- Bréguet Type I
- Bréguet Type II
- Bréguet Type III
- Bréguet Type IV
- Bréguet Type V
- Bréguet Type VI
- Bréguet Type VII
- Bréguet Type VIII
- Bréguet Type IX
- Bréguet Type X
- Bréguet Type XI 'Corsaire'
- Bréguet Type XII
- Bréguet Type XIII
- Bréguet-Dorand Gyroplane Laboratoire
- Bréguet-Richet Gyroplane
- Bréguet G.11E Gyroplane
- Bréguet G.111 Gyroplane
- Bréguet LE 'Laboratoire Eiffel'
- Bréguet S.8/2 Calcutta Short S.8 Calcutta derivative
- Breguet C-U 1
- Breguet C-U 2
- Breguet G.2
- Breguet G.2bis
- Breguet G.3
- Breguet H.I-U 3
- Breguet A.G.4
- Breguet T.O-2
- Breguet U.1
- Bréguet BLC
- Breguet BAC
- Breguet BAM
- Breguet BC
- Breguet-Michelin BM
- Breguet-Michelin BU3
- Breguet-Michelin BUM
- Breguet-Michelin BUC
  - Breguet-Michelin Type V
  - Breguet-Michelin Type VI
- Breguet AV1
- Breguet AV2
- Breguet No.19 biplane
- Breguet BU-3 militaire
- Bréguet Colibri
- Breguet SN3
- Breguet BM4

=== Bretthauer ===
- Bretthauer Lewann DD-1

=== Brewster ===
(Claude Brewster, Toledo, OH)

- Brewster 1936 biplane

=== Brewster ===
(Brewster and Co, Aircraft Div, Long Island City, NY)

- Brewster 33A
- Brewster B-139
- Brewster B-239
- Brewster B-339
- Brewster B-439
- Brewster B-340
- Brewster A-32
- Brewster A-34
- Brewster Bermuda
- Brewster F2A Buffalo
- Brewster F3A Corsair
- Brewster SB2A Buccaneer
- Brewster SBA
- Brewster-Fleet B-1
- Brewster R340

=== Briegleb ===
see also: Sailplane Corporation of America

- Briegleb BG-6
- Briegleb BG-7
- Briegleb BG-8
- Briegleb BG 12
- Briegleb TG-9
- Briegleb TG-13

=== Briffaud ===
(Georges Briffaud)

- Briffaud GB.4
- Briffaud GB.5
- Briffaud GB.6
- Briffaud GB.8
- Briffaud GB.9
- Briffaud GB.10 Pou-Push
- Briffaud GB.11
- Briffaud GB.60
- Briffaud GB.80

=== Briggs ===
(Harold H Briggs, Beaverton, OR)

- Briggs Briggster
- Briggs Special
- Briggs-Marion

=== Brink (aircraft constructor) ===
- Brink Model B Aeronca conversion?

=== Brinn ===
(Daniel J Brinn, Garden City, KS)

- Brinn SA-3

=== Bristol ===
(designations for aircraft built prior to 1923 were applied retroactively)

- Bristol Type 1 Scout C
- Bristol Type 2 Scout D
- Bristol Type 3 Scout D
- Bristol Type 4 Scout D
- Bristol Type 5 Scout D
- Bristol Type 6 T.T.A
- Bristol Type 7 F.3A
- Bristol Type 8 S.2A
- Bristol Type 9 R.2A initial design for F.2A
- Bristol Type 10 M.1A
- Bristol Type 11 M.1B
- Bristol Type 12 F.2A Fighter
- Bristol Type 13 MR.1
- Bristol Type 14 F.2B Fighter (Mk.I and II)
- Bristol Type 15 F.2B Fighter with Sunbeam Arab
- Bristol Type 16 F.2B Fighter with Hispano-Suiza
- Bristol Type 17 F.2B Fighter with Hispano-Suiza
- Bristol Type 18 Scout E (cancelled)
- Bristol Type 19 Pusher Scout (cancelled)
- Bristol Type 20 M.1C
- Bristol Type 21 Scout F
- Bristol Type 22 F.2B Fighter with Salmson radial (cancelled)
- Bristol Type 22A F.2B Fighter with ABC Dragonfly radial (cancelled)
- Bristol Type 22B F.2B Fighter with Bentley B.R.2 rotary (cancelled)
- Bristol Type 23 Badger
- Bristol Type 24 Braemar I
- Bristol Type 25 Braemar II
- Bristol Type 26 Pullman
- Bristol Type 27 Tourer
- Bristol Type 28 Tourer
- Bristol Type 29 Tourer
- Bristol Type 30 Babe I
- Bristol Type 31 Grampus I
- Bristol Type 32 Bullet
- Bristol Type 33 Pullman
- Bristol Type 34 three-seat tourer based on F.2B
- Bristol Type 35 two-seat seaplane to Type XXI
- Bristol Type 36 Seely
- Bristol Type 37 Tramp
- Bristol Type 38 AH.2 two-seat fighter for USA
- Bristol Type 39 AH.1 single-seat fighter for USA
- Bristol Type 40 F.2B Fighter (late production)
- Bristol Type 41 tourer floatplane
- Bristol Type 42 Grampus II
- Bristol Type 43 Grampus IV
- Bristol Type 44 Tramp Boat
- Bristol Type 45 Scandinavian Tourer
- Bristol Type 46 Babe II
- Bristol Type 46A Babe III (unflown)
- Bristol Type 47 3 seat coupe
- Bristol Type 48 tourer floatplane
- Bristol Type 49 Lucifer three-seat biplane tourer
- Bristol Type 50 Mail Carrier four-engine triplane mailplane
- Bristol Type 51 Lucifer Boat four-seat pusher biplane flying boat
- Bristol Type 52 Bullfinch Mk.I
- Bristol Type 53 Bullfinch Mk.II
- Bristol Type 54 HP Seaplane single-seat floatplane
- Bristol Type 55 long-range tractor biplane bomber to 2/20
- Bristol Type 56 biplane troop carrier to 5/20
- Bristol Type 57 Grampus V
- Bristol Type 58 eight-seat passenger/cargo aircraft; developed into Type 62
- Bristol Type 59 Type 58 with Jupiter engine; developed into Type 75
- Bristol Type 60 three-seat coupe monoplane
- Bristol Type 61 three-seat pusher amphibian monoplane
- Bristol Type 62 Ten-seater
- Bristol Type 63 single-engine sports monoplane
- Bristol Type 64 single-engine high-speed monoplane
- Bristol Type 65 human-powered monoplane
- Bristol Type 66 single-engine hydrovane flying boat
- Bristol Type 67 two-seat, single-engine reconnaissance-fighter biplane
- Bristol Type 68 three-seat fleet gunnery spotting biplane
- Bristol Type 69 two-seat reconnaissance biplane
- Bristol Type 70 two-seat reconnaissance monoplane
- Bristol Type 71 three-seat coastal defense triplane
- Bristol Type 72 Racer
- Bristol Type 73 Taxiplane
- Bristol Type 74 three-engine, 26 seat triplane airliner
- Bristol Type 75 Ten-seater
- Bristol Type 76 Jupiter Fighter
- Bristol Type 77 M.1D re-engined M.1C
- Bristol Type 78 Fighter Type 'C'
- Bristol Type 79 Brandon
- Bristol Type 80 Fighter Type 'D'
- Bristol Type 81 Puma Trainer
- Bristol Type 81A Greek Military Tourer
- Bristol Type 82 coastal defense torpedo biplane
- Bristol Type 83 Primary Trainer
- Bristol Type 83E
- Bristol Type 84 Bloodhound
- Bristol Type 85 Seely re-engined Type 36
- Bristol Type 86 Greek Navy Tourer
- Bristol Type 87 three-seat reconnaissance fleet biplane
- Bristol Type 88 Bulgarian Tourer
- Bristol Type 88A Bulgarian Tourer
- Bristol Type 89 Trainer
- Bristol Type 90 Berkeley
- Bristol Type 91 Brownie
- Bristol Type 92 'Laboratory biplane'
- Bristol Type 93 Boarhound
- Bristol Type 93A Beaver
- Bristol Type 94 single-seat pusher biplane fighter
- Bristol Type 95 Bagshot
- Bristol Type 96 Fighter Mk.III
- Bristol Type 96A Fighter Mk.VI
- Bristol Type 97 single-engine biplane airliner for Imperial Airways
- Bristol Type 98 Brownie Mk.III
- Bristol Type 99 Badminton
- Bristol Type 100 twin-engine biplane airliner for Imperial Airways
- Bristol Type 101 two-seat biplane fighter
- Bristol Type 102A single-seat biplane fighter; derivative of Badminton
- Bristol Type 102B floatplane version of Type 102A
- Bristol Type 103 single-seat high-speed monoplane
- Bristol Type 104 single-seat light monoplane
- Bristol Type 105 Bulldog
- Bristol Type 106 two-seat general purpose biplane; DH.9A replacement
- Bristol Type 107 Bullpup
- Bristol Type 108 night bomber biplane to B.19/27
- Bristol Type 109
- Bristol Type 110A
- Bristol Type 111A cabin transport monoplane
- Bristol Type 111B smaller version of Type 111A
- Bristol Type 112 single-seat cannon fighter to F.29/27
- Bristol Type 113 three-engine airliner for Imperial Airways
- Bristol Type 114 8-seat cabin biplane; larger version of Type 110A
- Bristol Type 115 troop carrier monoplane to C.16/28
- Bristol Type 116 troop carrier biplane to C.16/28
- Bristol Type 117 twin-engine freighter; similar to Vickers Vellore
- Bristol Type 118 two-seat general purpose biplane
- Bristol Type 119 two-seat trainer version of Type 105; predecessor of Type 124
- Bristol Type 120 two-seat general purpose turret biplane to G.4/31
- Bristol Type 121 general purpose biplane with gun turret to G.4/31; as Type 120 but armed with a torpedo
- Bristol Type 122 as Type 121 but with pilot's cockpit forward of leading edge
- Bristol Type 123 single-seat fighter to F.7/30
- Bristol Type 124 Bulldog TM
- Bristol Type 125 two-seat general purpose monoplane to G.4/31; variant of Type 122
- Bristol Type 126 high-wing version of Type 125; variant of Type 122
- Bristol Type 127 single-seat monoplane fighter to F.7/30
- Bristol Type 128 Type 127 with Mercury engine
- Bristol Type 129 single-seat pusher monoplane fighter to F.7/30
- Bristol Type 130 Bombay
- Bristol Type 131 twin-engine day bomber to B.9/32
- Bristol Type 132 two-seat turret monoplane fighter
- Bristol Type 133 single-seat monoplane fighter to F.7/30
- Bristol Type 134 high-speed mail carrier monoplane
- Bristol Type 135 eight-seat high-speed monoplane transport
- Bristol Type 136 two-seat day bomber to P.27/32
- Bristol Type 137A twin-engine, 14-seat airliner; civil derivative of Bombay
- Bristol Type 137B twin-engine passenger-cargo (combi) aircraft, development of Bombay
- Bristol Type 138 cancelled high altitude monoplane project
- Bristol Type 138A high altitude monoplane
- Bristol Type 139 single-engine biplane freighter for Canada; civil version of Type 122
- Bristol Type 140 two-seat pusher fighter to F.5/33
- Bristol Type 141 three-seat, twin-engine fighter to F.22/33
- Bristol Type 142 Britain First
- Bristol Type 142M Blenheim
- Bristol Type 143 twin-engine, 10-seat transport
- Bristol Type 144 night bomber to B.3/34, developed from the Type 130
- Bristol Type 146 single-seat fighter to F.5/34
- Bristol Type 147 cancelled F.9/35 single-seat fighter project
- Bristol Type 148 two-seat army co-operation monoplane to A.39/34
- Bristol Type 149 Bolingbroke Blenheim Mk. IV built in Canada
- Bristol Type 150 twin-engine shore-based torpedo bomber to M.15/35; development of Blenheim
- Bristol Type 151 single-seat high-speed monoplane to 35/35; only a design study
- Bristol Type 152 Beaufort
- Bristol Type 153 cancelled F.37/35 twin engine turret fighter
- Bristol Type 154 four-engine, high wing, 24-seat airliner, similar to Avro 642; replacement for Fokker F.VII
- Bristol Type 155 twin-engine wood/metal bomber to B.17/38; developed into Armstrong-Whitworth Albemarle
- Bristol Type 156 Beaufighter
- Bristol Type 157 three-seat bomber version of Type 156
- Bristol Type 158 Beaufighter Mk. III/IV 'slim fuselage' version of Beaufighter
- Bristol Type 159 four-engine heavy bomber to B.1/39
- Bristol Type 160 Bisley
- Bristol Type 161 two-seat light bomber to B.7/40
- Bristol Type 162 Beaumont
- Bristol Type 163 Buckingham
- Bristol Type 164 Brigand
- Bristol Type 165 Brigand II dual control trainer version of Type 164
- Bristol Type 166 Buckmaster
- Bristol Type 167 Brabazon
- Bristol Type 168 bomber development of Type 167
- Bristol Type 169 photo reconnaissance variant of Type 163
- Bristol Type 170 Freighter
- Bristol Type 171 Sycamore
- Bristol Type 172 four/six-engine long-range jet bomber to B.35/46
- Bristol Type 173 twin-engine, twin rotor helicopter to E.3/47
- Bristol Type 174 scale model of Type 172 to E.8/47; glider
- Bristol Type 175 Britannia
- Bristol Type 176 swept-wing research aircraft to E.8/47/2
- Bristol Type 177 twin-engine jet fighter to F.3/48
- Bristol Type 178 rocket fighter to F.124T
- Bristol Type 179 Freighter replacement for Type 170
- Bristol Type 180 supersonic fighter developed from the Type 177
- Bristol Type 181 BEA Helicopter 30/50 seat twin-rotor helicopter
- Bristol Type 182 Red Rapier
- Bristol Type 183 research aircraft to ER.110T
- Bristol Type 184 delta-wing research aircraft
- Bristol Type 185 rocket-powered research aircraft
- Bristol Type 186 long-range low-level bomber to B.126T/OR.324
- Bristol Type 187 Britannia 600 Type 175 replacement
- Bristol Type 188 high-speed research aircraft to ER.134T
- Bristol Type 189 maritime reconnaissance aircraft developed from the Type 175
- Bristol Type 190 ultra-light helicopter with tip jets to HR.144T
- Bristol Type 191 naval development of Type 173 to NA.43/HR.146D
- Bristol Type 192 Belvedere
- Bristol Type 193 variant of Type 191 for the RCN
- Bristol Type 194 civil version of Type 192
- Bristol Type 195 high-wing rear loading military freighter with Type 175 wing
- Bristol Type 196 flying bomb developed from the Type 188
- Bristol Type 197 BLC Transport various studies for boundary layer control
- Bristol Type 198 various studies for SST
- Bristol Type 199 tiltrotor convertiplane, VTOL design
- Bristol Type 200 short-range airliner proposal; resembled the Boeing 727
- Bristol Type 201 long-range development of Type 200 for BOAC
- Bristol Type 202 medium-range low-altitude bomber
- Bristol Type 203 8-passenger turboshaft development of Type 171
- Bristol Type 204 1957 Tactical strike and reconnaissance project to GOR.339
- Bristol Type 205 four-engine, short-range airliner developed from the Type 200
- Bristol Type 206 maritime reconnaissance aircraft to NBMR-2
- Bristol Type 207
- Bristol Type 208 V/STOL freighter to GOR.351
- Bristol Type 209 Type 208 with fan lift
- Bristol Type 210 smaller version of Type 208
- Bristol Type 211 short-range version of Type 205 with wing-mounted engines
- Bristol Type 212 military strategic transport
- Bristol Type 213 supersonic transport aircraft
- Bristol Type 214 utility helicopter developed from the Type 203
- Bristol Type 215 slender delta research glider to X.197T
- Bristol Type 216 freighter/car ferry replacement of Type 170
- Bristol Type 217 VTOL strike/reconnaissance aircraft to OR.345
- Bristol Type 218 light communications aircraft
- Bristol Type 219 five-seat executive aircraft
- Bristol Type 220 five-seat executive aircraft
- Bristol Type 221 Fairey FD.2 converted to ogee wing; to ER.193D
- Bristol Type 222 Lockheed C-130 with BLC to GOR.351
- Bristol Type 223 slender delta SST
- Bristol Type 224 V/STOL transport to NBMR-4 for NATO
- Bristol Type 225 STOL transport to GOR.351 for RAF
- Bristol-Burney seaplanes
- Bristol-Coanda Biplane
- Bristol Coanda Monoplanes
- Bristol-Zodiac biplane
- Bristol 1911 Monoplane
- Bristol Advanced Trainers
- Bristol Biplane Type 'T'
- Bristol Boxkite
- Bristol B.R.7
- Bristol F.2 Fighter
- Bristol F.3A
- Bristol G.B.1
- Bristol Glider
- Bristol Gordon England
- Bristol M.1
- Bristol M.R.1 Metal Biplane
- Bristol P.B.8
- Bristol Prier monoplane
- Bristol Racing Biplane
- Bristol S.2A
- Bristol Scout A
- Bristol Scout B
- Bristol Scout E
- Bristol Scout F
- Bristol T.B.8
- Bristol Tramp
- Bristol T.T.A

=== Bristol ===
(Uriel Bristol, Sunny Isle, St Croix, Virgin Islands)

- Bristol BX-200

=== British Aerospace ===
(BAe, British Aerospace, United Kingdom)

- BAe 125
- BAe 146
- BAe 748
- BAe ATP
- BAe C-29
- BAe EAP
- BAe/McDonnell-Douglas Harrier
- BAe Hawk
- BAe Jetstream
- BAe Jetstream 41
- BAe Nimrod
- British Aerospace Nimrod AEW3
- BAe/McDonnell-Douglas T-45 Goshawk
- Avro RJ
- BAe CT-155 Hawk Canadian Armed Forces
- British Aerospace P.125
- British Aerospace HOTOL

=== British Aircraft Company ===
(BAC, British Aircraft Company, United Kingdom)

- BAC Planette
- BAC Drone
- BAC VIII Bat-Boat

=== British Aircraft Corporation ===
(BAC, British Aircraft Corporation, United Kingdom)

- Type 145 Lightning
- Type 166 Jet Provost
- Type 167 Strikemaster
- Type 221 Fairey Delta 2
- BAC Lightning
- BAC Jet Provost
- BAC VC-10
- BAC One-Eleven
- BAC Strikemaster
- BAC TSR-2
- BAC Two-Eleven and Three-Eleven
- Aérospatiale/BAC Concorde

=== British Aircraft Manufacturing ===
(BA, British Aircraft Manufacturing Company, United Kingdom)

- BA Cupid
- BA Double Eagle
- BA Eagle
- BA Swallow

=== British Deperdussin ===
(British Deperdussin Aeroplane Syndicate. / British Deperdussin Aeroplane Co., Ltd.)

- British Depurdussin Seagull

=== British Gyroplanes Ltd. ===
- BGL Tyro Gyro Mk 2

=== British Klemm ===
(British Klemm Aeroplane Company)

- British Klemm B.K. Swallow
- British Klemm B.K.1 Eagle
- British Klemm B.A.3 Cygnet

=== British Taylorcraft ===
(see Taylorcraft Aeroplanes (England) Limited)

=== Britten-Norman ===
- Britten-Norman Finibee
- Britten-Norman Islander
- Britten-Norman Defender
- Britten-Norman Trislander
- Britten-Norman Nymph
- Project Fresson

=== BRM Aero ===
- BRM Aero Bristell
- BRM Aero Bristell UL
- BRM Aero Bristell HD
- BRM Aero Bristell LSA
- BRM Aero Bristell RG

=== BRM Costruções Aeronáuticas ===
(Pero Pinheiro, Portugal)

- BRM Argos
- BRM Citius
- BRM Land Africa
- BRM Okavango

=== Brochet ===
(Avions Maurice Brochet / Constructions Aéronautiques Maurice Brochet)

- Brochet Beynes-CAU
- Brochet Brocheteau
- Brochet MB.20
- Brochet MB.30
- Brochet MB.40
- Brochet MB.50 Pipistrelle
- Brochet MB.60 Barbastrelle
- Brochet MB.70
- Brochet MB.71
- Brochet MB.72
- Brochet MB.73
- Brochet MB.76
- Brochet MB.80
- Brochet MB.81
- Brochet MB.83
- Brochet MB.84
- Brochet MB.100
- Brochet MB.101
- Brochet MB.110
- Brochet MB.120

=== Brock ===
( also Brock-Stinson - Walter L. Brock, Chicago, IL]]

- Brock 1919 biplane
- Brock Exhibition Monoplane
- Brock-Stinson
- Brock Loop Tractor

=== Brock ===
(Ken Brock Manufacturing Inc. Santa Ana, CA)

- Brock Avion
- Brock KB-1
- Brock KB-2 Freedom Machine
- Brock KB-3

=== Brodeau ===
(André Brodeau)

- Brodeau 7

=== Brodhead ===
(Arthur L. Brodhead, Miami, FL)

- Brodhead AS-1 Albee Sport

=== Brokaw-Jones ===
(Brokaw Aviation Inc (Dr Burgon F Brokaw & Ernest R Jones), Leesburg, FL)

- Brokaw-Jones BJ-520 Bullet

=== Bromon ===
(Bromon Aircraft Company)

- Bromon Br-2000

=== Brooklands Aerospace ===
- Brooklands Aerospace Firemaster 65

=== Broughton-Blaney ===
- Broughton-Blaney Brawny

=== Brown ===
(Louis H. Brown, Toledo, OH)

- Brown 1927 biplane

=== Brown ===
((Thoburn C. & William R.) Brown Metalplane Co, S 168 Post St, Spokane, WA)

- Brown Metalark I
- Brown Metalark II
- Brown Metalark II
- Brown Silver Streak

=== Brown ===
(aka Ben Brown - Benjamin Brown, Lawrence, KS)

- Brown SC
- Brown SC Diamond Wing

=== Brown ===
(C.L. Brown, Rushville MO.)

- Brown 1931 monoplane
- Brown 1935 monoplane
- Brown B

=== Brown ===
(H.F. Brown, Wichita, KS)

- Brown Special

=== Brown ===
(William Brown Jr., Fall Creek, WI)

- Brown 1931 monoplane

=== Brown ===
(Alden Brown, San Francisco, CA)

- Brown racer

=== Brown ===
(Benjamin Brown, Lawrence, KS)

- SC Diamond Wing

=== Brown ===
(Lawrence W Brown, Clover Field, Santa Monica, CA, 1931: Brown Aircraft Co, Montebello, CA)

- Brown 1926 parasol monoplane
- Brown 1927 monoplane
- Brown 1929 monoplane
- Brown B-1 Racer
- Brown B-2 Racer
- Brown B-3
- Brown B-3 Super Sport
- Brown Special (Mexico)
- Brown L-20 Brownie (possibly L-25)

=== Brown-Mercury ===
((Lawrence W) Brown-Mercury Aircraft Corp (with R T Leonard), 1172 E Slauson Ave, Los Angeles, CA)

- Brown-Mercury C-2
- Brown-Mercury C-3 Trimotor

=== Brown-Young ===
((Willis C) Brown-(Richard) Young; aka Columbia Aircraft Co, Tulsa, OK)

- Brown-Young BY-1
- Columbia BY-1

=== Browning ===
(J.B. Browning and Ben E. Cayler, Oceanside and Encinitas, CA)

- Browning C-1

=== Brubaker ===
(Wayne Chester Brubaker, Terre Hill, PA)

- Brubaker B-2

=== Bruggeman ===
(Clarence W Bruggeman, Norfolk, NE)

- Bruggeman Nini Bandido

=== Brügger ===
- Brügger MB-1 Colibri
- Brügger MB-2 Colibri 2
- Brügger MB-3
- Brügger Papillon

=== Brumby Aircraft Australia ===
- Brumby 600
- Brumby 610 Evolution
- Brumby Aircruiser

=== Brun-Cottan ===
- Brun-Cottan Patrol flying boat
- Brun-Cottan H.B.2 flying boat

=== Brunner-Winkle ===
((Joe & Harry) Brunner-(William E) Winkle Aircraft Corp, 17 Haverkamp St, Glendale, NY)

- Brunner-Winkle Bird A
- Brunner-Winkle Bird B

=== Brush ===
(Joseph Brush, Riverdale, NJ)

- Brush A

=== Brutsche Aircraft Corporation ===
(Salt Lake City, UT)

- Brutsche Freedom 40
- Brutsche Freedom 180 STOL
- Brutsche Freedom 210 STOL

=== Bryan ===
(Leland D. Bryan)

- Bryan Special
- Bryan Model I Autoplane
- Bryan Model II Autoplane
- Bryan Model III Autoplane
- Bryan Model IV Autoplane

=== Bryan-Laird ===
(J C Bryan & Charles Laird, Greer College, Greer Airways, 2024 S Wabash Ave, Chicago, IL)

- Bryan-Laird B-1B

=== Bryant ===
((Leland A) Bryant Aircraft Syndicate, Vail Field, Bell Gardens, CA)

- Bryant 1927 monoplane(Dole Race entrant, christened Angel of Los Angeles)

=== Brysacz ===
- Brysacz Model 2

=== Brzeski ===
(Henryk Brzeski)

- Brzeski Iskra

=== BSAS ===
(Braddick Specialised Air Services International (pty.) Ltd. P.O.Box 2189 M.E.C.C KZN 4301 South Africa)

- BSAS C-47-65ARTP Turbo Dakota
- BSAS C-47-67RTP Turbo Dakota
- BSAS C-47-67FTP Turbo Dakota

=== Bucciero ===
(Renato Bucciero)

- Bucciero SVIT

=== Buchanan ===
(Buchanan Aircraft Corporation, Queensland, Australia)

- Buchanan BAC-204 Ozzie Mozzie

=== Buchanan ===
(William O. Buchanan, Long Beach, CA)

- Buchanan Zipper

=== Buckenberg ===
(Clarence Rudolph Buckenberg, Larchwood, IA)

- Buckenberg 1932 monoplane

=== Bücker ===
(Bücker Flugzeugbau)

- Bücker Bü 131 Jungmann/KXBu Navy Experimental Type Bu Primary Trainer
- Bücker Bü 133 Jungmeister
- Bücker Bü 134
- Bücker Bü 180 Student
- Bücker Bü 181 Bestmann
- Bücker Bü 182 Kornett

=== Buckeye ===
(Buckeye Industries Inc of Argos, IN)

- Buckeye Dream Machine
- Buckeye Eagle
- Buckeye Eclipse
- Buckeye Endeavor
- Buckeye Falcon

=== Buckley ===
(Buckley Aircraft Co.)

- Buckley F-1
- Buckley LC-4

=== Budd ===
(Edward G Budd Mfg Co, Philadelphia, PA)

- Budd BB-1 Pioneer
- Budd RB Conestoga
- Budd C-93 Conestoga

=== Buecker ===
(Carl Buecker, Ft Wayne, IN)

- Buecker Skylark

=== Buethe ===
(W.B. Buethe Enterprise Inc)

- Buethe Barracuda

=== Buffington ===
Paul W. Buffington, Springfield, OH

- Buffington WE-3B Lady Jamy

=== Bugatti ===
- Bugatti Model 100

=== Buhl ===
- Buhl CA-1 Airster
- Buhl CA-3/CW-3 Airster
- Buhl Airsedan
- Buhl Junior Airsedan
- Buhl Sport Airsedan
- Buhl Senior Airsedan
- Buhl Bull Pup
- Buhl A-1 Autogiro

=== Bullock ===
(Walter Bullock)

- Bullock-Curtiss Little Looper
- Dallman Little Looper
- Bullock-Curtiss Pusher

=== Bulté ===
(Avions Bulté & Cie SA / René Bulté)

- Bulté RB.1
- Bulté RB.29
- Bulté RB.30 Sport

=== Bultzing-Slöwen ===
- Bultzing-Slöwen 1909 Biplane-Helicopter

=== Bunting ===
(John F. Bunting, Bothell, WA)

- Bunting A

=== Bunyard ===
(Kenneth L Bunyard, Westchester, NY, Bunyard Airplanes, Flushing, NY)

- Bunyard B-40
- Bunyard BAX-3 Sportsman
- Bunyard BAX-4 Sportsman

=== Burak ===
(Stanley Burak)

- Burak XF-4

=== Burgess ===
- Burgess Model A
- Burgess Model B
- Burgess Model C
- Burgess Model D
- Burgess Model E
- Burgess Model F
- Burgess Model G
- Burgess Model H
- Burgess Model I
- Burgess Model J
- Burgess Model U
- Burgess-Dunne Model H
- Burgess Type O Gunbus

=== Burgfalke ===
(Burgfalke-Flugzeugbau)

- Burgfalke M-150 Schulmeister

=== Burgoyne-Stirling ===
- Burgoyne-Stirling Dicer

=== Burke ===
(Burke Aircraft Co, 704 Townsend St, Chicago, IL)

- Burke Model 1

=== Burkholdt ===
(Fred & Sanford Burkholdt, Minneapolis, MN)

- Burkholdt 1927 monoplane

=== Burleson ===
- Burleson Rockford Twister

=== Burlingame ===
(Elmer A. Burlingame, Boston, MA)

- Burlingame Imp

=== Burnelli ===
(also see CCF & Continental)

- Burnelli A-1
- Burnelli CG-1
- Burnelli GX-3
- Burnelli OA-1
- Burnelli RB-1
- Burnelli RB-2
- Burnelli UB-14
- Burnelli CB-16
- Burnelli UB-20
- Uppercu-Burnelli CB-300
- Burnelli CBY-3 Loadmaster
- Uppercu-Burnelli UB-SS
- Remington-Burnelli Airliner
- Remington-Burnelli RB-1
- Remington-Burnelli RB-2
- Remington-Burnelli Transport
- Uppercu-Burnelli UB-14
- Uppercu-Burnelli UB-20
- Burnelli Wing
- Burnelli-Carisi Biplane
- Burnelli-Continental KB-1
- Burnelli-Continental KB-3
- Uppercu-Burnelli-Aeromarine-Klemm Model B

=== Burns ===
(Art Burns & J E "Brig" Young (Jung), Los Angeles, CA)

- Burns 1925 biplane

=== Burns ===
(Burns Aircraft Co., Starkville, MS)

- Burns BA-42

=== Burrell ===
(Leslie K. Burrell, Garden Grove, CA)

- Burrell Sport

=== Burrows ===
(Riley Burrows, Gardena and Glendale, CA)

- Burrows R-1
- Burrows R-4
- Burrows R-5

=== Burt ===
(Robert F. Burt, Pomona, CA)

- Burt RB-2 Special

=== Buscaylet-Béchereau ===
- Buscaylet-Béchereau C.1
- Buscaylet-Bechereau BB.2 (alternative designation for the C.1)

=== Buscaylet-de Monge ===
- Buscaylet-de Monge 5/1
- Buscaylet-de Monge 5/2
- Buscaylet-de Monge 7/4
- Buscaylet-de Monge 7/5

=== Bush ===
((C J) Bush Welding Works, 117 Greene St, Piqua, OH)

- Bush B-1

=== Bushby ===
(Bushby Aircraft Inc. - Robert W. Bushby)

- Bushby Midget Mustang
- Bushby Mustang II

=== Bushcaddy ===
(Bushcaddy Aircraft Canada, Lachute, Quebec, Canada)

- Bushcaddy R-80
- Bushcaddy R-120
- Bushcaddy L-160
- Bushcaddy L-162 Max
- Bushcaddy L-164

=== Bushey-McGrew ===
(Ralph Bushey & C F McGrew, Los Angeles, CA)

- ushey-McGrew B7M1 Bumblebee

=== Bushmaster ===
(Bushmaster Aircraft Corp.)

- Stout Bushmaster 2000

=== Bussen ===
(Eugene A. Bussen, Jefferson Barracks, MO)

- Bussen B-1

=== Butler ===
(C. Arthur Butler)

- Butler ABA-1
- Butler ABA-2 BAT

=== Butler ===
(Butler Co, 325 S Broadway St, Butler, IN)

- Butler Yellow Jacket

=== Butler ===
Butler Aircraft Corporation, division of Butler Manufacturing Corporation, Kansas City MO.

- Butler Blackhawk
- Butler Blackhawk Junior
- Butler Coach
- Butler Skyway
- Butler Leuthart

=== Butterfly ===
(Butterfly Aero, Oakville, WA)

- Butterfly Banty

=== The Butterfly LLC ===
- The Butterfly The Ultralight Butterfly
- The Butterfly Super Sky Cycle
- The Butterfly The Aurora Butterfly
- The Butterfly The Golden Butterfly
- The Butterfly The Turbo Golden Butterfly
- The Butterfly The Emperor Butterfly
- The Butterfly The Monarch Butterfly

=== Butters ===
(William A. Butters & Associates, Johnstown, PA)

- Butters 1930 monoplane

=== Butterworth ===
(G.N. Butterworth, West Kingston, RI)

- Butterworth Westland Whirlwind II

=== Büttner Propeller ===
(Gerald Büttner - Obernkirchen, Obernkirchen, Germany)

- Büttner Crazy Flyer
- Büttner Crazy Plane
- Büttner Easy Plane

=== Butz ===
- Butz F-1

=== Buxton ===
(Jay Buxton, Hawthorne, CA)

- Buxton B-4-A

=== Buzzard ===
SEE Snyder

=== Buzzman ===
(Buzzman ARVS / L'il Hustler Ultralight Aviation)

- Buzzman L'il Buzzard
- Buzzman L'il Buzzard TWS 582
- Buzzman L'il Hustler
- Buzzman L'il Hustler SS
- Buzzman L'il Hustler TR

=== Bye Aerospace ===
(Denver, Colorado, United States)

- Bye Aerospace Sun Flyer 2
- Bye Aerospace Sun Flyer 4

=== Bylinkin ===
(Fedor Ivanovich Bylinkin)

- Bylinkin 1910 monoplane

=== Byron ===
(Charles Byron, East Brunswick, NJ)

- Byroncraft A1
