= Type 42 =

Type 42 may refer to:

- Bristol Type 42 Grampus II, British prototype biplane passenger aircraft
- Peugeot Type 42, motor vehicle by the French auto-maker Peugeot
- Type 42 destroyer, light guided missile destroyers used by the Royal Navy and the Argentine Navy
- Type 42, a font format, see PostScript fonts#Type 42
