= SNCASE SE-400 =

SE-400

General information
- Type: Coastal reconnaissance floatplane
- National origin: France
- Manufacturer: SNCASE
- Status: Prototype
- Number built: 1

History
- First flight: 31 December 1939

The SNCASE SE-400 was a prototype French twin-engined coastal patrol floatplane of the Second World War. A single example was flown, but development was abandoned in May 1940 owing to the German invasion of France.

== Design and development ==
In 1937 the French Air Ministry issued specification A46 for a three-seat coastal reconnaissance seaplane to replace the obsolete CAMS 37 biplane flying boats of the French Navy. To meet this requirement, the Société Nationale des Constructions Aéronautiques du Sud-Est (SNCASE) designed a twin-engined monoplane floatplane, the SE-400, work beginning on construction of two prototypes in March 1938.

The SE.400 was of mixed construction, with a steel tube fuselage and wooden wings. It had a twin tail and was powered by two 655 hp (489 kW) Gnome-Rhône 14M radial engines. The aircraft's undercarriage consisted of two light alloy floats mounted beneath the engines.

== Operational history ==
The first prototype, the SE.400-01 made its maiden flight from Marignane on 31 December 1939. Flight testing showed that the SE-400 suffered from stability problems, and the aircraft had a new, larger, tail assembly fitted and its nose lengthened. These modifications resolved the aircraft's handling problems, but by this time the competing Breguet Nautilus had been ordered into production.

The war situation and the continuing delays in the program resulted in the development of the SE-400 being abandoned on 24 May 1940, with the second prototype, a landplane powered by two 500 hp (370 kW) Lorraine 9N Algol engines, (Note: 600 hp (450 kW) Pratt & Whitney Wasp S3H1-G engines were another proposed alternative.) left incomplete. The first prototype was found by Italian troops at Vitrolles, but while the aircraft's engines and propellers were removed, the rest of the aircraft remained intact until 1945.

== Operators ==
France

- French Navy

== Specifications ==
Data from War Planes of the Second World War

General characteristics

- Crew: 3
- Length: 13.50 m (44 ft 3 in)
- Wingspan: 19.35 m (63 ft 6 in)
- Height: 4.50 m (14 ft 9 in)
- Wing area: 52.00 m^{2} (559.7 sq ft)
- Gross weight: 5,500 kg (12,125 lb)
- Powerplant: 2 × Gnome-Rhône 14M 8/9 14-cylinder air-cooled radial engines, 488 kW (655 hp) each

Performance

- Maximum speed: 290 km/h (180 mph, 160 kn) at 2,000 m (6,560 ft)
- Cruise speed: 159 km/h (99 mph, 86 kn) (econ cruise)
- Range: 958 km (595 mi, 517 nmi) at 159 km/h (99 mph)
- Endurance: 6 hr
- Service ceiling: 4,000 m (13,120 ft)

Armament

- Guns: 1× 7.5 mm Darne machine gun at dorsal position
- Bombs: 2× 75 kg (165 lb) bombs and 2× flares

== See also ==
Aircraft of comparable role, configuration, and era

- Breguet Nautilus

Related lists

- List of flying boats and floatplanes
