= Bristol F.3A =

1910s British fighter aircraft design

F.3A

General information
- Type: Three-seat anti-Zeppelin fighter
- National origin: United Kingdom
- Manufacturer: British & Colonial Aeroplane Co
- Status: Cancelled
- Number built: None

History
- Developed from: Bristol T.T.A.

The Bristol F.3A was a British three-seat, single-engined biplane designed by the British & Colonial Aeroplane Co in 1916 as an anti-Zeppelin fighter. Two prototypes were ordered for the Royal Flying Corps but were not completed and the project was cancelled. In 1923 the type was retrospectively designated the Type 7.

== Development ==
The company was invited to bid for the production of two prototype escort and anti-Zeppelin fighters, using two 250 hp Rolls-Royce engines made available by the Admiralty. The design was based on the company's twin-engined local defence fighter, the T.T.A., and was required to have a patrol endurance of seven hours. The company received an order on 16 May 1916 to build two prototypes for the Royal Flying Corps. The type used many TTA components including the wings, rear fuselage and tail unit. The two gunners were each accommodated in a nacelle on the top wing with a forward- and rearward-firing machine gun.

With the availability of aircraft with synchronising guns the programme was cancelled and the two aircraft were not built.

== Specifications ==
Data from

General characteristics

- Crew: 3 (pilot and two gunners)
- Length: 36 ft 5 in (11.10 m)
- Wingspan: 53 ft 6 in (16.31 m)
- Height: 12 ft 11 in (3.94 m)
- Wing area: 817 sq ft (75.9 m^{2})
- Empty weight: 3,400 lb (1,542 kg)
- Gross weight: 5,300 lb (2,404 kg)
- Powerplant: 1 × Rolls-Royce 250hp V-12 water-cooled piston engine, 250 hp (190 kW)
