= Breguet 890 Mercure =

Mercure / Mars

General information
- Type: Freighter and airliner
- National origin: France
- Manufacturer: Breguet Aviation
- Number built: 3

History
- First flight: 1 March 1949

The Breguet 890 Mercure was a late 1940s French cargo and passenger transport aircraft designed by Breguet Aviation. Three variants were produced including a military variant called the Mars but none entered production.

== Design and development ==
With a French Air Force requirement to replace the Douglas C-47 and Amiot AAC-1 Breguet started development of the Breguet 890 as a medium-capacity military transport. The commercial transport prototype designated the Breguet 890H Mercure was an all-metal cantilever high-wing monoplane powered by two 2,000 hp (1,491 kW) Bristol Hercules radial engines. It had a retractable tricycle landing gear and, advanced for its day, a swing tail to allow access (using a loading ramp) into the fuselage for heavy equipment and vehicles. A military prototype was also built under the designation Breguet 891R Mars, it retained the swing tail but had provision for 20 paratroopers and was powered by two 1,600 hp (1,193 kW) Gnome-Rhône 14R-200 radial engines. The Mars had parachute doors on each side of the fuselage, a floor chute for dropping containers and also a towing hook for a glider.

The third variant and the first to fly on 1 March 1949 was a convertible passenger/cargo aircraft, designated the Breguet 892S Mercure. Although based on the 890H the 892S had four 500 hp (373 kW) Renault 12S inline piston engines. It had a large cargo door on the starboard side and two passenger doors in the port side. When fitted with seats it could carry 40 passengers.

Only one prototype of each variant was built, the French Air Force ordered the Nord Noratlas rather than the Mars and with the availability of war-surplus aircraft like the Douglas DC-3 available to commercial operators the type did not enter production.

== Variants ==
890H Mercure
Twin-engined freighter/commercial transport prototype powered by two 2,000 hp (1,491 kW) Bristol Hercules radial engines, one built, first flown in April 1950. Later the 892S variant was modified to the 890H standard.
890J Mercure
Prototype commercial transport was originally to be powered by two Jumo 211 but with the availability of the British Hercules engine the designation was changed to 890H.
891R Mars
Twin-engined military freighter variant of the 890H powered by two 1,600 hp (1,193 kW) Gnome-Rhône 14R-200 radial engines, one built, first flown in November 1949.
892S Mercure
Four-engined convertible cargo/passenger variant with four 500 hp (373 kW) Renault 12S inline piston engines, one built, first flown in March 1949. The 892S was later converted to be the second 890H.
893S
Unbuilt variant that would have used Bristol Hercules engines.
894
Unbuilt variant that would have used Pratt & Whitney R-2800 engines.
895H
A larger variant was proposed in 1953 but not built.

== Specifications 892S Mercure ==
Data from Illustrated Encyclopedia of Aircraft

General characteristics

- Length: 21.60 m (70 ft 10 in)
- Wingspan: 30.60 m (100 ft 5 in)
- Height: 7.20 m (23 ft 7 in)
- Wing area: 101.20 m^{2} (1,089.3 sq ft)
- Empty weight: 800 kg (1,764 lb)
- Max takeoff weight: 16,000 kg (35,274 lb)
- Powerplant: 4 × Renault 12S inline piston engine, 370 kW (500 hp) each

Performance

- Maximum speed: 350 km/h (220 mph, 190 kn) at 2500m
- Cruise speed: 285 km/h (177 mph, 154 kn) at 1500m
- Range: 1,000 km (620 mi, 540 nmi)
