= Bréguet 500 Colmar =

French airliner with 2 piston engines, 1945

Colmar

General information
- Type: Airliner
- National origin: France
- Manufacturer: Bréguet Aviation
- Primary user: French Air Force
- Number built: 1

History
- First flight: 27 February 1945
- Retired: October 1947

The Bréguet 500 Colmar was a 1940s French airliner designed by Bréguet Aviation. Two prototypes were built during the Second World War but only one survived to fly in 1945. The prototype went on to operate as a VIP transport with the French Air Force but no others were built.

== Design and development ==
Originally started under the designation 483T, the Colmar was designed as a twin-engined airliner or VIP and staff transport, based on the earlier four-engined Bréguet 482 bomber. It was an all-metal mid-wing cantilever monoplane with twin fins and rudders and retractable tailwheel landing gear. The fuselage cabin was divided into two due to the main spar, up to six passengers in the forward cabin and 17 in the rear. Work started at Montaudran on two prototypes during the German occupation which were given the designation Bréguet 500 Colmar. In April 1944 one of the almost completed prototypes was destroyed by the Royal Air Force during a bombing raid on the factory.

Following the liberation of France, the surviving prototype, powered by two Gnome-Rhône 14R-04 / Gnome-Rhône 14R-05 radial engines, first flew on 27 February 1945. Plans to put the type into production as the Bréguet 510 Colmar were abandoned, and, after testing, the sole Colmar was delivered to the French Air Force for use as a VIP transport. The Colmar was withdrawn from service in October 1947 and scrapped.

== Operators ==
France

- French Air Force

== Variants ==
500 Colmar
Twin-engined airliner prototype, one built and one destroyed before completion.
510 Colmar
Proposed production variant with longer fuselage, not built.

== Specifications (500 Colmar) ==
Data from Illustrated Encyclopedia of Aircraft

General characteristics

- Capacity: 23
- Length: 19.95 m (65 ft 5 in)
- Wingspan: 24.10 m (79 ft 1 in)
- Height: 4.80 m (15 ft 9 in)
- Wing area: 66.70 m^{2} (718.0 sq ft)
- Max takeoff weight: 14,380 kg (31,702 lb)
- Powerplant: 2 × Gnome-Rhône 14R-04 / Gnome-Rhône 14R-05 radial piston engine, 1,200 kW (1,600 hp) each

Performance

- Cruise speed: 400 km/h (250 mph, 220 kn) approx
- Range: 2,000 km (1,200 mi, 1,100 nmi)

== Bibliography ==
- Chillon, Jacques; Dubois, Jean-Pierre & Wegg, John (1980). French Post-War Transport Aircraft. Tonbridge, UK: Air-Britain. ISBN 0-85130-078-2.
- Cuny, Jean & Leyvastre, Pierre (1977). Les Avions Breguet (1940/1971). DOCAVIA (in French). Vol. 6. Paris: Editions Larivière. OCLC 440863702.
- Lacaze, Henri (2016). Les avions Louis Breguet Paris [The Aircraft of Louis Breguet, Paris: The Reign of the Monoplane] (in French). Vol. 2: le règne du monoplan. Le Vigen, France. ISBN 978-2-914017-89-3.
- The Illustrated Encyclopedia of Aircraft (Part Work 1982-1985). Orbis Publishing.
