= Breda A.7 =

Reconnaissance aircraft developed in Italy

A.7
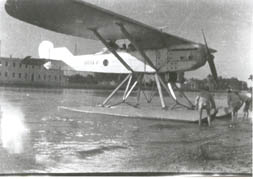

General information
- Type: Reconnaissance aircraft
- Manufacturer: Breda
- Primary user: Regia Aeronautica
- Number built: 14, plus 1 A.16

History
- Introduction date: 1929

The Breda A.7 was a reconnaissance aircraft developed in Italy for use by the Regia Aeronautica in 1929. It was a braced parasol monoplane of conventional configuration with tailskid undercarriage. The pilot and observer sat in tandem, open cockpits. A single prototype of a long-range example, originally designated A.7 Raid and later A.16 (or Ba.16) was also constructed, but the air force showed no interest in it.

== Variants ==
A.7LD
Two prototypes, powered by 298 kW (400 hp) Lorraine-Dietrich piston engines. (2 built).
A.7
Production version. Two-seat reconnaissance aircraft, powered by a 380 kW (510 hp) Isotta Fraschini Asso 500 piston engine, and fitted with a revised cooling system and empennage; 12 built.
A.7 Raid (later A.16 or Ba.16)
A long-range version, powered by a 370 kW (500 hp) Isotta Fraschini Asso 500 AQ engine. Engine later changed to a Bristol Jupiter VII and an extra seat added.
A.7Idro
Seaplane fitted with twin floats.

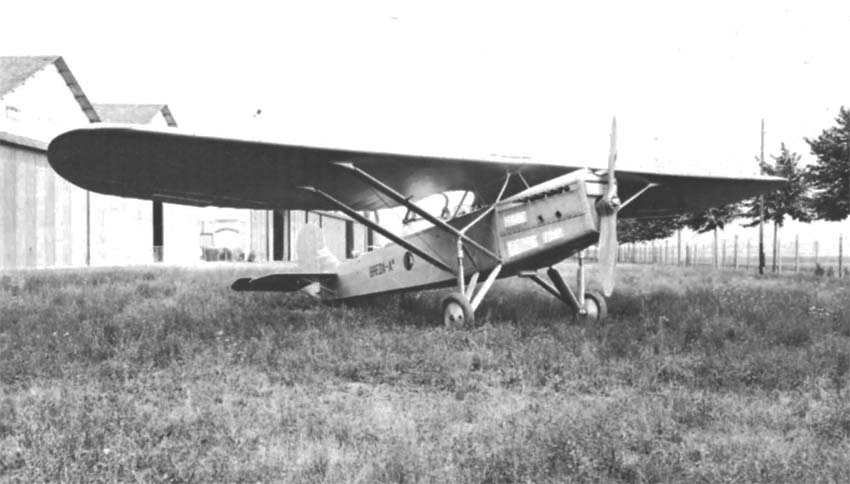
The sole Breda Ba.16

Ba.16
a long-range version; one built.

== Operators ==
Kingdom of Italy

- Regia Aeronautica

== Specifications (A.7) ==
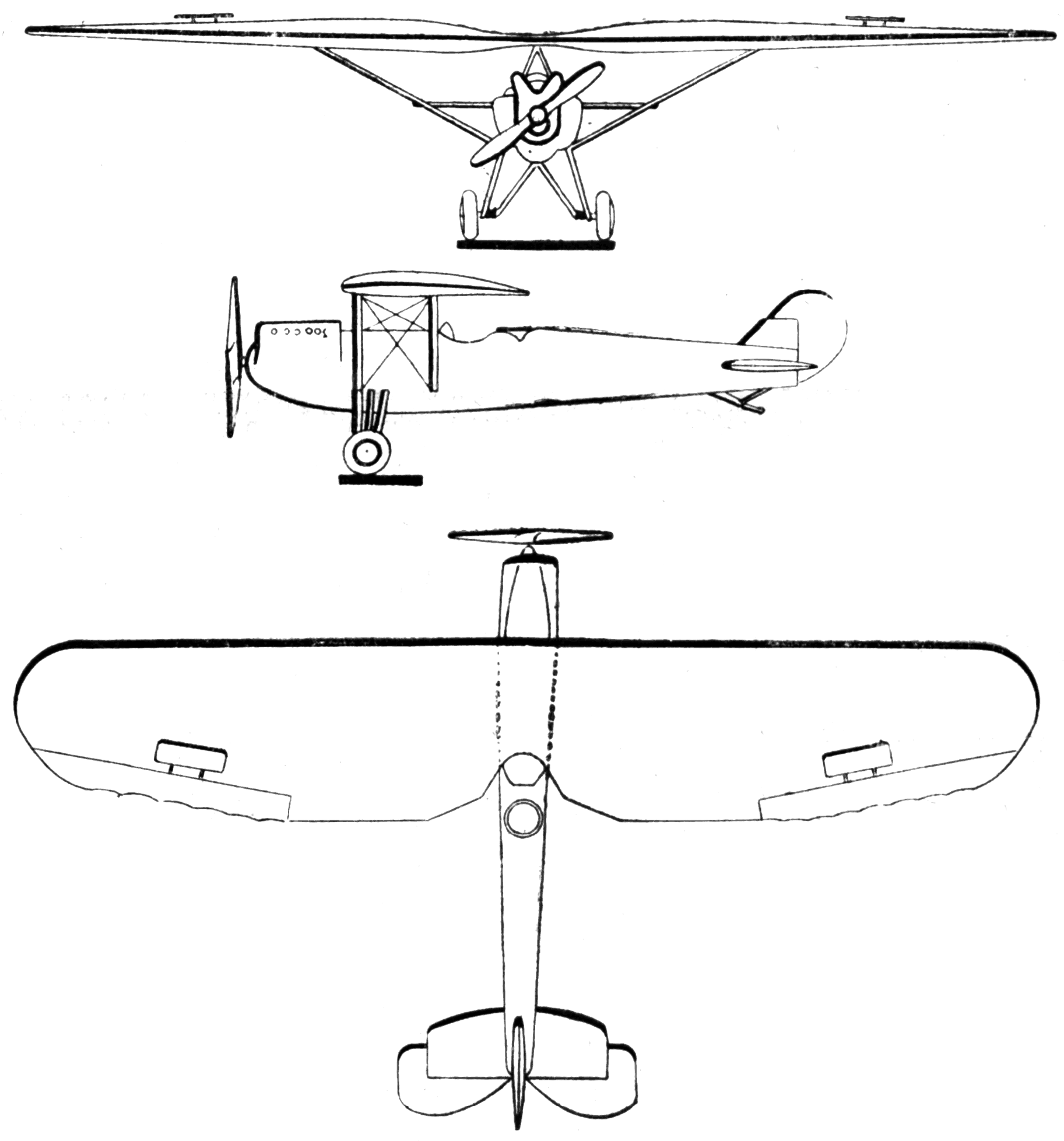
Breda A.7 3-view drawing from Les Ailes April 21,1927

Data from Jane's all the World's Aircraft 1928

General characteristics

- Crew: 2
- Length: 10.515 m (34 ft 6 in)
- Wingspan: 15.78 m (51 ft 9 in)
- Height: 3.15 m (10 ft 4 in)
- Wing area: 43 m^{2} (460 sq ft)
- Empty weight: 1,500 kg (3,307 lb)
- Gross weight: 2,500 kg (5,512 lb)
- Powerplant: 1 × Isotta Fraschini Asso 500 V-12 water-cooled piston engine, 370 kW (500 hp)
- Propellers: 2-bladed fixed pitch wooden propeller

Performance

- Maximum speed: 235 km/h (146 mph, 127 kn)
- Stall speed: 75 km/h (47 mph, 40 kn)
- Range: 1,200 km (750 mi, 650 nmi)
- Endurance: 6 hours
- Service ceiling: 6,500 m (21,300 ft)
- Rate of climb: 4.6 m/s (910 ft/min)
- Wing loading: 58 kg/m^{2} (12 lb/sq ft)
- Power/mass: 0.150 kW/kg (0.091 hp/lb)

Armament

- Guns: 1x 7.7 mm (0.303 in) fixed synchronised forward-firing Darne cal. 7,7 machine gun plus 1× 7.7 mm (0.303 in) Lewis Gun on a flexible mount for the observer
- Bombs: max. 72x 2 kg bomblets

== See also ==
Related lists

- List of Interwar military aircraft
