= Bulté RB.1 =

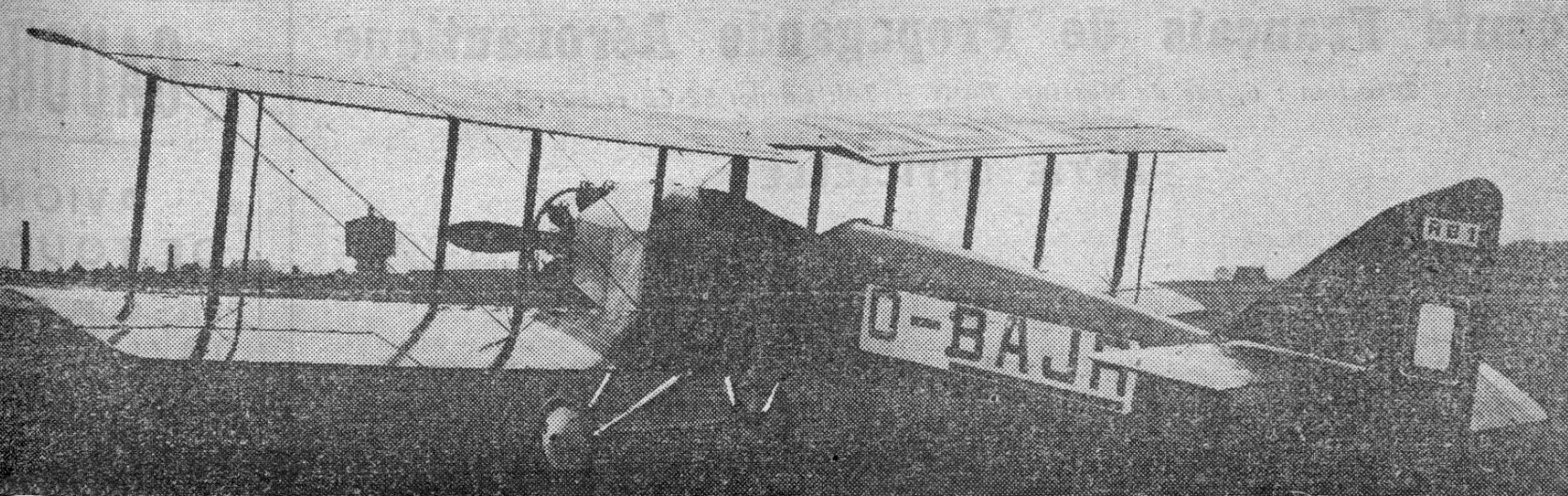

General information
- Type: Training and touring aircraft
- National origin: Belgium
- Manufacturer: Avions Bulté & Cie SA
- Designer: René Bulté
- Number built: 5

History
- First flight: late 1928

The Bulté RB.1 was a Belgian training and touring biplane first flown in 1928. Five examples flew with clubs and with private owners in contests and rallies.

== Design and development ==
Until June 1928 Renée Bulté had been head of design with Ateliers de Construction Aéronautique de Zeebruges, usually known as ZACCO and one of the pioneers of all-metal aircraft manufacture. He left them to found his own company, Avions Bulté & Cie. Its first product, the RB.1 tandem seat training aircraft, flew towards the end of the year.

The RB.1 was a simple, conventional, two-bay biplane with thin-section, equal span wings mounted without stagger. One feature of the design was the interchangeability of components; as an example, the wing panels were identical. Such interchangeability reduced the stocks of spares required. The lower wings were attached to the lower fuselage structure and the upper ones to a fuselage-wide centre section held well above the fuselage by four upright cabane struts from the upper fuselage. Both upper and lower wing-sets were mounted with 3° of dihedral and were braced together with two pairs of identical, parallel interplane struts on each side, assisted by the usual wire cross-bracing. Both had short, broad-chord ailerons which reached the wingtips and were externally interconnected. Structurally, each wing was built around two spruce spars and had plywood-covered leading edges.

The trainer was powered by an 89 kW (120 hp) Anzani 6 six-cylinder radial engine in the nose, fitted with a narrow-chord ring cowling. Immediately behind the engine the fuselage was five-sided, rectangular below but sloping on top, and was covered with aluminium sheets back to the wing leading edge. This region contained both fuel and oil tanks. Behind it, the fuselage was formed around four wooden longerons, ash to the rear of the cockpit and spruce further aft. The ash-framed part had three-ply covered sides and a thin aluminium underside and the rear fuselage was canvas covered, including domed rear decking.

Normally the instructor and student sat one behind the other in a long, single, open cockpit, equipped with dual control. The front seat was under the wing but the rear one was behind the trailing edge, which had a rectangular cut-out for better upward vision. Alternatively, the seats could be arranged tightly side-by-side, though with slight stagger, which allowed single controls to be shared and eased communication.

The RB.1's empennage was conventional, with a broad-chord, rectangular plan tailplane mounted on top of the fuselage and carrying elevators with a large central cut-out for rudder movement. Its triangular fin mounted a parallelogram profile rudder which reached down to the keel.

It had conventional, fixed landing gear, with its mainwheels on a single axle and a wide track of about 2 m (79 in). The axle was joined through rubber cord shock absorbers to a fixed pair of transverse steel tubes supported by a pair of steel V-struts mounted on the lower fuselage longerons. Its tailskid was externally mounted on a little steel tube pyramid, with a knee-type rubber cord shock absorber.

== Operational history ==
The Bulté RB.1 first flew towards the end of 1928, though the exact date is not known. Five appeared on the Belgian civil aircraft register between 1929 and 1931.

One took part in the Tour du France des Avions de Tourisme around France in May 1931 and another in the Auvergne rally in July that year.

In the UK sales efforts were handled by Sealandair but no examples were registered.

== Specifications (RB.1) ==
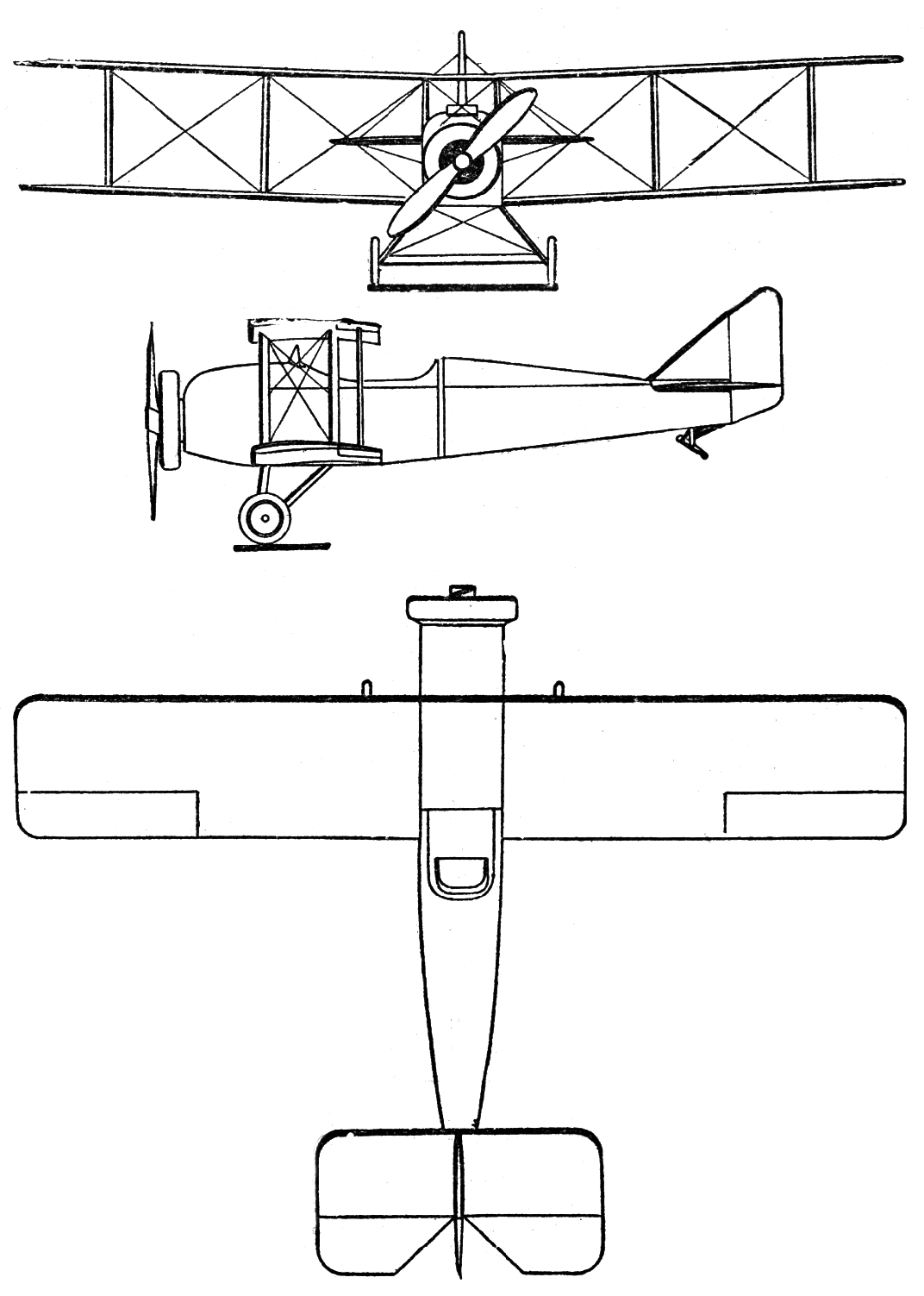
Bulté RB.1 3-view drawing from Les Ailes November 8, 1928

Data from Les Ailes, November 1928

General characteristics

- Crew: Two
- Length: 7.84 m (25 ft 9 in)
- Wingspan: 10.88 m (35 ft 8 in)
- Height: 2.71 m (8 ft 11 in)
- Wing area: 32.90 m^{2} (354.1 sq ft)
- Aspect ratio: 6.88
- Empty weight: 560 kg (1,235 lb)
- Gross weight: 840 kg (1,852 lb)
- Powerplant: 1 × Anzani 6 6-cylinder radial, 89 kW (120 hp)
- Propellers: 2-bladed

Performance

- Maximum speed: 125 km/h (78 mph, 67 kn) at ground level
- Stall speed: 55 km/h (34 mph, 30 kn) minimum speed
- Range: 600 km (370 mi, 320 nmi)
- Service ceiling: 4,200 m (13,800 ft) absolute
- Wing loading: 25.5 kg/m^{2} (5.2 lb/sq ft)
