= Breda A.1 =

Touring aircraft developed in Italy in 1924

General information
- Type: Sports plane
- Manufacturer: Breda

History
- First flight: 1924

The Breda A.1 was a touring aircraft developed in Italy in 1924.

== Design ==
The Breda A.1 was a conventional two-seat, single engine biplane with a fixed bogie. The Colombo 110 engine was positioned at the front apex of the fuselage combined with a two-blade wooden propeller with fixed pitch.

The A.1 was intended for the civil aviation tourism market, and several aircraft of this type were constructed.

== Specifications ==
Data from Airwar:Breda A.1

General characteristics

- Crew: 2
- Length: 9.0 m (29 ft 6 in)
- Wingspan: 10.2 m (33 ft 6 in)
- Height: 3.2 m (10 ft 6 in)
- Wing area: 43.0 m^{2} (463 sq ft)
- Empty weight: 860 kg (1,896 lb)
- Gross weight: 1,100 kg (2,425 lb)
- Powerplant: 1 × Colombo E.150 6-cylinder water-cooled inline piston engine, 100 kW (140 hp)
- Propellers: 2-bladed fixed-pitch propeller

Performance

- Maximum speed: 138 km/h (86 mph, 75 kn)
- Cruise speed: 110 km/h (68 mph, 59 kn)
- Service ceiling: 3,000 m (9,800 ft)
