= Brügger Colibri =

Colibri
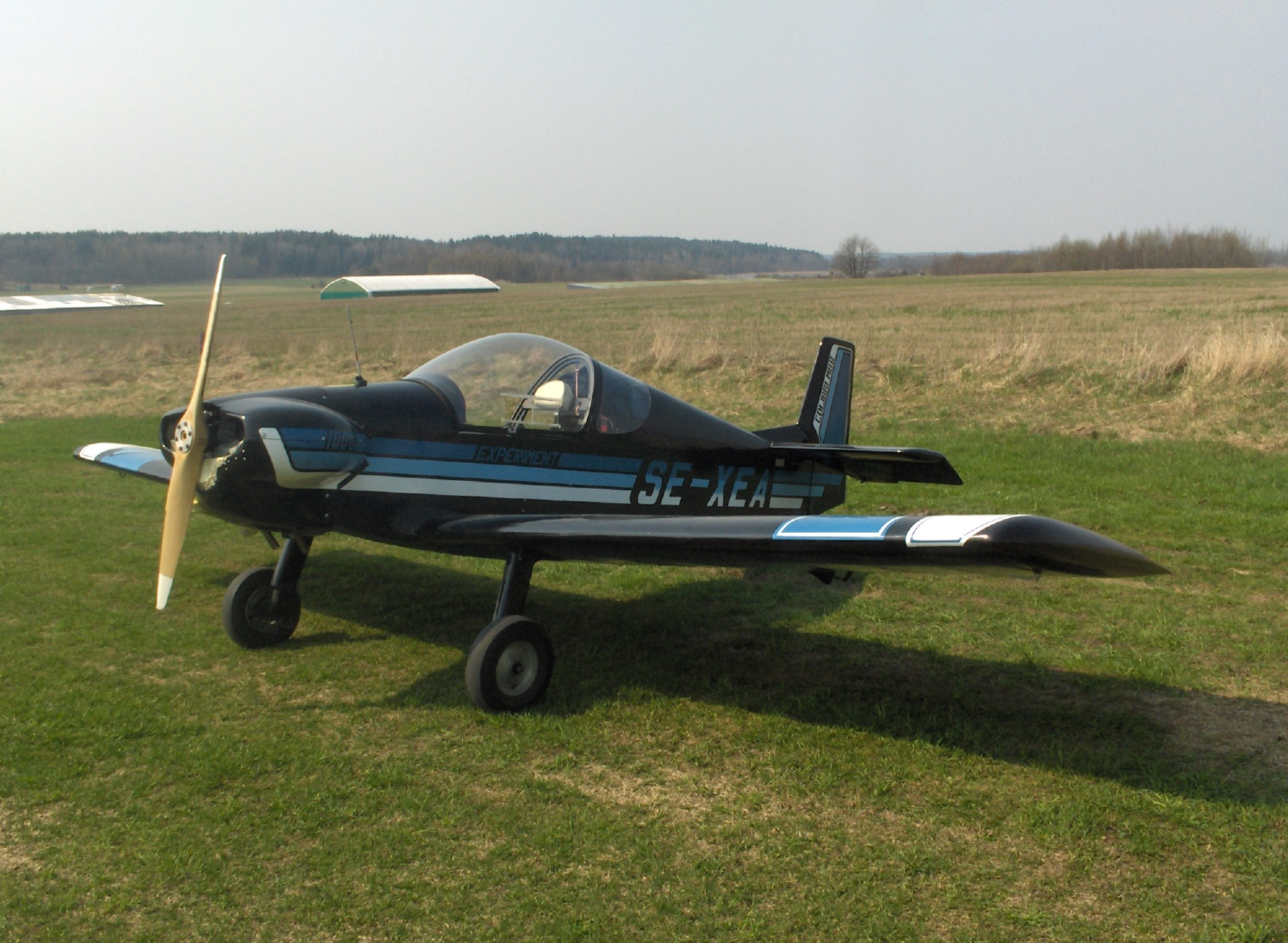
- MB-2 at Vängsö ESSZ in Sweden in 2006

General information
- Type: Sports plane
- National origin: Switzerland
- Designer: Max Brügger
- Number built: 260+

History
- First flight: 1965

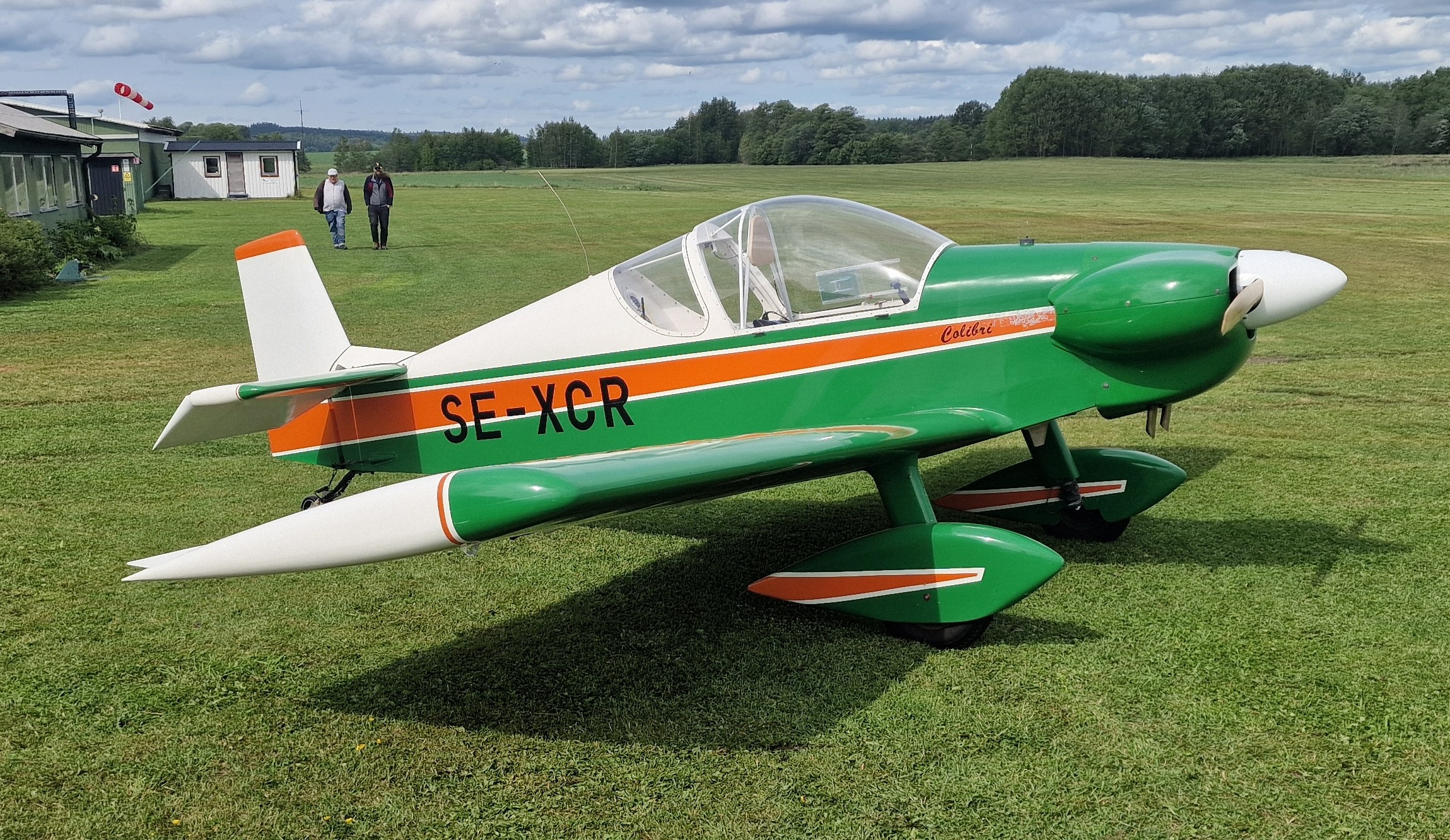
Alingsås June 2025, SE-XCR Sweden Brügger Colibri MB2

The Brügger MB-1, MB-2 and MB-3 Colibri is a family of small sports aircraft designed in Switzerland in the 1960s and 1970s for amateur construction.

== Design and development ==
The Colibri family are single-seat, low-wing cantilever monoplanes with fixed tailwheel undercarriage powered by a four-cylinder horizontally opposed Volkswagen air-cooled engine automotive conversion.

The MB-1 Colibri first flew in 1965 and served as a development aircraft for the definitive MB-2 Colibri 2 that flew in 1970. These aircraft had all-wooden framework with fabric-covered wings and plywood-covered fuselages. The pilot's seat was enclosed by an expansive bubble canopy. In 1976-77, Brügger built and flew an all-metal version as the MB-3. Many examples are actively flying in 2012.

The MB-2 is noted for its handling qualities.

== Specifications (MB-2) ==
Data from Jane's All the World's Aircraft 1976–77

General characteristics

- Crew: 1
- Length: 4.80 m (15 ft 9 in)
- Wingspan: 6.00 m (19 ft 8 in)
- Height: 1.60 m (5 ft 3 in)
- Wing area: 8.20 m^{2} (88.3 sq ft)
- Airfoil: NACA 23012
- Empty weight: 215 kg (474 lb)
- Max takeoff weight: 330 kg (728 lb)
- Fuel capacity: 33 L (7.3 imp gal; 8.7 US gal)
- Powerplant: 1 × Volkswagen air-cooled engine (1600 cc), 30 kW (40 hp)
- Propellers: 2-bladed Brügger fixed-pitch propeller

Performance

- Maximum speed: 220 km/h (138 mph, 120 kn) at 4,000 m (13,000 ft)
- Cruise speed: 160 km/h (99 mph, 86 kn) at 4,000 m (13,000 ft) (econ. cruise, 75% power)
- Stall speed: 60 km/h (37 mph, 32 kn)
- Range: 500 km (310 mi, 270 nmi)
- Service ceiling: 4,500 m (14,800 ft)
- Rate of climb: 3.0 m/s (590 ft/min)
- Takeoff and landing run: 200 m (660 ft)
