= Buethe Barracuda =

Barracuda

General information
- Type: Homebuilt cabin monoplane
- National origin: United States
- Manufacturer: W.B. Buethe Enterprises
- Designer: William Buethe

History
- First flight: 29 June 1975

The Buethe Barracuda is an American two-seat cabin monoplane designed by William Buethe and sold as plans or kits for amateur construction.

== Design and development ==
The prototype Barracuda first flew on 29 June 1975, it is an all-wood, low-wing monoplane with a retractable tricycle landing gear. The enclosed cabin has side-by-side configuration seating for two with dual controls. The prototype was powered by a 250 hp (186 kW) Lycoming IO-540-C4B5 engine but it was designed to take engines between 150 and 300 hp (112-234 kW).

== Specifications (Prototype) ==
Data from Jane's All the World's Aircraft 1989-90

General characteristics

- Crew: 2
- Length: 21 ft 5 in (6.55 m)
- Wingspan: 21 ft 9 in (7.54 m)
- Wing area: 120.0 sq ft (11.15 m^{2})
- Empty weight: 1,570 lb (712 kg)
- Gross weight: 2,300 lb (1,043 kg)
- Powerplant: 1 × Lycoming IO-540-C4B5 , 250 hp (186 kW)

Performance

- Maximum speed: 208 mph (335 km/h, 181 kn)
- Cruise speed: 187 mph (300 km/h, 162 kn)
- Stall speed: 64 mph (103 km/h, 56 kn)
- Range: 920 mi (1,480 km, 800 nmi)
- Rate of climb: 2,500 ft/min (13 m/s)
