= Bryan Autoplane =

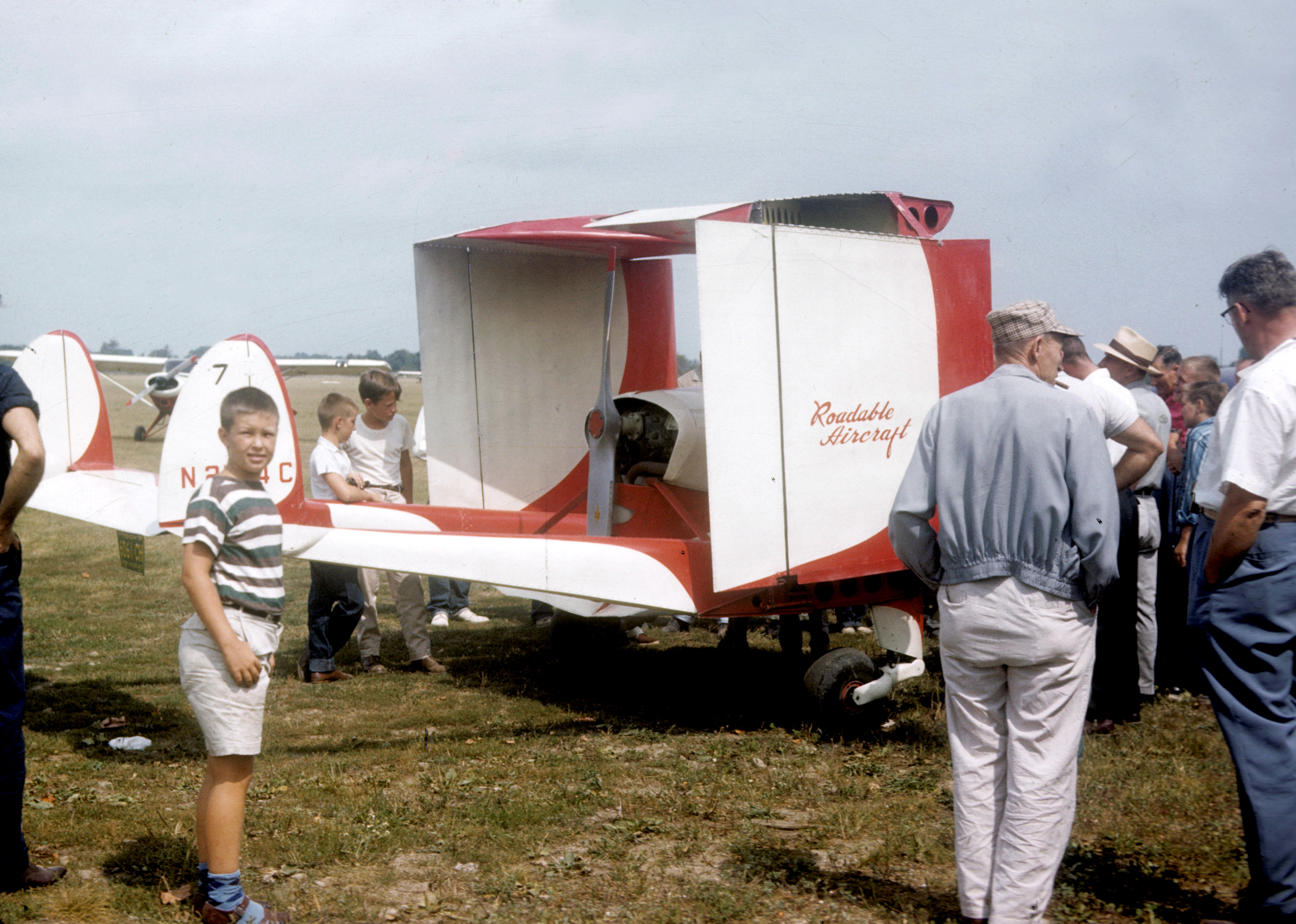
- Bryan Model II at Maule Field in Napoleon, Michigan

General information
- Type: Roadable aircraft
- National origin: United States
- Designer: Leland Bryan
- Number built: 2

History
- First flight: 1953

The Bryan Autoplanes were a series of three experimental roadable aircraft.

== Development ==
Leland Bryan built his roadable aircraft in the town of Milford, Michigan. As a roadable aircraft the aircraft was required to be registered by both the Civil Aeronautics Administration (CAA) and the Michigan Motor Vehicle Administration (MMVA), with road propulsion provided by propeller thrust.

== Design ==
The Bryan Model I was built with a welded steel tube fuselage frame, wings from a Briegleb BG-6 primary glider and a Crosley automobile engine, which was later replaced by a 40 hp Continental.

The Model II autoplane featured an extended Erco Ercoupe center-section, with a pusher engine at the rear of the fuselage nacelle, with twin tail booms supporting the tail section. The Ercoupe landing gear was used for the roadable operations, reaching up to 60 mph on the road. For storage and road transport the wings folded at two hinge lines.

== Operational history ==
The Model I was approved for limited flight, in the experimental category by the CAA, managing to accumulate 500 miles of road driving, and flying for the first time in 1953. The improved Model II achieved 80 hours of flight time and 4000 miles of road travel before a road accident. During repairs the Model II was rebuilt with two-seats becoming the Model III Autoplane, with a Continental A75 engine and convertible top motors, from a Chevrolet Corvair, to extend and fold the wings. After accumulating 70 hours of flight time and 1000 road miles, the Model III crashed during a flyby at the 1974 Experimental Aircraft Association (EAA) airshow, at Oshkosh, Wisconsin, when an inadequately secured wing section parted company killing the designer. At the time of his death Leland Bryan was in the process of designing the Model IV Autoplane, based on a Rutan VariViggen.

== Variants ==
Bryan Special
Alternative name for the Bryan Model I
Bryan Model I Autoplane
entered flight test in 1953
Bryan Model II Autoplane
1957 based on an Ercoupe fuselage with a double articulating wing.
Bryan Model III Autoplane
1970 a rebuild of the model II with single hinged wing articulation.
Bryan Model IV Autoplane

== Specifications (Model II) ==
Data from Sport Aviation September 1957

General characteristics

- Crew: 1
- Wingspan: 22 ft 6 in (6.86 m)
- Width: 8 ft (2.4 m) Wings Folded
- Height: 7 ft 10 in (2.39 m) Wings Folded
- Empty weight: 720 lb (327 kg)
- Powerplant: 1 × Continental A75 4-cyl. air-cooled horizontally-opposed piston engine, 75 hp (56 kW)

Performance

- Maximum speed: 91 kn (105 mph, 169 km/h)
- Cruise speed: 78 kn (90 mph, 140 km/h)
- Stall speed: 48 kn (55 mph, 89 km/h)
- Rate of climb: 500 ft/min (2.5 m/s)
