= Buzzman L'il Buzzard =

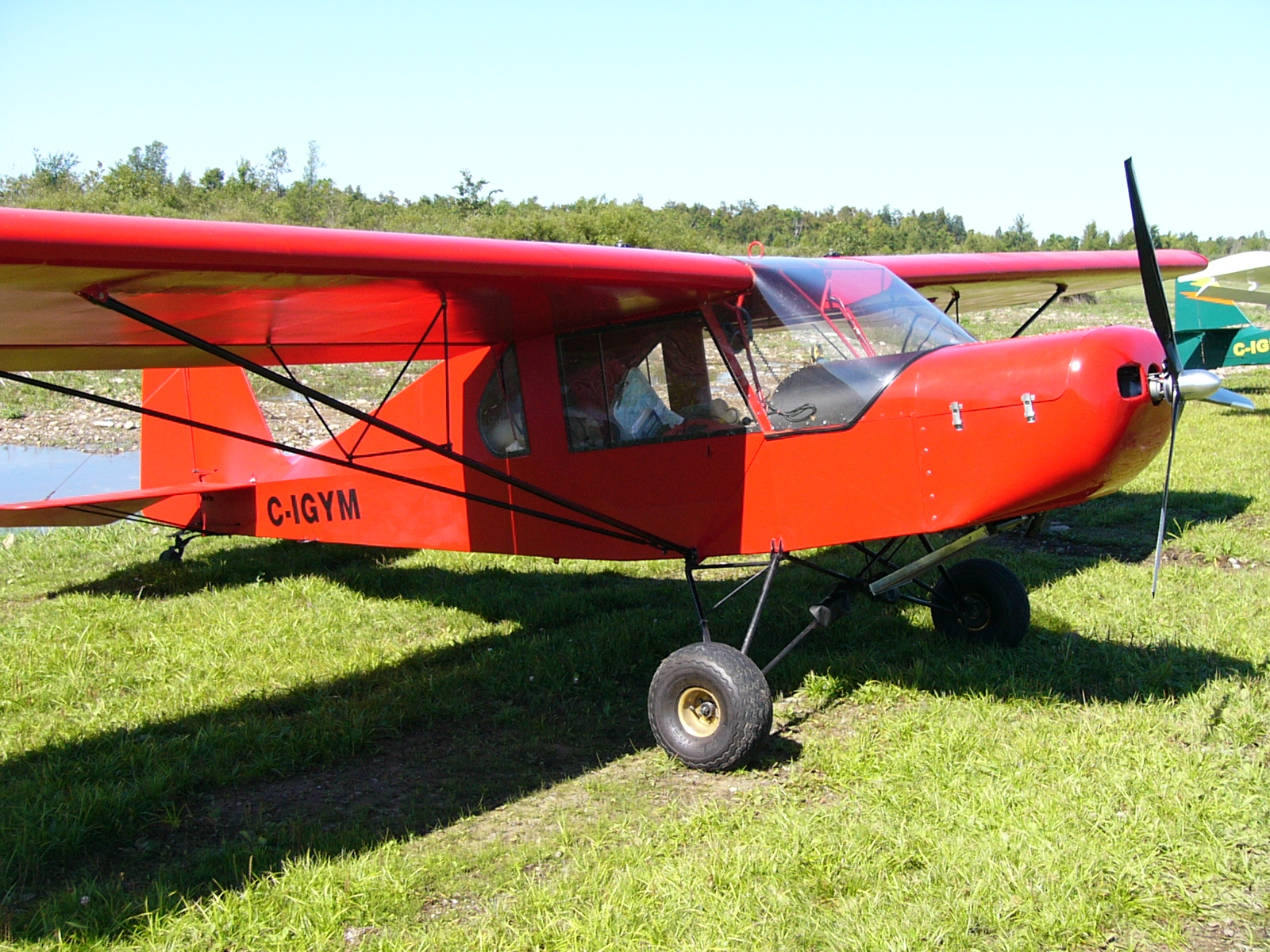
- L'il Hustler Aviation L'il Buzzard

General information
- Type: Ultralight aircraft
- National origin: Canada
- Manufacturer: Buzzman ARVS; L'il Hustler Ultralight Aviation
- Designer: Jesse Anglen (J-6 Karatoo); Dave Loveman, Ted Van Erp (L'il Buzzard development)
- Status: In production
- Number built: 100 (June 2002)

History
- Manufactured: 1990-present
- Introduction date: 1990
- Developed from: Anglin J6 Karatoo

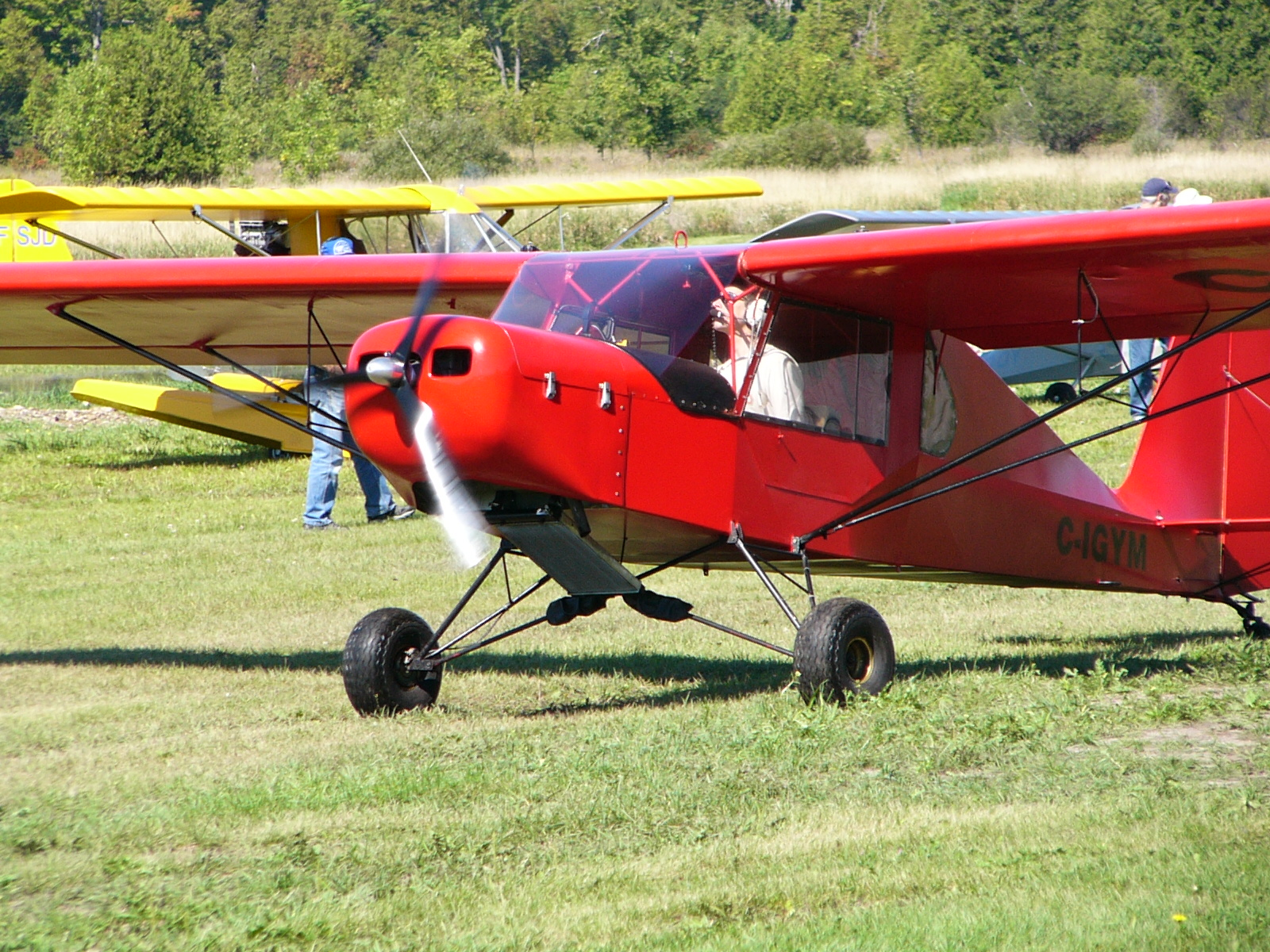
L'il Hustler Aviation L'il Buzzard

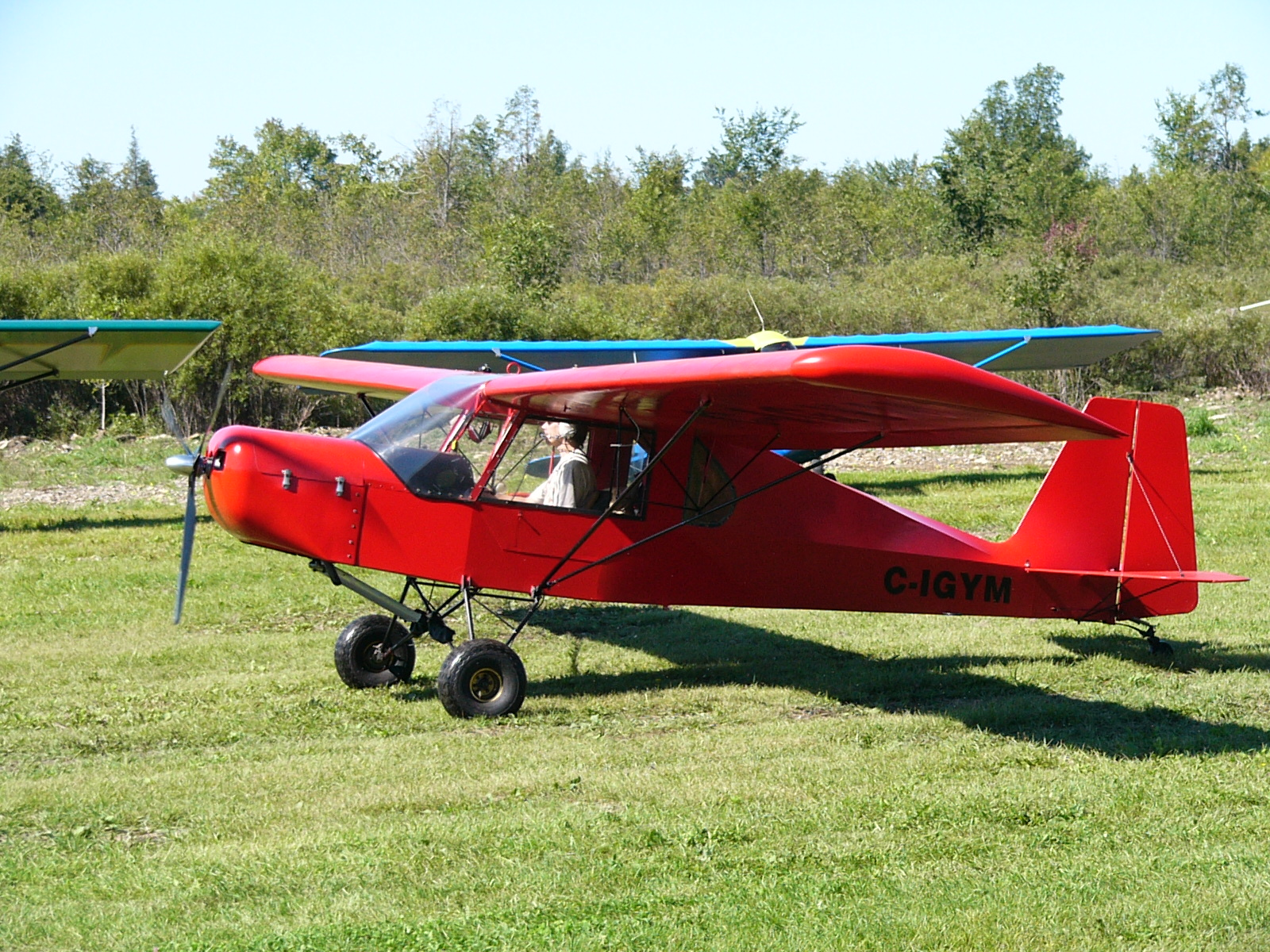
L'il Hustler Aviation L'il Buzzard

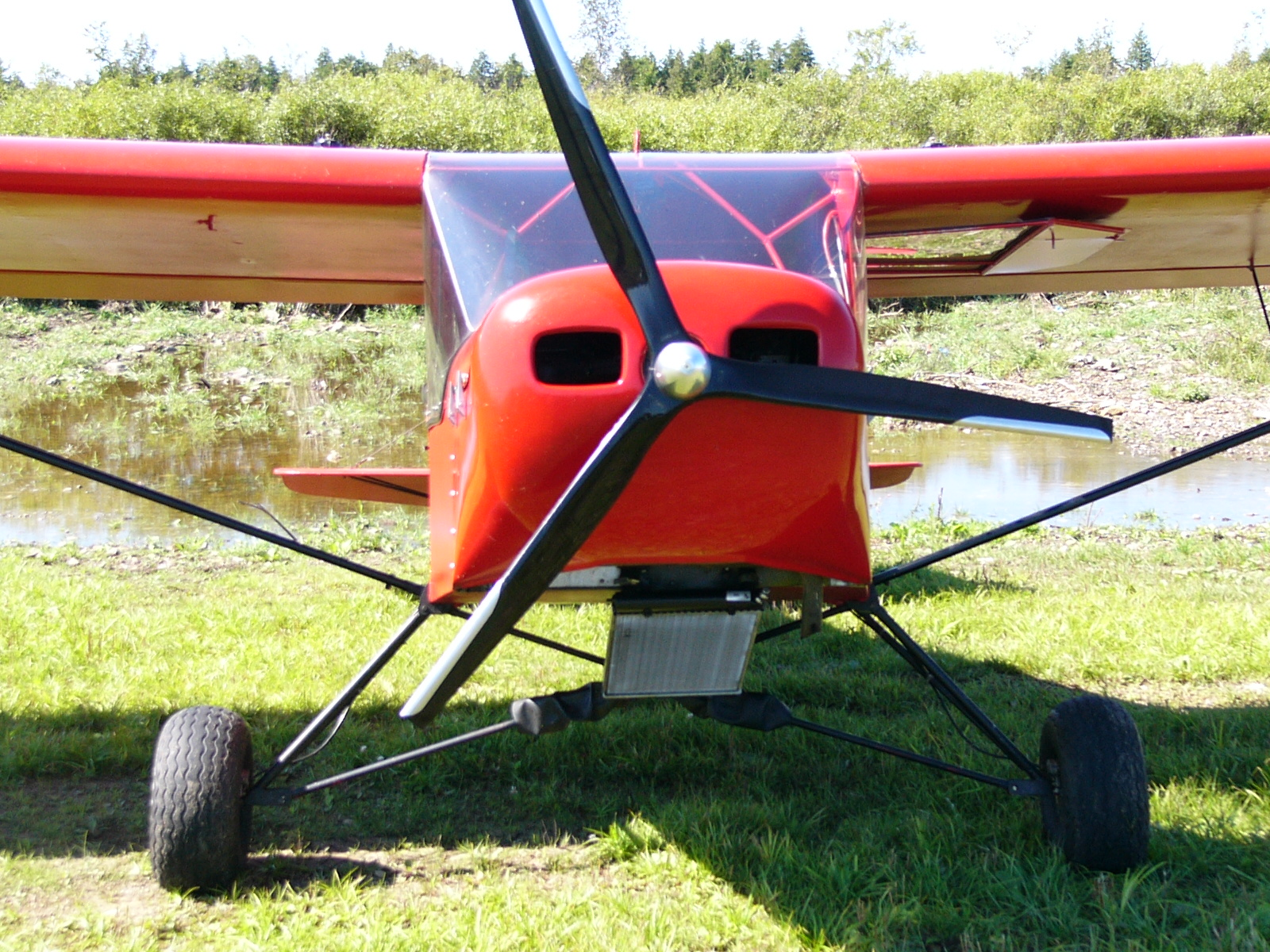
L'il Hustler Aviation L'il Buzzard

The Buzzman L'il Buzzard is a Canadian, two seat side-by-side configuration, high wing, strut-braced, conventional landing gear, tractor configuration, ultralight aircraft, originally manufactured by Buzzman ARVS and later by L'il Hustler Ultralight Aviation of Holland Landing, Ontario. The aircraft is sold mostly assembled, less only paint, engine and instruments.

The aircraft is unusual in that the manufacturer offers the airframe for sale without any warranty and without shipping insurance.

== Design and development ==
A development of the 1982 vintage Anglin J6 Karatoo, the L'il Buzzard was introduced in 1990. The design goals included low-cost, durability in the trainer role, fast construction time and ease of maintenance. Because it is not on the list of approved advanced ultralights and, being delivered fully assembled is not eligible for registration as an amateur-built aircraft, Canadian registered L'il Buzzards are basic ultralights.

The aircraft is constructed with a welded 4130 steel tube fuselage and aluminium wings, built up from a D-cell on an I-beam spar. The aircraft is covered with painted aircraft fabric. The wing is braced by a V-strut with jury struts. The landing gear is of taildragger configuration, with bungee suspended main wheels and a sprung, steerable tailwheel. The aircraft has standard dual controls, adjustable left hand control stick, adjustable seats and a 44 in (112 cm) wide cabin. Flaperons are optional and reduce the stall speed to 27 mph (43 km/h) from 35 mph (56 km/h).

The aircraft comes with float fittings welded onto the airframe and can also be operated on skis. The standard engine is the 64 hp (48 kW) Rotax 582, but engines up to 100 hp (75 kW) can be fitted.

The company claims a 40-hour assembly time from the supplied completed airframe to install the engine and paint the aircraft.

== Operational history ==
The manufacturer claimed that by 2002 one hundred aircraft had been delivered to customers. In November 2016 there were 19 L'il Buzzard variants registered in Canada, comprising 15 L'il Buzzards, two L'il Hustlers and two L'il Hustler SS models.

== Variants ==
L'il Buzzard
Basic version with a 64 hp (48 kW) Rotax 582 engine.
L'il Buzzard TWS 582
Improved version with a 64 hp (48 kW) Rotax 582 engine.
Lil Hustler
Equipped with an 80 hp (60 kW) Rotax 912UL engine.
Lil Hustler SS
Equipped with a 100 hp (75 kW) Rotax 912ULS engine.
L'il Hustler TR
Tricycle gear version

== Specifications (L'il Buzzard) ==
Data from Cliche and L'il Hustler

General characteristics

- Crew: one
- Capacity: one passenger
- Length: 20 ft 6 in (6.25 m)
- Wingspan: 33 ft 6 in (10.21 m)
- Wing area: 172 sq ft (16.0 m^{2})
- Empty weight: 500 lb (227 kg)
- Gross weight: 1,200 lb (544 kg) in the Canadian basic ultralight category, 1500 lbs in the amateur-built category.
- Fuel capacity: 10 US gallons (38 litres)
- Powerplant: 1 × Rotax 582 , 64 hp (48 kW)
- Propellers: 2-bladed wooden fixed pitch

Performance

- Cruise speed: 80 mph (130 km/h, 70 kn)
- Stall speed: 35 mph (56 km/h, 30 kn)
- Never exceed speed: 120 mph (190 km/h, 100 kn)
- Range: 350 mi (560 km, 300 nmi)
- Rate of climb: 700 ft/min (3.6 m/s)
- Wing loading: 6.98 lb/sq ft (34.1 kg/m^{2})

Avionics

- none

== See also ==
Related development

- Norman Aviation J6 Karatoo - another version of the basic Karatoo design

Aircraft of comparable role, configuration, and era

- Aces High Cuby
- Wag-Aero Wag-a-Bond
