= Bréguet 903 =

Single-seat French glider, 1950s

General information
- Type: sailplane
- National origin: France
- Manufacturer: Société des Ateliers d'Aviation Louis Bréguet (Bréguet Aviation)
- Designer: Jean Cayla
- Number built: 1

History
- First flight: never flew

The Bréguet 903 was a single seat French competition sailplane from the 1950s.

== Design ==
The Bréguet 903 was a glider intended for flying at very high altitude (more than 12,000 m), particularly for weather and atmospheric physics research. It was planned to release it at the maximum altitude allowed by a tow plane flying over 200 km/h.

== Development ==
The Br 902's initial conception dates back to the Second World War. It was improved in 1945, taking into account research conducted in Nazi Germany during the high-altitude glider conflict, including DFS 228. It was initially performed at the Arsenal of Aeronautics, by a team including engineers Raymond Jarlaud, Roger Cartier and Bernard Schneider among others. After abandonment by the Arsenal, the construction contract was taken over by S.E.V.I.M.I.A. (Société d'Etudes Victor Minié Aéronautique) receiving the designation SEVIMIA S.10.From March 1954, Bréguet, which had created a sailplane department, turn took over the study and completion of the S-10, under the name of Bréguet 903, to fit in with the Br 900 to Br 906 series, though having no relationship to any.

The construction of the prototype was continued at the Aire-sur-Adour plant under the direction of Roger Cartier, the program is still under the responsibility of Raymond Jarlaud. The apparatus, whose construction was abnormally long, never flew. He undergoes static tests, then tests of resistance of the cabin with the pressure and the cold, in the laboratory of the factories Chausson. The waterproof cabin was then tested in caisson at Brétigny in 1958. But the interest offered by the project seemed limited now. We had become less optimistic about the altitude he could reach. The program was definitively abandoned at the beginning of 1960.

== Specifications ==
Data from Les Avions Breguet (1940/1971), DOCAVIA No.6

General characteristics

- Crew: 1
- Length: 11.42 m (37 ft 6 in)
- Wingspan: 24.2 m (79 ft 5 in)
- Height: 2.6 m (8 ft 6 in)
- Wing area: 41.64 m^{2} (448.2 sq ft)
- Aspect ratio: 14.1
- Airfoil: NACA 63 series
- Empty weight: 680 kg (1,499 lb)
- Max takeoff weight: 775 kg (1,709 lb)

Performance

- Never exceed speed: 360 km/h (220 mph, 190 kn)
- Rate of sink: 0.7 m/s (140 ft/min) at 65 km/h (40.4 mph; 35.1 kn)
- Lift-to-drag: 30:1
- Wing loading: 18.65 kg/m^{2} (3.82 lb/sq ft)
