= Brändli BX-2 Cherry =

BX-2 Cherry
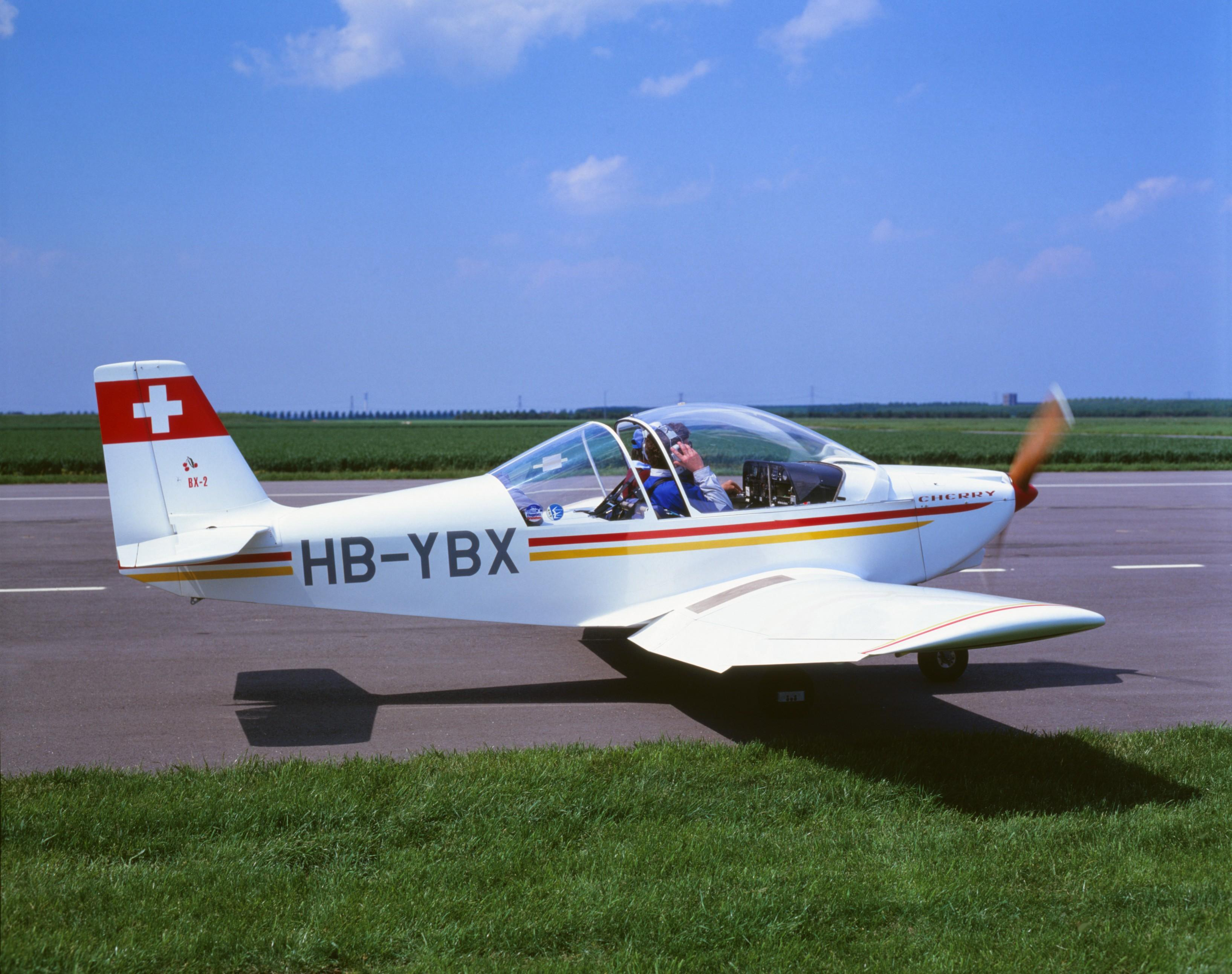

General information
- Type: 2-seat sport homebuilt aircraft
- National origin: Switzerland
- Designer: Max Brändli
- Number built: >100 by 2010

History
- First flight: 24 April 1982

The Brändli BX-2 Cherry is two-seat sport homebuilt aircraft, designed by Max Brändli. More than one hundred had been constructed by 2010.

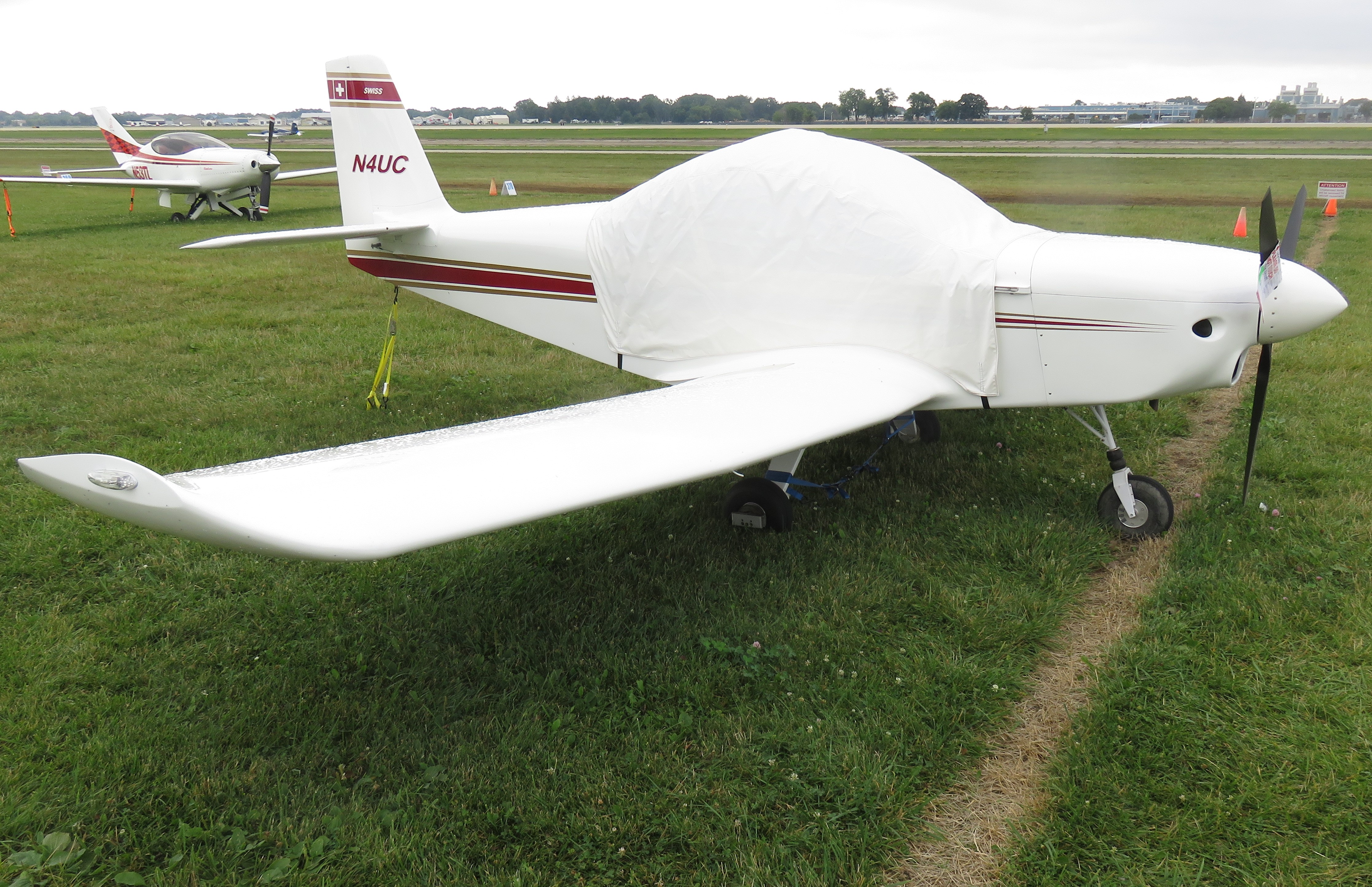
Cherry BX-2 with a Viking Engine on display in 2016

== Design and development ==
Max Brändli designed the Cherry in 1979 when he was 55 years old and started its construction in his cellar. He carried out all the structural and aerodynamic calculations and supervised the building, which took 3½ years and 5,500 hours of work. He also flew it on its first flight on 24 April 1982.

The Cherry is a low wing monoplane. It has a wood-framed fuselage and wings with wooden spars, styrofoam cores and glass fibre covering. The inner sections of the wings have constant chord and carry flaps; the outer sections are straight tapered with ailerons. The wings can be removed rapidly for transport. The tail surfaces are straight tapered and the stabilator is fitted with a full-span anti-servo tab.

The Cherry seats two, in side-by-side configuration under a large, almost fully transparent, forward sliding canopy. It has a retractable tricycle undercarriage, with simple, outward folding main gear. A non-retractable undercarriage is an option. The prototype was powered by a 65 hp (49 kW) Continental A65 flat four engine; since then, Cherrys have used flat fours with power of up to 100 hp (75 kW), including some from the Continental range, the Volkswagen-derived Limbach L.2400 and the Rotax 912. Also the flat 2-cylinder motorcycle derived BMW R1200GS has been used.

== Operational history ==
The Cherry is kit-built from plans, with some components provided. By 2010, more than 240 sets of plans had been sold and over 100 aircraft completed. In mid-2010, 76 were registered in Europe west of Russia, flying in Austria, the Czech Republic, France, Germany, the Netherlands, Switzerland, Slovenia and the UK.

The prototype Cherry, HB-YBX flew around Europe for 25 years; in 2009, it crashed after take-off from Sundsvall-Härnösand Airport in Sweden, killing both Dani Gerwer and its designer, Max Brändli.

== Specifications ==
Data from Simpson p.114

General characteristics

- Capacity: 2
- Length: 5.31 m (17 ft 5 in)
- Wingspan: 6.98 m (22 ft 11 in)
- Height: 1.7 m (5 ft 7 in)
- Empty weight: 320 kg (705 lb)
- Max takeoff weight: 550 kg (1,213 lb)
- Powerplant: 1 × Teledyne Continental C90 4-cylinder horizontally opposed air-cooled, 67 kW (90 hp)

Performance

- Maximum speed: 260 km/h (160 mph, 140 kn)
- Cruise speed: 220 km/h (140 mph, 120 kn)
- Range: 800 km (500 mi, 430 nmi)
- Endurance: 7 h
- Rate of climb: 3.0 m/s (590 ft/min)
