= Bréguet 482 =

French aircraft

Br 482

General information
- Type: Heavy bomber
- National origin: France
- Manufacturer: Bréguet Aviation
- Status: Abandoned prototype
- Number built: 2

History
- First flight: 27 November 1947

The Bréguet 482 was a French four-engined heavy bomber aircraft designed just prior to the outbreak of the Second World War with two prototypes nearing completion when Germany invaded France in 1940, one of which was flown after the end of the war as an experimental platform.

== Development and design ==
In December 1936 the French Air Ministry issued a specification for a four-seat, twin-engined bomber, with Bréguet's initial design, the Bréguet 480 (or Bre. 480) to be powered with the specified 914 kW (1,226 hp) Gnome et Rhône 14L radial engines, intended to carry 1,000 kg (2,200 lb) of bombs over a 2,500 km (1,600 mi) radius of action. Gnome et Rhône abandoned the 14L however, so, after considering a version powered by two Hispano-Suiza 12Y V12 engines, Bréguet reworked the design as the Bréguet 482, with four 1,007 kW (1,350 hp) Hispano-Suiza 12Z engines, with an order for two prototypes placed by the French Air Ministry on 12 May 1938.

The Bréguet 482 was a mid-winged monoplane of all-metal construction, with a clean, low-drag, oval section monocoque fuselage, twin tails and a retractable tailwheel undercarriage. The planned defensive armament was a 20 mm (0.79 in) Hispano-Suiza HS.404 cannon in a power-operated dorsal position, with a 7.5 mm (0.30 in) machine gun in the nose and a further two machine guns in ventral mountings. Up to 2,500 kg (5,500 lb) of bombs could be carried.

== Operational history ==
Construction of the two prototypes was well advanced when Germany invaded France on 10 May 1940, and in late May the nearly complete prototypes were evacuated from Villacoublay near Paris, with the first prototype being sent to Bône in Algeria and the second to the Bréguet factory at Anglet, near Bayonne in the far south-west of France. The first prototype was destroyed in Algeria during a German air raid following the Allied invasion of French North Africa, but the second prototype remained untouched, despite the fact that Anglet was occupied by the Germans from 1940.

After the Germans had been driven out, Bréguet resumed work on the Br 482, and proposed to complete it with more powerful Hispano-Suiza 12Z engines and a heavier armament. The French Armée de l'Air had no requirement for it however, and it was decided to use the aircraft with some of the planned modifications as a research aircraft. It was flown for the first time in November 1947 and was used for various experiments, including testing of the 12Z engines.

== Variants ==
Bre 480
Original design, powered by two Gnome-et-Rhône 14L radial engines. Unbuilt.
Bre 481
Proposed versions with two Hispano-Suiza 12Y engines and reduced wing area.

Bre 481 B4
Planned bomber version of Bre 481. Unbuilt.

Bre 481 Raid

Planned long-range record aircraft with further reduced wing area.

Bre 482 B4
Four-engined bomber powered by Hispano-Suiza 12Z engines.

Bre 482 No 1
First prototype - destroyed 1942.

Br 482 No 2

Second prototype, completed 1947 as three-seat research aircraft.

== Specifications (Bréguet Br 482) ==
Data from

General characteristics

- Crew: three
- Length: 18.86 m (61 ft 11 in)
- Wingspan: 24.09 m (79 ft 0 in)
- Height: 5.21 m (17 ft 1 in)
- Wing area: 64.4 m^{2} (693 sq ft)
- Empty weight: 10,450 kg (23,038 lb)
- Gross weight: 14,500 kg (31,967 lb)
- Powerplant: 4 × Hispano-Suiza 12Z liquid-cooled V12 engine, 1,007 kW (1,350 hp) each (take off power)

Performance

- Maximum speed: 560 km/h (350 mph, 300 kn) at 8,000 m (26,000 ft)
- Cruise speed: 529 km/h (329 mph, 286 kn)
- Range: 1,519 km (944 mi, 820 nmi)
- Service ceiling: 12,000 m (39,000 ft)

Armament

- None as completed.

== See also ==
Related development

- Bréguet 500 Colmar

Aircraft of comparable role, configuration, and era

- Bloch MB.162
- Avro Manchester
