= Bréguet 900 Louisette =

Single-seat French glider, 1948

Bréguet Br 900 Louisette

General information
- Type: Single seat competition sailplane
- National origin: France
- Manufacturer: Société des Ateliers d'Aviation Louis Bréguet (Bréguet Aviation)
- Designer: Georges Ricard
- Number built: 8

History
- First flight: 17 June 1948

The Bréguet Br 900 Louisette was a short-span, single-seat competition sailplane built in France in the 1940s. It set some French gliding records but was unsuccessful at the international level. Only six production aircraft were built.

== Design and development ==
Despite its long history of aircraft design and production, Bréguet Aviation had not built a glider before the 900. After World War II they found themselves with many craftsmen who had skills in building with wood, so light aviation and unpowered aircraft offered a market opportunity. George Ricard designed a wooden, single-seat, mid-wing cantilever monoplane which, though intended for competition, had the comparatively short span of 14.35 m (47 ft 1 in).

The wings of the Bréguet 900 were straight-tapered, with squared off tips with small tip fences. They had marked dihedral. Forward of the single box spar the wing was plywood covered, with fabric aft. Narrow ailerons occupied the outer halves of the wing trailing edge, with flaps of the same chord inboard. From the second prototype onwards the Bréguet 900 had spoilers at about mid-chord just inboard of the ailerons. On the earliest aircraft these were of the DFS type but were later replaced by Schempp-Hirth parallel ruler action brakes.

The fuselage of the Bréguet 900 was plywood-covered and of oval cross-section, nearly circular aft of the wing and deepening markedly to accommodate the cockpit. The fin and rudder were also ply-covered, bearing fabric-covered control surfaces. The horn balanced rudder was broad and reached between the elevators to the bottom of the fuselage. Some production aircraft had taller vertical surfaces than those of earlier 900s. The straight-tapered horizontal surfaces folded upwards for ease of transport. Early models used an angular, multi-piece canopy, later supplanted by a smooth single piece Plexiglas one. The rear of the canopy joined the high upper fuselage line continuously. The Bréguet 900 landed on a fixed monowheel undercarriage with a protective ash noseskid ahead of it. Unusually, the tow-release involved two hooks, one on either side of the fuselage just under the wing leading edge.

The first prototype flew on 17 June 1948, the second in the following March.

== Operational history ==
Soon after its first flight in March 1949 the second prototype, equipped with DFS airbrakes and flaps and flown by Paul Lepanse, set a new French distance record of 470 km (290 mi). This was later broken by Roger Biagi in the second production aircraft (900S-2) with a distance of 525 km (326 mi). 900S-4, piloted by Robert Delhoume, set a record speed around a 100 km (62 mi) triangle.

The 900 competed in two World Gliding Championships without success: in 1950 the second prototype was wrecked after an airbrake failure and in 1952 900S-5 was placed 21st out of 39, limited by its short span.

One restored Bréguet 900S, the first production machine, remained on the French civil register in 2010.

== Variants ==
900
Two prototypes. 1st had spoilers and no flaps, 2nd DFS airbrakes and flaps.
900S
Six production aircraft, all slightly different: Schempp-Hirth airbrakes, a single piece canopy and a taller fin introduced piecemeal.

== Specifications ==
Data from Sailplanes 1945-1965

General characteristics

- Crew: 1
- Length: 6.50 m (21 ft 4 in)
- Wingspan: 14.35 m (47 ft 1 in)
- Wing area: 12.9 m^{2} (139 sq ft)
- Aspect ratio: 15.85
- Airfoil: Bréguet 14
- Empty weight: 211 kg (465 lb)
- Gross weight: 306 kg (675 lb)

Performance

- Stall speed: 40 km/h (25 mph, 22 kn) with 30° flaps
- Never exceed speed: 180 km/h (110 mph, 97 kn)
- Maximum glide ratio: best 27:1 at 78 km/h (48 mph; 42 kn)
- Rate of sink: 0.75 m/s (148 ft/min) minimum at 73 km/h (45 mph; 39 kn)
- Wing loading: 23.8 kg/m^{2} (4.9 lb/sq ft)

== Bibliography ==
- Cuny, Jean & Leyvastre, Pierre (1977). Les Avions Breguet (1940/1971). DOCAVIA (in French). Vol. 6. Paris: Editions Larivière. OCLC 440863702.
- Narbonne, Roland de (May 2008). "Mai 1948, dans l'aéronautique française: Le planeur de performance" [May 1948 in French Aeronautics: The Performance Glider]. Le Fana de l'Aviation (in French) (462): 76–77. ISSN 0757-4169.
