= Breguet LE =

Prototype French WW1 fighter aircraft

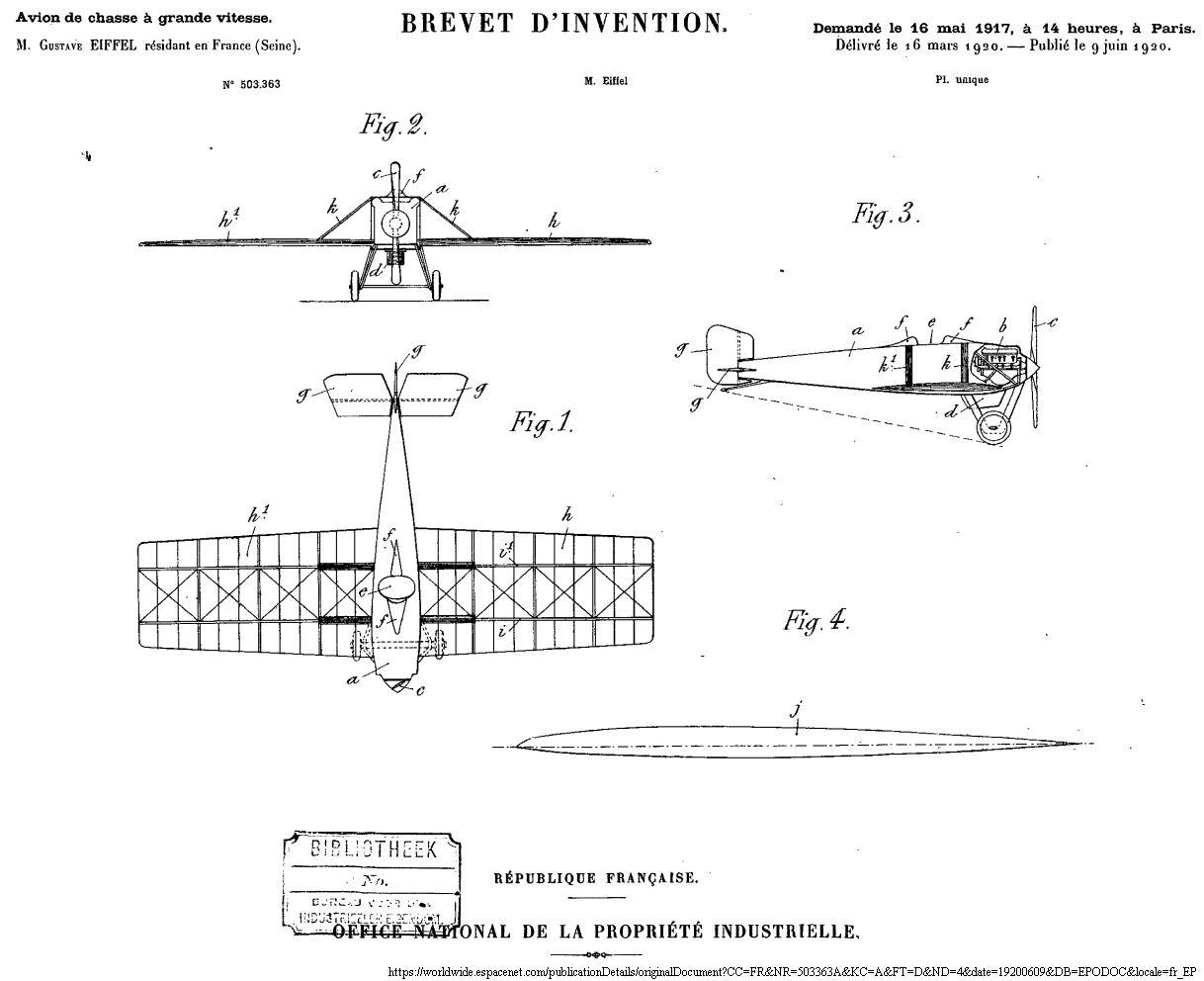

General information
- Type: Prototype fighter
- Manufacturer: Breguet Aviation
- Status: Cancelled
- Number built: 1

History
- First flight: March 1918

The Breguet LE or Breguet Laboratoire Eiffel was a prototype French monoplane fighter built during World War I. The sole aircraft completed crashed on its second flight in 1918, killing the pilot. The program was terminated and the two other aircraft under construction with more powerful engines were broken up.

== Specifications (performance data estimated) ==
Data from De l'avion Eiffel au LeO 9: Le chasseur trop en avance sur son temps

General characteristics

- Crew: 1
- Length: 6.35 m (20 ft 10 in)
- Wingspan: 9.78 m (32 ft 1 in)
- Height: 2.0 m (6 ft 7 in)
- Wing area: 20 m^{2} (220 sq ft)
- Empty weight: 495 kg (1,091 lb)
- Gross weight: 700 kg (1,543 lb)
- Powerplant: 1 × Hispano-Suiza 8 Ab liquid-cooled V8 engine, 130 kW (180 hp)
- Propellers: 2-bladed

Performance

- Maximum speed: 270 km/h (170 mph, 150 kn)
- Endurance: 2 hours
- Service ceiling: 8,000 m (26,000 ft)
- Time to altitude: 4 minutes, 1 second to 2,000 m (6,600 ft)

Armament

- Guns: 1 or 2 machine guns

== Bibliography ==
- Davilla, Dr. James J. & Soltan, Arthur M. (1997). French Aircraft of the First World War. Stratford, Connecticut: Flying Machines Press. ISBN 0-9637110-4-0.
- Green, William & Swanborough, Gordon (2001) [1994]. The Complete Book of Fighters: An Illustrated Encyclopedia of Every Fighter Built and Flown (Revised and Updated ed.). London: Salamander Books. ISBN 1-84065-269-1.
- Owers, Colin A. (2020). French Warplanes of WWI: A Centennial Perspective on Great War Airplanes. Gret War Aviation Centennial Series (43). Vol. 1: Fighters. n.p.: Aeronaut Books. ISBN 978-1-935881-93-3.
- Riccio, Philippe (November–December 2019). "De l'avion Eiffel au LeO 9: Le chasseur trop en avance sur son temps" [From the Eiffel Aircraft to the LeO 9: The Fighter Too Far in Advance of Its Time]. Avions (in French) (232): 67–79. ISSN 1243-8650.
