= Buchanan BAC-204 Ozzie Mozzie =

BAC-204 Ozzie Mozzie

General information
- Type: Two-seat very light aircraft
- National origin: Australia
- Manufacturer: Buchanan Aircraft Corporation
- Number built: 1

History
- First flight: 11 December 1990

The Buchanan BAC-204 Ozzie Mozzie is an Australian two-seat light aircraft designed and built by Buchanan Aircraft Corporation of Queensland for certification to meet JAR-VLA.

== Design and development ==
The Ozzie Mozzie was launched in May 1987 with construction started in August 1989, the prototype registered VH-OZE first flew on 11 December 1990.

The Ozzie Mozzie has an all-composite structure and is a mid-wing cantilever monoplane with a conventional tail. The prototype is powered by an 80 hp (60 kW) Rotax 912-A1 flat-four piston engine. It has a fixed tricycle landing gear and an enclosed cockpit for two sitting side by side under a one-piece canopy.

== Specifications ==
Data from

General characteristics

- Crew: 2
- Length: 6.40 m (21 ft 0 in)
- Wingspan: 10.5 m (34 ft 5.5 in)
- Height: 2.30 m (7 ft 6.5 in)
- Wing area: 10.20 m^{2} (109.79 sq ft)
- Empty weight: 350 kg (771 lb)
- Gross weight: 600 kg (1,323 lb)
- Powerplant: 1 × Rotax 912-A flat-four piston engine , 60 kW (80 hp)

Performance

- Maximum speed: 278 km/h (172 mph, 149 kn)
- Cruise speed: 185 km/h (115 mph, 100 kn)
- Stall speed: 89 km/h (56 mph, 49 kn)
- Range: 973 km (604 mi, 525 nmi)
- Service ceiling: 5,490 m (18,000 ft)
- Rate of climb: 4.1 m/s (800 ft/min)
