= Bristol BX-200 =

BX-200

General information
- Type: Two-seat homebuilt monoplane
- National origin: United States
- Designer: Uriel Bristol
- Number built: 1

History
- First flight: 15 July 1986

The Bristol BX-200 is an American two-seat cross-country homebuilt monoplane designed and built by Uriel Bristol for amateur construction from plans or kits.

== Design and development ==
The prototype registered N3UB first flew on 15 July 1986 and was a mid-wing monoplane with tubular steel fuselage and wooden wings. The prototype had a fixed conventional landing gear with a tailwheel and was powered by a 180 hp (134 kW) Lycoming O-360-A4A piston engine. The enclosed cockpit has two seats side-by-side and room for 50 lb (22.7 kg) of baggage. In general layout, it is similar to the Cassutt Special racer.

In the 1988 Sun 60 Air Race, N3UB was timed at a closed course speed of 219 mph, placing it second in its horsepower class (behind a Glasair RG at 227 mph) and fifth overall.

== Specifications (Prototype) ==
Data from Jane's All the World's Aircraft 1989-90

General characteristics

- Crew: 2
- Length: 5.31 m (17 ft 5 in)
- Wingspan: 6.10 m (20 ft 0 in)
- Height: 1.50 m (4 ft 11 in)
- Wing area: 8.36 m^{2} (90.0 sq ft)
- Empty weight: 363 kg (800 lb)
- Gross weight: 612 kg (1,350 lb)
- Powerplant: 1 × Lycoming O-360-A4A , 134 kW (180 hp)

Performance

- Maximum speed: 398 km/h (247 mph, 215 kn)
- Cruise speed: 352 km/h (219 mph, 190 kn)
- Range: 926 km (575 mi, 500 nmi)
- Endurance: 2 hours 30 minutes
- Service ceiling: 6,100 m (20,000 ft)
- g limits: +6/-3
- Rate of climb: 610 m/s (2,000 ft/min)
