= Bristol Grampus =

Grampus

General information
- Type: Passenger aircraft
- National origin: United Kingdom
- Manufacturer: Bristol Aeroplane Company
- Designer: Frank Barnwell
- Number built: None

The Bristol Grampus was a British prototype biplane passenger aircraft proposed by the British and Colonial Aeroplane Company but not built.

== Design and development ==
Following the end of the First World War, the British and Colonial Aeroplane Company looked at producing a general-purpose passenger or cargo aircraft. Frank Barnwell proposed a single-engined biplane for six passengers, powered by a 500 hp (373 kW) Siddeley Tiger engine and named Grampus I. The directors of the company thought it too large for the proposed market and were concerned about the supply of Tiger engines. Barnwell returned with a smaller three-passenger Grampus II powered initially by a 150 hp (112 kW) RAF 4a air-cooled engine which would be replaced by the Siddeley Lynx radial engine on production aircraft. The directors did not approve of the design, nor of two eight-passenger variants also proposed. In February 1920 the project was abandoned as none of the designs appeared to meet the criteria for an Air Ministry competition.

== Variants ==
Type 31 Grampus I
Proposed six-passenger variant powered by a 500 hp (373 kW) Siddeley Tiger engine, not built.
Type 42 Grampus II
Proposed three-passenger variant powered by a 150 hp (112 kW) RAF 4a engine, not built.
Type 43 Grampus IV
Proposed eight-passenger variant powered by four Lucifer engines, not built.
Type 57 Grampus V
Proposed variant of the Grampus IV for the American market with two Hall-Scott engines, not built.
