= Bréguet 790 Nautilus =

French coastal patrol flying-boat, 1939

General information
- Type: Coastal patrol flying-boat
- National origin: France
- Manufacturer: Bréguet Aviation
- Number built: 2

History
- First flight: 1939

The Bréguet 790 Nautilus was a prototype French three-seat coastal patrol flying-boat designed and built by Bréguet Aviation to meet a requirement from the French navy.

== Development ==
The Nautilus had a high-set monoplane wing on a single-step hull, the wing being fabric covered and the hull all-metal. The aircraft was powered by a 720 hp (537 kW) Hispano-Suiza 12Xirs V-12 piston engine strut-mounted above the hull, driving a pusher propeller.

The first of two prototypes flew in 1939 and performed well enough that a production order for 75 was placed. The order was reduced to 45 in May 1940 in order to free production capacity for more urgently needed combat aircraft, but none were built following the German invasion.

== Variants ==
Bréguet 790
Basic three-seat coastal reconnaissance aircraft, powered by 540 kW (720 hp) Hispano-Suiza 12Xirs engine. Two prototypes built.
Bréguet 791
Proposed version powered by single 490 kW (660 hp) Gnome-Rhône 14M radial engine. Unbuilt.
Bréguet 792
Proposed version for ship-based reconnaissance aircraft, powered by two 270 kW (360 hp) Béarn 6 air-cooled inline engines. Unbuilt.

== Specifications ==
Data from

General characteristics

- Crew: 3
- Length: 13.00 m (42 ft 8 in)
- Wingspan: 17.00 m (55 ft 9 in)
- Height: 4.00 m (13 ft 1 in)
- Wing area: 33.00 m^{2} (355.2 sq ft)
- Empty weight: 2,700 kg (5,952 lb)
- Max takeoff weight: 3,600 kg (7,937 lb)
- Powerplant: 1 × Hispano-Suiza 12Xirs inline piston engine, 540 kW (720 hp)
- Propellers: 3-bladed

Performance

- Maximum speed: 310 km/h (190 mph, 170 kn)
- Cruise speed: 150 km/h (93 mph, 81 kn)
- Range: 900 km (560 mi, 490 nmi)
- Endurance: 6 hr at 90 mph (140 km/h)
- Service ceiling: 6,000 m (20,000 ft)
- Rate of climb: 7.30 m/s (1,437 ft/min)

Armament

- Guns: 1× 7.5 mm Darne machine gun in dorsal position
- Bombs: 2× 75 kg (165 lb) bombs underwing

== See also ==
Related lists

- List of flying boats and floatplanes
