= Bristol T.T.A. =

T.T.A

General information
- Type: Two-seat fighter
- National origin: United Kingdom
- Manufacturer: British and Colonial Aeroplane Company
- Designer: F. Barnwell & L.G. Frise
- Number built: 2

History
- First flight: 26 April 1916

The Bristol Type 6 T.T.A was a British two-seat, twin-engine biplane, designed in 1915 as a defence fighter. Two prototypes were built, but the T.T.A. did not go into production.

== Development ==
The Bristol T.T.A was designed in 1915 to a War Office requirement for a local defence aircraft. The T.T.A was a two-seat, twin-engine biplane with T.T. standing for twin tractor; the Bristol Type number 6 was added retrospectively in 1923. The guiding principles in the design were compactness and a wide field of fire from both cockpits.

The T.T.A was an unswept biplane with slight stagger, the wings having constant chord and carrying long ailerons on the upper planes. The wings were of three-bay construction, the inner interplane struts supporting the engines in rectangular nacelles midway between the wings. Twin-wheeled undercarriage units were mounted below each engine, with a tailskid and a noseskid to prevent nosing over. The large area tailplane was the same shape as that of the Scout D, with the same unbalanced elevators, but the finless rudder was balanced. The gunner sat in a cockpit in the nose of the aircraft, armed with two free-mounted 0.303 in (7.7 mm) Lewis Guns. The pilot, sitting behind the wing trailing edge, had a rear-pointing Lewis gun.

The original design, (the Bristol T.T.), envisaged the use of two 150 hp (110 kW) R.A.F. 4a engines, but the B.E.12 and R.E.8 aircraft had been given priority for these engines and Bristol were advised to use 120 hp (90 kW) Beardmore engines. With these engines, the aircraft was designated T.T.A, two prototypes were ordered and the first completed on 26 April 1916. The second followed in May, and both aircraft flew to Upavon for service tests. Top speed and climb rate were better than the T.T.'s higher powered but larger competitor, the F.E.4, but the aircraft was not liked and gained no production orders.

== Specifications ==
Data from Barnes 1970, p. 103

General characteristics

- Crew: two
- Length: 39 ft 2 in (11.94 m)
- Wingspan: 53 ft 6 in (16.31 m)
- Height: 12 ft 6 in (3.81 m)
- Wing area: 817 sq ft (75.9 m^{2})
- Empty weight: 3,820 lb (1,733 kg)
- Gross weight: 5,100 lb (2,313 kg)
- Powerplant: 2 × Beardmore water-cooled inline , 120 hp (90 kW) each

Performance

- Maximum speed: 87 mph (140 km/h, 76 kn)
- Rate of climb: 390 ft/min (2.0 m/s)

Armament

- 2 × 0.303 in (7.7 mm) Lewis guns in forward cockpit
- 1 × 0.303 in (7.7 mm) Lewis guns in pilot's cockpit
