= Bristol Badminton =

Type 99 Badminton
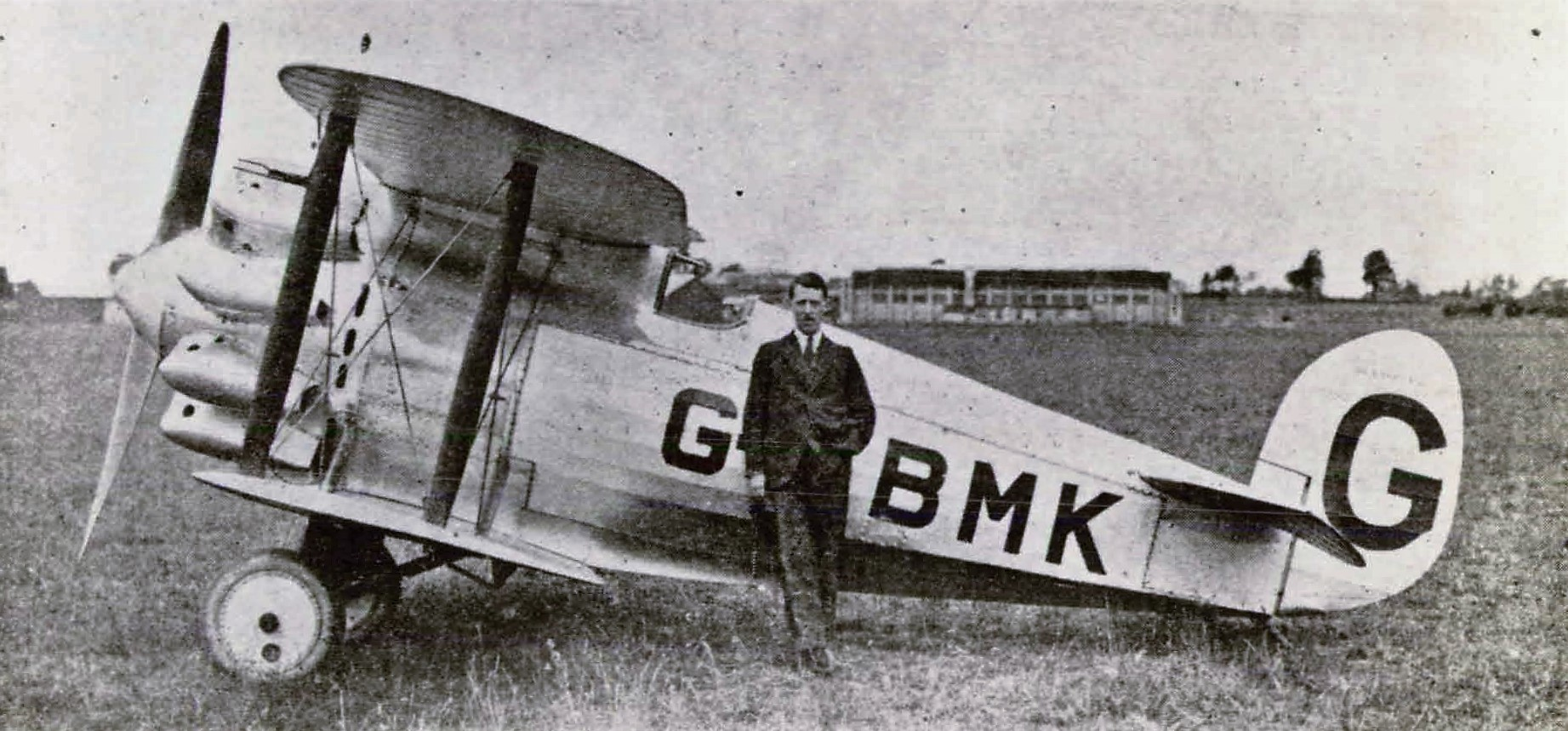

General information
- Type: Racing biplane
- National origin: United Kingdom
- Manufacturer: Bristol Aeroplane Company
- Designer: F.S. Barnwell
- Number built: 1

History
- First flight: 5 May 1926

The Bristol Type 99 Badminton was a 1920s British single-seat racing biplane built by the Bristol Aeroplane Company and designed by F.S. Barnwell.

== Design and development ==
The Badminton was a single-seat single-engine equal-span biplane, it was made from wood and metal with fabric covering. It had a conventional tailskid landing gear and the nose-mounted engine was a 510 hp (380 kW) Bristol Jupiter VI. Only one aircraft was built, registered G-EBMK, and it first flew at Filton Aerodrome on 5 May 1926. It was entered into the 1926 King's Cup Race but it forced-landed with a fuel feed problem. In 1927, the aircraft was rebuilt as the Type 99A with new wide-span tapered wings, a raised centre section and wide-chord interplane struts. It was powered by an uncowled (525 hp) (392 kW) Bristol Jupiter VI engine. It gained a certificate of airworthiness on 26 July 1927, but had a fatal crash at Filton two days later (28 July) after an engine failure on takeoff.

== Variants ==
Type 99
1926 single-seat racing biplane, one built.
Type 99A
Type 99 modified in 1927.

== Specifications (Type 99) ==
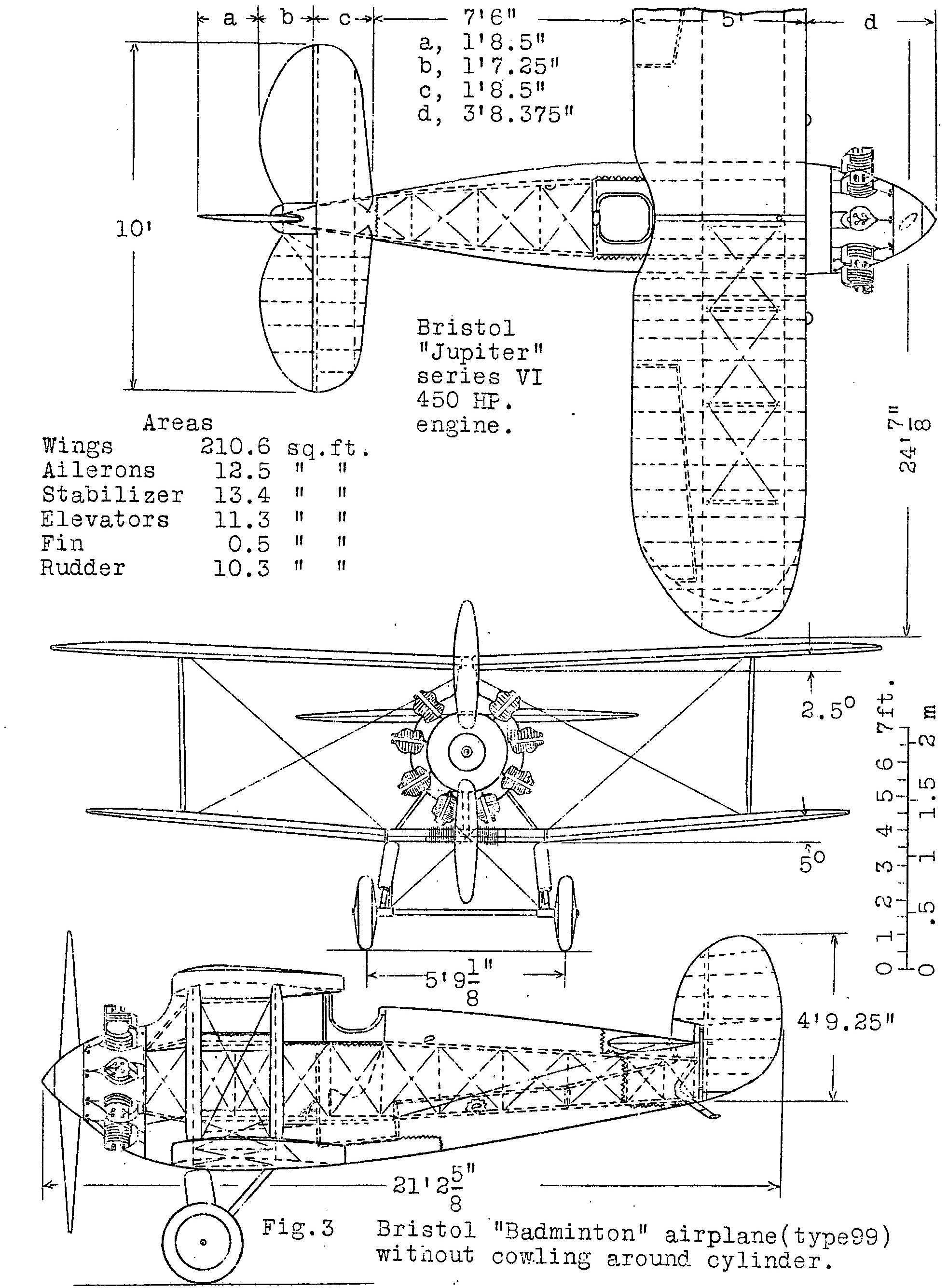
Bristol Badminton 3-view drawing from NACA Aircraft Circular No.19

Data from

General characteristics

- Crew: one
- Length: 21 ft 2.38 in (6.45 m)
- Wingspan: 24 ft 1 in (7.34 m)
- Empty weight: 1,840 lb (835 kg)
- Gross weight: 2,460 lb (1,116 kg)
- Powerplant: 1 × Bristol Jupiter VI , 510 hp (380 kW)

Performance

- Maximum speed: 160 mph (256 km/h, 140 kn)
