= Leslie Frise =

British aerospace engineer and aircraft designer

- Born: Leslie George Frise; 2 July 1895; Bristol, Gloucestershire, England
- Died: 26 September 1979 (aged 84); Bristol, Gloucestershire, England
- Occupations: Aerospace engineer and designer

Leslie George Frise FRAeS (2 July 1895 – 26 September 1979) was a British aerospace engineer and aircraft designer; he designed the Type 156 Bristol Beaufighter. He was involved in the development of aircraft and gun-turret hydraulic systems.

== Early life ==
Frise was born in Bristol, Gloucestershire, an area which is now known as South Gloucestershire. He was the son of William George Frise and Alice Cecilia Avery, of Hillside in Westbury-on-Trym, part of Barton Regis Rural District. In November 1887 his parents took part in the same production of Boots at the Swan by Charles Selby.

He was educated at Bristol Grammar School and gained a BSc degree in Mechanical Engineering from the University of Bristol. He had gained a Merchant Venturers scholarship in September 1912. He was awarded a second class degree in July 1915.

Early in First World War he served in the Royal Naval Air Service (RNAS).

His father died on Sunday 19 December 1943, and was buried at Canford Cemetery. His father was born in 1868 in Yetminster in north-west Dorset, south of Yeovil, the son of William Frise and Harriett King. The Frise family originated from Devon.

== Boulton Paul Aircraft ==
In 1915 he started Boulton Paul Aircraft's first aircraft factory at Mousehold Heath, Norwich to make 100 Sopwith Camels. The company was previously a general manufacturing firm that had begun in 1873.

== Bristol Aeroplane Company ==
In August 1915, Frank Barnwell rejoined Bristol Aeroplane Company and was looking for an assistant. He interviewed Leslie Frise and employed him in 1916; Frank Barnwell would become one of Bristol's main aircraft designers until his death on 2 August 1938 in an aviation accident. Barnwell developed the 1916 Bristol F.2 Fighter with Frise's assistance.

Frise aileron

He invented the Frise aileron, also known as the slotted aileron, in 1921, which is designed to counteract adverse yaw, which won him the Royal Aeronautical Society's Wakefield Gold Medal (for advances in aviation safety) awarded on 30 May 1933. The Frise aileron has an effect on parasitic drag so that the total drag on both wings is the same when an aircraft executes a roll.

In 1934 he developed, with Frank Barnwell, the Bristol Type 143, a monoplane with retractable undercarriage; only one prototype was made.

In 1936, when Barnwell became chief engineer, Frise became chief designer.

He was interviewed on the BBC Forces Programme at 8pm on Monday 25 May 1942. He left as designer on Wednesday 28 July 1943, becoming chief engineer.

He worked for 32 years for Bristol retiring, as chief engineer, in 1946 on grounds of ill health.

== Percival Aircraft ==
Frise joined Percival Aircraft in 1948 as technical director and chief engineer. He joined Percival in November 1948.

He designed a naval version of the Percival Prince and the Percival Sea Prince. He also designed the Percival Provost basic trainer and a jet-powered version the Jet Provost. In 1956 he left to become Director of Special Projects with Blackburn Aircraft.

At the Royal Aeronautical Society’s Barnwell memorial lecture in March 1967, he gave a lecture about the Beaufighter.

== Aircraft designed ==
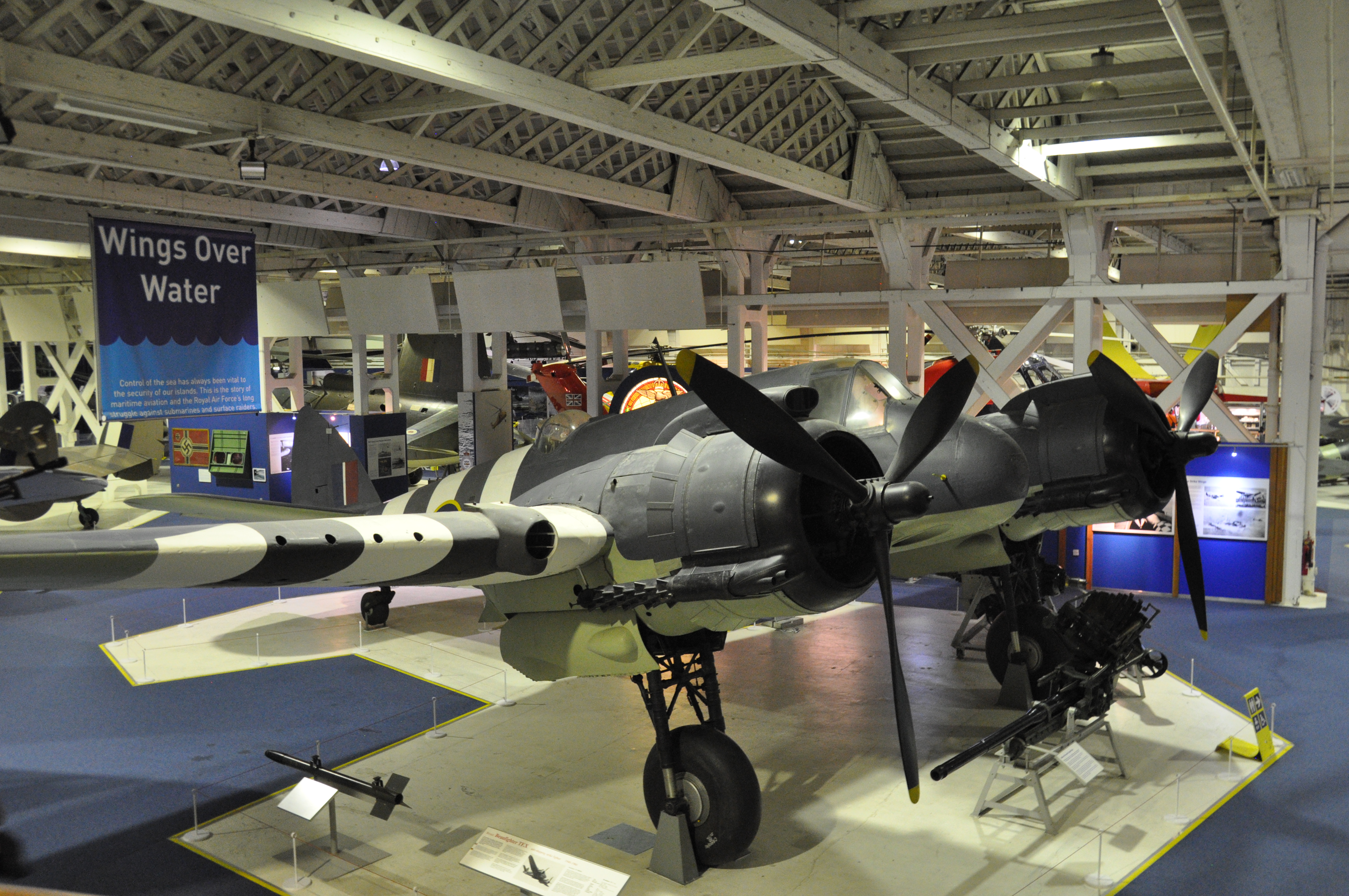
Bristol Beaufighter at the RAF Museum; it first flew on 17 July 1939; it entered operations on 17 September 1940

Frise was involved in the design of or lead the design team as chief engineer for the following aircraft:

- Bristol Beaufighter
- Bristol Beaufort
- Bristol Blenheim
- Bristol Brabazon
- Bristol Brigand
- Bristol Bulldog
- Bristol Freighter
- Hunting-Percival Jet Provost
- Percival Provost
- Percival Sea Prince

== Personal life ==
Frise married in 1922 in Bristol; they had a son born in 1938 and a daughter in 1948. He died in Bristol aged 84, in 1979. From the 1960s, he lived at 17 Richmond Terrace in Clifton.

He regularly played golf competitively, in foursomes.

He married Sybil Childs Knight, the daughter of Frederick Knight, of St Andrews, Bristol, on Saturday 29 April 1922 in Bishopston, Bristol, at St Michael and All Angels, on the A38 (demolished in the 1990s), conducted by Rev Ridgwell Barker.

His elder brother (William) Donald Frise (7 January 1894 - September 1977) married Vera Dorothy Pope on 16 June 1923. Donald's son was born on 26 May 1926, and another son, Derek Raymond King Frise, who studied English at Jesus College, Cambridge, who stood for the Conservatives in the Whitchurch Park ward in the 1999 Bristol City Council election.

His son was born on 27 April 1938, at St Brenda's Maternity Hospital in Clifton. Leslie Barnaby Knight Frise, son, attended Harrow School in the early 1950s, later lived at Frampton Cotterell in the early 1970s. He married Lorna Barrett, of Harrow, in 1965, and died aged 67 on Sunday July 17, 2005 in Grass Valley, California. Lorna died on 22 February 2016. He has a granddaughter Julia, in California.

When living on Bamville Wood at East Common, in Harpenden, his wife died on 30 July 1955. Sybil was born in 1898.

== Honours and awards ==
Frise was admitted to the Freedom of the City of London in 1948.

Business positions
| Preceded by Frank Barnwell | Chief Designer of the Bristol Aeroplane Company; August 1938 - April 1946 | Succeeded by Sir Archibald Russell |
