= Bristol Type 109 =

Type 109

General information
- Type: Long-distance biplane
- National origin: United Kingdom
- Manufacturer: Bristol Aeroplane Company
- Designer: Frank Barnwell
- Number built: 1

History
- First flight: 1928
- Retired: 1931

The Bristol Type 109 was a British two-seat long-distance biplane built by the Bristol Aeroplane Company at Filton Aerodrome, England.

== Design and development ==
The Type 109 was a single-engine two-seat conventional biplane built in 1928 for an attempt on the world distance record. The Type 109, registered G-EBZK and powered by a 480 hp (360 kW) Bristol Jupiter VIII radial engine, was first flown on 7 September 1928. The record attempt was abandoned and the aircraft was then modified to be used by Bert Hinkler for a world flight. The world flight was also abandoned and the aircraft was used by Bristol as an engine test bed for the Jupiter XIF engine. The Type 109 was scrapped in 1931, never having flown beyond the UK.

== Specifications ==
Data from

General characteristics

- Crew: 2
- Length: 37 ft 9 in (11.51 m)
- Wingspan: 51 ft 2 in (15.6 m)
- Height: 14 ft 0 in (4.27 m)
- Wing area: 700 sq ft (65.0 m^{2})
- Empty weight: 4,600 lb (2,085 kg)
- Gross weight: 9,800 lb (4,445 kg)
- Powerplant: 1 × Bristol Jupiter VIII piston radial engine , 480 hp (358 kW)

Performance

- Cruise speed: 90 mph (145 km/h, 78 kn)
- Range: 3,300 mi (5,300 km, 2,900 nmi)
