= Archibald Russell =

British aerospace engineer

Sir Archibald Russell, CBE, FRS (30 May 1904 – 29 May 1995) was a British aerospace engineer who worked most of his career at the Bristol Aeroplane Company, before becoming managing director of the Filton Division when Bristol merged into British Aircraft Corporation in 1960. He also served as the vice-chairman of the BAC-Sud Aviation Concorde Committee that produced the Concorde, working alongside Morien Morgan. His designs include the Blenheim, Britannia, Type 188 and many others. He was known throughout his career as a perfectionist, as well as his criticism for those who did not measure up – criticisms that included ministers, civil servants, the Brabazon Committee and BOAC.

== Early life and career ==
Archibald Russell was born in Cinderford, Gloucestershire. He was raised in the Forest of Dean and attended East Dean Grammar School where his father (known as "the mathemagician" owing to his facility in complex mental calculation) was headmaster. When he was fifteen the family moved to Bristol and his education continued at Fairfield Grammar School, and then the Engineering faculty of the University of Bristol where he gained a BSc degree in automotive engineering. His first job was maintaining buses for the Bristol Tramways & Carriage Company, one of Sir George White's companies.

== Bristol Aeroplane Company ==
Another of George White's companies was the Bristol Aeroplane Company. Russell joined the company in May 1925, at age 21, as an assistant in the stress office. He met Miss Lorna Mansfield, a secretary at the company, and they were married for over 50 years. One of his first efforts at the company were stress calculations for the Type 99 Badminton, a biplane racer being built for the 1926 King's Cup. The Badminton crashed a month before the race, which gravely concerned Russell until the reason was revealed to be a seized engine. Another early design was the Type 95 Bagshot, a twin-engine monoplane fighter. Russell was invited to take a flight in the Bagshot, and was alarmed to see the wings twisting during control use, a problem that led to the abandoning of the design. He developed a new method of separately calculating bending and torsional stresses, which later led to a new single-spar monoplane wing design that was granted a patent.

Over a short period of time, Chief Designer Frank Barnwell drew Russell closer into the primary design team. He worked on the Type 105 Bulldog, which went on to see production of more than 500 examples. This was followed by another monoplane fighter, the Type 133, but the contract was won by the Gloster Gladiator instead.

In 1935 the first of the RAF Expansion Schemes was launched, and Bristol won two contracts for monoplanes, the Bombay troop-carrier and the Blenheim bomber. Barnwell and his two chief assistants, Leslie Frise and Russell, looked to address the Bagshot's wing problems in the Bombay, and over-designed it to ensure flexing would not be an issue. The design suffered as a result, both overweight and extremely difficult to manufacture. Only 50 were built and saw limited service.

The Blenheim was based on newer designs and was originally built for speed, not utility. It was the result of contest to produce the fastest four-passenger plane in Europe, and therefore did not require the higher weights and ruggedness of the Bombay. It had a much simpler design, but proved just as capable, and was easily adapted into a light bomber. The Blenheim was far more successful than Bombay, with over 1,000 delivered by the start of the Second World War in September 1939.

In August 1938 Barnwell had been killed flying a small aeroplane of his own design. Leslie Frise took over the Chief Designer role, with Russell becoming deputy. They were immediately put to work on a variety of development of the Blenheim, including the Type 152 Beaufort and Type 156 Beaufighter. More than 5,500 Beaufighters were built before the war ended. A final development, the Type 164 "Brigand", was produced only in small numbers before being replaced by the English Electric Canberra.

In 1941 the Air Staff placed a development contract for a long-range, 100 ton, 300 mph heavy bomber with a bomb load of 80,000 lbs. The aircraft was designed to fill Barnes Wallis' concept of the "Victory Bomber", which would drop huge "earth quake bombs" that would destroy dams and other power plants even with a near miss, and thereby render Germany unable to run its industry. Frise and Russell started work on such a design, featuring extensive streamlining for lower drag and better range, powered by eight Centaurus engines, paired to drive four propellers. But before the design had got very far, Wallis had moved onto the idea of a smaller special-purpose bomb that could fill the same role, but would be much smaller. This developed into the famed bouncing bomb carried by the Avro Lancaster.

== Chief Designer ==
In February 1944 this work was able to be re-used when the Brabazon Committee ordered a very large transatlantic airliner to carry 90 passengers for 5,000 miles in 17 hours, all with sleeping accommodation. Frise and Russell had just started work on this adaptation when Frise quit to become Technical Director of Hunting Aircraft. Russell was promoted to Chief Designer in his place. The new design emerged as the Brabazon, but proved to be a commercial failure. Overly large and too slow, it was entering the market just as turboprop and jet engines were coming into the field. BOAC asked for the second prototype to be powered by four Proteus turboprops in place of the eight Centaurus', but this engine would need additional development before it could be fitted and BOAC lost interest in the meantime. The prototype was later cut up after suffering from fatigue cracks in the engine/propeller mounting structures.

While the Brabazon was turning from design to prototype, the company directors asked Russell to start development of a much more modest freighter design. This emerged as the Bristol Freighter in 1945. A small number were sold to a variety of users, and the design was a modest success.

In 1947 Bristol won a design competition for "An airliner to required to carry thirty six passengers on routes to South Africa, Australia and the Far East." The number of passengers, 36, had been set by the capacity of the standard BOAC airport bus. Russell redesigned the plane for 68 passengers instead, producing the Britannia. As development continued, BOAC decided the Proteus was ready for airline use, and asked for development to be switched to this engine. With some additional wing area, this allowed the passenger capacity to be increased to 96 without altering the fuselage.

The first prototype flew in August 1952, but the engines were still not ready for production. The second prototype, with upgraded Proteus III's, flew in December 1953. This example caught fire in February 1954 and had to be ditched. The cause was eventually traced to a failure in the propeller reduction gearing, but did not significantly set back development. However, at this point the de Havilland Comet suffered a series of mysterious crashes, and the ensuing investigation discovered extensive metal fatigue problems. This led to a new requirement that all designs had to undergo extensive water tank testing. After passing these tests, the Proteus engines proved to have icing problems, leading to additional redesigns. By the time the Britannia finally entered service in 1957, the Boeing 707 and Douglas DC-8 were about to enter service, dramatically limiting interest in the Britannia.

In the late 1950s Russell led the design of the Bristol Type 200, a concept that competed with the Hawker Siddeley Trident. Russell felt that British European Airways' (BEA) specification was too small, so the Type 200 was closer in size and range to the Boeing 727, which later sold almost 10 times as well as the Trident. In 1958 BEA selected the Trident and the Type 200 was cancelled.

== Concorde ==
Through the 1950s Russell became increasingly interested in supersonic flight, and was particularly interested in the "breathtaking novelty" of the slender delta wing, which gave good lift at high angle of attack due to the phenomenon of vortex lift. Russell and his team proposed a number of designs using the new wing, eventually leading a number of paper studies for a supersonic transport, starting with the Type 198 in 1961.

The team, led by Bill Strang, Mick Wilde, Doug Thorn and Douglas Vickery, had produced a number of designs when they learned of similar efforts at Sud Aviation under the Super-Caravelle project. Russell developed a friendship with his counterpart at Sud, Louis Giusta, which aided the eventual formation of the Concorde project. Russell became the joint chairman of the Concorde Executive Committee of Directors between 1965 and 1969. Russell was appointed chairman, Filton Division of the British Aircraft Corporation (BAC) in 1968 and retired in 1969. He was also vice-chairman, BAC-Sud Aviation Concorde Committee 1969 to 1970.

Russell won the RAeS British Gold Medal in 1951, was made CBE in 1954, FRS in 1970 and Knighted in 1972. With his wife Lorna he had one son and one daughter. Lorna died in 1984 and Russell married Judy Humphrey in 1986. Archibald Russell died in Angarrack, Cornwall on 29 May 1995, one day short of his 91st birthday.
