= Bill Strang (engineer) =

British aerospace engineer (1921–1999)

Bill Strang CBE FRS FREng FRAeS

Deputy Technical Director, Aircraft Group, British Aerospace
- In office 1978–1983

Personal details
- Born: William John Strang; 29 June 1921 Torquay, Devon, England
- Died: 14 September 1999 (aged 78)

William John Strang (29 June 1921 – 14 September 1999) was a British aerospace engineer, best known for his contributions to the design of a number of British aircraft, including the Concorde.

Strang was Technical Director (Commercial Aircraft) of British Aerospace until he retired in 1983. From 1983 until 1990, he was Chairman of the Civil Aviation Airworthiness Requirements Board. He was appointed a CBE in 1973, and in 1997 he was elected a Fellow of the Royal Academy of Engineering. In 1977, he was appointed a Fellow of the Royal Society.

== Early life and education ==
Strang was born in Torquay, England on 29 June 1921. He was educated at Torquay Grammar School and gained a county scholarship in 1939. He left school to join the Bristol Aeroplane Company at Filton, Bristol, where he worked until 1946. Afterwards he took up his scholarship at King's College London and obtained a first-class honours degree in mathematics and later a PhD.

== Work ==
=== Early years ===
From 1939 to 1946 Strang worked in the Aerodynamics Department of the Bristol Aeroplane Company. Later, he joined the Stress and Project Offices on the Beaufort, Beaufighter, Bristol Buckingham and Brabazon aircraft to work on Bristol gun turrets. He made substantial aerodynamic and structural contributions to the design of the Brabazon.

=== Australia and early interest in supersonic flow ===
In 1948, Strang and his wife, Margaret, moved to Melbourne, Australia to work at the Aircraft Research Laboratory (ARL). He developed his interest in supersonic flight and published several papers on supersonic flow in Proceedings of The Royal Society and in Aeronautical Laboratory reports. Significantly, one of these, ARL Report A.69, was on the gust loading of delta-winged supersonic aircraft.

Strang might well have stayed at the ARL. However, Dr. Archibald Russell went to Australia in 1951 and persuaded Strang to focus on design rather than research, and to return to the United Kingdom (UK) to join Russell's team at Filton.

=== The Britannia years ===
Soon after return to the UK, Strang was placed in charge of the Aerodynamics and Flight Research and Development Departments. In 1955, he was appointed Chief Designer of Bristol Britannia, which was a large aircraft intended for transatlantic service. Only a limited number of Britannias were built, but they proved to be very durable. The Britannia was notable for the first civil use of pure servo-tabs for control surface actuation.

=== Concorde – developing the concept ===
Strang's talents as Chief Designer were quickly recognized. In 1956, he became involved with other projects, including the Bristol Belvedere. In 1956, when the STAC (Supersonic Transport Aircraft Committee) was formed, Strang was a significant force in forming a final conclusion of the feasibility to build a supersonic transport of slender delta-wing platform with aerodynamics based on the separated flow principle developed by Dietrich Kuchemann and others at the Royal Aircraft Establishment during 1950–54.

The Filton team was given partial funding to explore the possibility of creating an aircraft capable of carrying 130 passengers for 3,000 miles (4,800 km) at Mach 2.2, in collaboration with France and/or the United States of America (USA). Filton had already secured a contract for an all-steel supersonic research aircraft, known as the Type 188, which first flew in April 1962. This experience convinced the team that civil supersonic transport should be limited to a speed consistent with the use of aluminum alloys. Strang's earlier research into supersonic flow in Australia was ideal preparation for this work and provided invaluable expertise and management experience for the new tasks related to Concorde.

=== Concorde – Anglo-French collaboration ===
In 1960, Strang was appointed a Director and Chief Engineer (Filton Division) of the Bristol Aeroplane Co. Ltd. In the same year, Strang, together with (Sir) Archibald Russell and Mick Wilde, became involved in discussions with representatives from Sud Aviation, the French aerospace company based in Toulouse, France. The French had been studying a smaller aircraft carrying 60–70 passengers over a range of 1,900 nautical miles (3,500 km), whereas the British team envisaged a much longer transatlantic-range aircraft carrying 130 passengers. These were substantial differences. Nevertheless, collaboration continued with Bill Strang playing a significant role.

By the end of 1961, French and British governments were ready to direct BAC and Sud Aviation to formulate a joint project. These studies, concluded in January 1962, that it was possible to have two aircraft designs with a great degree of commonality in research and development tests, structural components, jigs and tools, and engines. Two general arrangement drawings were submitted, both signed by Strang and his French counterpart, Servanty.

The four men most closely concerned with the joint design discussions were, on the British side, Dr. A. E. Russell (later Sir Archibald Russell), Technical Director of BAC's Filton Division, and Dr. W. J. Strang (Bill Strang), Chief Engineer of Filton Division, and, on the French side, Pierre Satre and Lucien Servanty, Technical Director and Chief Engineer respectively of Sud-Aviation. Each of the four was an aeronautical engineer of international standing.

In October 1962, in a small office in Paris, a final move was made in the protracted negotiations. The project was in danger of getting stuck, and there were important matters that still needed to be resolved. The impasse needed to be overcome, and the solution required the consolidation of a special relationship as well as technical expertise. Bill Strang and Lucien Servanty closeted themselves away for a whole day, with a single draughtsman and drawing board, and with an understanding that they would not emerge until they had reached agreement (and an agreed drawing) of the general arrangement for the long-range and medium-range aircraft. Despite the differences in personality between all parties, their partnership was able to be maintained.

By November 1962, a detailed Anglo-French Governmental Agreement for the development and production of a civil supersonic transport aircraft was signed in London, and there was a supporting agreement between BAC and Sud Aviation. Because Britain, with a French deputy, was to take the lead on the engines, the Bristol Siddeley Olympus, France was to take the lead on the airframe with a British deputy. Thus Servanty was appointed Director of Engineering and Strang his deputy. They worked with a team of six – three British (Mick Wilde, Doug Thorne and Doug Vickery) and three French (Gilbert Cormery, Etienne Fage and Jean Resch).

Fortunately, the French and British teams had separately come to the same general design principles, namely a mainly aluminum alloy structure, which dictated a maximum cruise speed of approximately M=2, and a slender delta-wing plan form based on the separated flow principle. However, there was still a major difference on range, the French proposing a medium-range version and the British a longer transatlantic-range version that resulted in a larger, heavier and more costly aircraft. In this situation, Strang's characteristics were invaluable.

One of his colleagues has said that to work with, and under, Bill Strang was a great privilege. He could quickly distill the essential parts of any problem and come to the right conclusion. Although he was highly efficient, even ruthless, in exposing any flaws in a case, he would do this in the nicest possible way. His decisions and advice were respected by all who came into contact with him, including the French.

By 1964, after discussions with the airlines, although the French team had been allocated the lead on airframe design, Strang and his British colleagues had persuaded them to drop the short-range version and to adopt the longer-range and heavier transatlantic version, which required a 20% increase in wing area. By April 1965, metal was being cut for the prototypes.

=== Concorde flies ===
In spite of all the technical challenges and international debate, after extensive ground testing, the first prototype Concorde, 001, flew on 2 March 1969 at Toulouse and the second, 002, flew on 9 April 1969 from Filton.

In June 1969, both prototypes made their first public appearance at the Paris air show. Later that year, M=1 was reached. The first airline pilots flew it, and government authority was given for three more aircraft.

By November 1970, both prototypes had flown satisfactorily at M=2 and demonstrated that a major design objective had been achieved, but much development remained to be done as the prototypes still required intermediate stops to achieve the normal transatlantic sectors with adequate fuel reserves. At the end of the year, Dr Russell, the original inspiration behind the project (and the one who had persuaded Bill Strang to return from his research in Australia) retired.

In 1971, although the US Congress cancelled the country's supersonic program, four more Concordes plus long-dated materials for a further six were ordered. This faith could be justified because the hundredth flight at M=2 was logged, including some with airline pilots flying, and 001 made an intercontinental flight to Dakar and completed a tour of South America. In December, Concorde 01, ordered at the end of 1969, made its first flight from Filton to Fairford, a very good achievement by Bill Strang and his colleagues.

Given that they were more than doubling the cruising speed of civil aircraft in one step, the Concorde partners continued to make good progress so that, by the end of 1975, Concorde had received both British and French Certificates of Airworthiness and deliveries to airlines had started. The aircraft continued to achieve many notable flights, mostly halving transoceanic flight times, By January 1976, passenger-carrying services were operating.

In recognition of his work on Concorde, Strang was awarded the C.B.E. in 1973 and was elected a Fellow of the Royal Society in 1977, an honour that he greatly valued.

=== Beyond Concorde ===
In 1978, Strang was appointed Deputy Technical Director of the whole of the Aircraft Group, military and civil, of the recently formed British Aerospace, encompassing all significant British fixed-wing aircraft.

In 1983, the Civil Airworthiness Authority appointed him as Chairman of the ARB (Airworthiness Requirements Board), for which he was ideally suited and which they had held open for him for a year (until his retirement). He had been a founder member since 1972 and remained their Chairman until 1990.
