= Bristol Racing Biplane =

Racing Biplane

General information
- Type: Biplane racer
- National origin: United Kingdom
- Manufacturer: British & Colonial Aeroplane Company
- Number built: 1

History
- First flight: 1911

The Bristol Racing Biplane was a British single-seat biplane designed to combine the performance of a monoplane but using the strength of the biplane. It was designed by Robert Grandseigne and Léon Versepuy, who were supervised by George Challenger for the British & Colonial Aeroplane Company of Bristol, it crashed on its first flight.

== Design and development ==
The Racing Biplane, also known as The Racer or Biplane No. 33 from its Bristol sequence number, was powered by a 50 hp (37 kW) Gnome engine driving a four-bladed tractor propeller. It had unequal span wings each with a single steel-tube spar. The rectangular fuselage was a composite structure of wood and steel tubes covered in fabric. It had a twin-skid steel-tube chassis fitted with two wheels on a rubber-sprung cross axle and also had a tail skid, the main skids were long enough to act as brakes on landing. The aircraft was displayed at Olympia in 1911 and was then taken to Larkhill in April 1911 where it was wrecked when it overturned attempting its first flight.

== Specifications ==
Data from Bristol Aircraft since 1910

General characteristics

- Crew: 1
- Length: 25 ft 0 in (7.62 m)
- Wingspan: 27 ft 0 in (8.23 m)
- Wing area: 210 sq ft (20 m^{2})
- Empty weight: 570 lb (259 kg)
- Gross weight: 750 lb (340 kg)
- Powerplant: 1 × Gnome piston engine, 50 hp (37 kW)
- Propellers: 4-bladed

Performance

- Maximum speed: 55 mph (89 km/h, 48 kn)
