= Type 101 =

Type 101 may refer to:

- Bristol Type 101, British fighter aircraft in the 1920s
- Bugatti Type 101, motor car made by Bugatti in 1951/52
- Peugeot Type 101, motor car made by Peugeot in 1909, see List of Peugeot vehicles
