= Bristol Glider =

British two-seat glider, 1910

General information
- Type: Biplane glider
- National origin: United Kingdom
- Manufacturer: British & Colonial Aeroplane Company
- Designer: George Challenger
- Number built: 1

History
- First flight: 17 December 1910

The Bristol Glider was an early British two-seat biplane glider designed in 1910s by George Challenger and built by the British & Colonial Aeroplane Company at Filton Aerodrome, Bristol.

Challenger was chief engineer of the British & Colonial Aeroplane Company and he designed the glider for Sir George White the company founder. White had the glider built to present to the Bristol and West of England Aero Club after he had been elected president of the club in October 1910.

Challenger had previously designed the Bristol Boxkite, strongly influenced by Henri Farman's aircraft, and the Glider followed the same layout. It had a foreplane well ahead of the wings, mounted on wire-braced wooden booms, which also carried the undercarriage of a pair of long skids carrying small wheels. Four booms, tapering together in elevation, carried a single tailplane rather than the pair used by the Boxkite. The foreplane and tailplane moved together to control pitch. A small pair of rudders was mounted between the booms near the tail. Lateral control was by ailerons fitted on the upper wing.

The Glider first flew from the landing ground at Keynsham on 17 December 1910, piloted by Challenger. It was hand-towed into the air and retrieved uphill using a two-wheel dolly. It was damaged in February 1911 and repaired but a more serious accident on 4 September 1911 cost £30 to repair. The Glider survived until 1912 but the final fate is not known. The Glider had been designed to have a 30 hp (22 kW) engine fitted but this was never installed.

== Specifications ==
Data from Bristol Aircraft since 1910

General characteristics

- Crew: two
- Length: 33 ft 10 in (10.32 m)
- Wingspan: 32 ft 4 in (9.86 m)
- Height: 6 ft 8 in (2.03 m)

== See also ==
Related lists

- List of Gliders
