= Bristol Type 101 =

British two-seat fighter prototype

Type 101
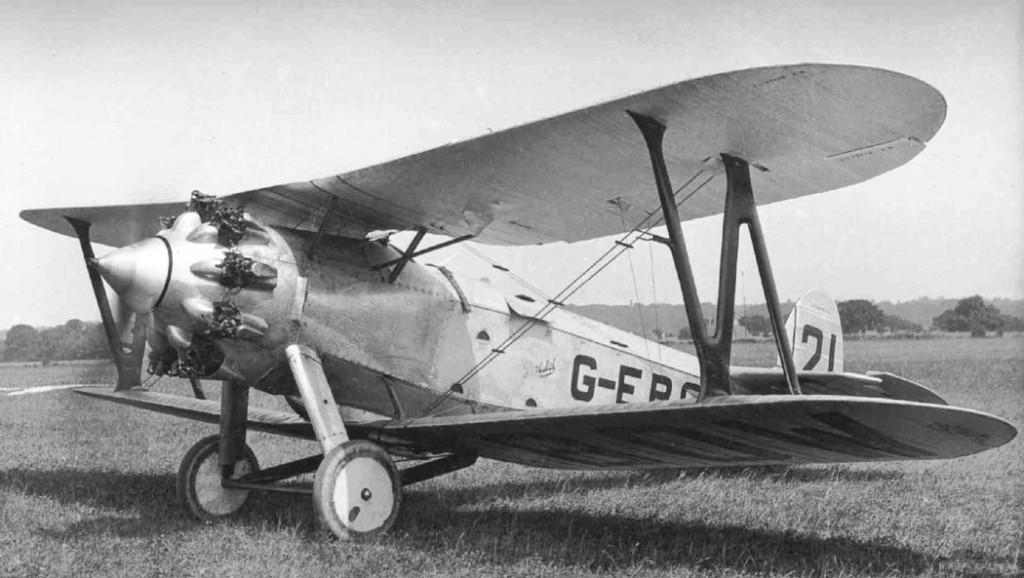

General information
- Type: Fighter
- National origin: United Kingdom
- Manufacturer: Bristol Aeroplane Company
- Designer: Capt. Frank Barnwell
- Number built: 1

History
- First flight: 8 August 1927

The Bristol Type 101, was a British two-seat fighter prototype of the 1920s.

== Development ==
Designed as a private venture, the 101 was a single-bay biplane, two-seat design of mixed construction. The fuselage was a spruce box-girder covered with plywood and the two-spar wings were steel with fabric covering. It was powered by a 450 hp (340 kW) Bristol Jupiter VI, the same engine as the Type 95. Armament consisted of two synchronised .303 in (7.7 mm) Vickers machine guns and a ring-mounted .303 in (7.7 mm) Lewis Gun at the rear.

== Operational history ==
Cleaner and more compact than most aircraft in its class, the 101 displayed relatively high performance when first flown in 1927. However, it was rejected by the Air Ministry due to the use of wood construction, which was seen as out of date. No other buyers could be found and no more aircraft were produced. Continued as a private venture, it first flew at Filton on 8 August 1927, piloted by Cyril Uwins, registered G-EBOW. With the VIA powerplant, Uwins achieved second place in the 1928 King's Cup race at an average speed of 159.9 mph. Subsequently, used as a company hack and as a testbed for the 485 hp Bristol Mercury II nine-cylinder radial, it suffered wing centre section failure on 29 November 1929 while being subjected to engine overspeeding tests, the pilot, C. R. L. Shaw, bailing out successfully. This was the last wooden Bristol fighter built.

== Specifications ==
General characteristics

- Crew: two
- Length: 27 ft 4 in (8.33 m)
- Wingspan: 33 ft 7 in (10.23 m)
- Height: 9 ft 6 in (2.89 m)
- Wing area: 360.00 sq ft (33.44 m^{2})
- Empty weight: 2,100 lb (953 kg)
- Gross weight: 3,540 lb (1,606 kg)
- Powerplant: 1 × Bristol Jupiter VI , 450 hp (336 kW)

Performance

- Maximum speed: 160 mph (257 km/h, 140 kn)

Armament

- 2 × .303 in (7.7 mm) Vickers machine guns
- 1 × .303 in (7.7 mm) Lewis Gun
