= Bristol Type 200 =

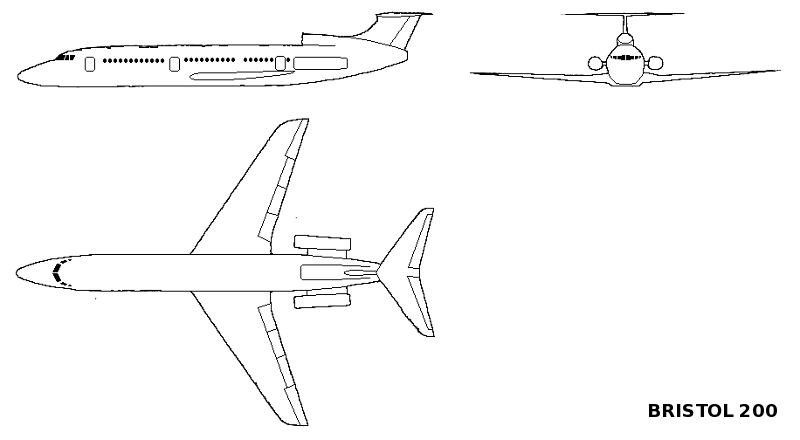
- Bristol Type 200 Concept

General information
- Type: Airliner
- Manufacturer: Bristol Aeroplane Company
- Status: Project cancelled

The Bristol Type 200 was a proposal for a short-range aircraft by the Bristol Aeroplane Company in 1956. Although it was designed in response to a specification issued by British European Airways (BEA), the Type 200 was larger than the airline's requirements and was closer to the Boeing 727 in size and range. The project was cancelled when BEA selected the Hawker Siddeley Trident instead. The Trident went on to have a production run of 117. Along with the Vickers V-1000, it is seen by some as one of the great "what ifs" of British aviation, although it never got beyond the drawing board.

== Development ==
In 1955 BEA issued a specification for an aircraft to replace its Vickers Viscount and Vickers Vanguard turboprop airliners. The airline's requirements were for an aeroplane that could carry a payload of 100 passengers over a range of 1,000 miles (1,600 km). Along with the Bristol Aeroplane Company, de Havilland, Avro and Vickers proposed designs based around BEA's specification, but the B200 was the only Trijet proposal and it won the competition. de Havilland, however, were in trouble after the disasters with their Comet airline but Bristol had a full workload. The British government asked Bristol to share the B200 work with DH and, in return, were promised the government's support on their Type 188 Mach 2 research project.The two companies worked together unhappily for about six months and it was obvious that they were not compatible. The government then required DH to form another company large enough to continue the development without Bristol's involvement. Accordingly, "Airco" was formed by DH with Fairey Aviation and Hunting Aircraft with relative investments of 67%, 22% and 10% respectively

A number of European and American airlines became interested in the aircraft and Boeing were aware of this.

BEA then decided that after all the B200 design was over-large for its needs and requested that the aircraft be scaled down and this smaller version became known as the Trident. Boeing saw this scaling-down as a mistake and took the initiative of developing the Boeing 727 as almost a B200 replica. History recalls that BEA and DH subsequently realised that the scaling-down had been a costly mistake and DH hurriedly set about a "scaling up" exercise to form Tridents 2 and 3 derivatives. But the market had by then been lost to DH and captured by Boeing with large sales for its 727.

The design of the Type 200 was marginally larger than the specifications that were issued by BEA. This reflected the opinion of Archibald Russell (chief designer at Bristol) and his team, who believed that a larger aircraft had better potential in the international market. The Type 200 was close to the Boeing 727 in size and range. The project attracted interest from various European and American airlines, including Pan Am, who invited senior members of the design team to a meeting in the US. Under pressure from the British government to merge with other aerospace companies, Bristol collaborated with Hawker Siddeley on the Type 200, but ultimately in 1958 BEA selected the Trident and the Type 200 was cancelled.

== Design ==
The design had three engines mounted at the rear of the fuselage, one on either side and one in the fin. The empennage was a T-tail arrangement to keep the horizontal stabiliser above the central engine. The Type 200 was the first design to have this T-tail trijet configuration, which was later used successfully on several aircraft.

There was speculation about several engines that might have been used on the aircraft, including the Bristol Orpheus turbojet, The Bristol Olympus, the Rolls-Royce RB.140/RB.141 (Medway) or even Pratt & Whitney's J57.

=== Further development ===
Bristol developed several other concepts based on the Type 200, none of which was ever built. The Type 201 was a long-range version of the aircraft, proposed for BOAC in 1956. The Type 205 was a short-range version with four engines mounted at the rear of the fuselage, similar to the Vickers VC10. The Type 200 and its related developments were later used to contribute to the design of the BAC One-Eleven (along with the Hunting 107 design).

== Specifications ==
Data from Flight International 1958

General characteristics

- Crew: 2-3
- Capacity: 100 seats / 21,000 lb (9,525 kg) payload
- Length: 121 ft 6 in (37.03 m)
- Wingspan: 91 ft (28 m)
- Max takeoff weight: 120,000 lb (54,431 kg)
- Powerplant: 3 × Bristol Orpheus turbojet engines, 4,800 lbf (21 kN) thrust each (Note: Alternative engines: Bristol Olympus or Rolls-Royce RB.140 or Pratt & Whitney J57)

Performance

- Cruise speed: 600 mph (970 km/h, 520 kn) +
- Range: 1,700 mi (2,700 km, 1,500 nmi)
