= Bristol Hydro no.120 =

Hydro no.120

General information
- Type: Seaplane
- National origin: United Kingdom
- Manufacturer: The British & Colonial Aeroplane Co. Ltd
- Designer: Henri Coandă
- Number built: 1

History
- First flight: 15 April 1913

The Hydro no.120 was a Romanian-designed two-seat, single-engine biplane configured as a single-float seaplane. Built by Bristol in 1913, it was lost on its first flight.

== Development ==
The Romanian aircraft designer Henri Coandă joined the British and Colonial Aeroplane Company, as Bristol was then known, in January 1912. The following January, he designed a two-seat, single-engine single-float biplane. It was begun as a private venture but was purchased subject to acceptance trials by the Admiralty. As it turned out, the aircraft did not survive long enough to undertake these trials. It received no Bristol type name at the time and as a pre-First World War type, it did not get a retrospective Type number in 1923. For that reason it is usually referred to by its Bristol construction number, 120, or as the Hydro no.120.

It was a single-bay biplane with unswept and unstaggered wings. The circular-section fuselage was mounted between the wings with a gap below and unusual framed struts above at the centre section. The observer's cockpit was between these frames, the pilot sitting at the wing trailing edge. The 80 hp (60 kW) Gnome rotary engine was enclosed in a close-fitting aluminium cowling. The fuselage tapered to the tail, which in typical Coandă style comprised a nearly semicircular fixed horizontal stabiliser with a single elevator, plus a balanced rudder without a fixed fin. There was a single wide mahogany float built by Oscar Gnosspelius, with a pair of water rudders at its rear. Two streamlined cylindrical wingtip floats provided lateral stability.

No. 120's career was very brief. After several days on the water at Cowes for tests, the Gnosspelius float became waterlogged and heavy. It was therefore replaced by a lightweight, purpose-built Consuta float from Saunders and Company of Cowes. On 15 April 1913, Harry Busteed took off successfully, only for the closely cowled engine to overheat and lose power. The subsequent heavy emergency landing destroyed the float, and the aircraft—though not its pilot—was lost.

== Specifications ==
Data from Barnes (1964) p.84

General characteristics

- Crew: two
- Length: 27 ft 10 in (8.48 m)
- Wingspan: 38 ft 8 in (11.79 m)
- Wing area: 436 sq ft (40.5 m^{2})
- Powerplant: 1 × Gnome 7 Lambda 7-cylinder rotary , 80 hp (60 kW)
