= Bristol Type 159 =

Type 159

General information
- Type: Heavy bomber
- National origin: United Kingdom
- Manufacturer: Bristol Aeroplane Company
- Status: Cancelled project
- Primary user: Royal Air Force
- Number built: None

The Bristol Type 159 was a British design for a four-engined heavy bomber by the Bristol Aeroplane Company, of Filton, Bristol. A mock-up was built but the project was cancelled and no aircraft were built.

== Design and development ==
In March 1939 the British Air Ministry issued specification B.1/39 for a heavy bomber to replace the Avro Manchester, Short Stirling and Handley Page Halifax. Bristol had submitted the Type 159, sometimes known as the Beaubomber which was a low-wing monoplane with a twin tail, using mainly components used by the Bristol Beaufort. It had a nose-wheel landing gear with the 15,000 lb (6,800 kg) bomb-load stored inside the inner wing. Four Hercules engines were the proposed engines that could be swapped for Rolls-Royce Griffons. The crew, apart from the bomb aimer, would be housed in an armoured monocoque structure with a dorsal and a ventral gun turret. The Type 159 and the Handley Page HP.60 design, a variant of the Halifax, were selected and the intention was to order two prototypes of each for evaluation. The Type 159 passed wind-tunnel for stability and low drag and with design well advanced a full-scale mock-up was ready by early 1940.

It was intended to build a half-scale aircraft for flight testing but with the Ministry of Aircraft Production (MAP) concentrating on the production of fighters, further work on the Type 159 was stopped and the mock-up dismantled in May 1940.

== Specifications (Proposed) ==
Data from Bristol Aircraft since 1910

General characteristics

- Crew: seven
- Length: 80 ft 3 in (24.46 m)
- Wingspan: 114 ft 0 in (34.75 m)
- Height: 20 ft 3 in (6.17 m)
- Wing area: 1,800 sq ft (170 m^{2})
- Empty weight: 37,350 lb (16,942 kg)
- Gross weight: 71,000 lb (32,205 kg)
- Powerplant: 4 × Bristol Hercules VII radial piston engine, 1,500 hp (1,100 kW) each

Performance

- Maximum speed: 302 mph (486 km/h, 262 kn)
- Range: 2,500 mi (4,000 km, 2,200 nmi) at 280 mph
- Service ceiling: 25,300 ft (7,700 m)
