= Bristol Type 143 =

Type 143

General information
- Type: Light transport
- Manufacturer: Bristol Aeroplane Company
- Designer: Frank Barnwell
- Number built: 1

History
- First flight: 1936

The Bristol Type 143 was a British twin-engine monoplane aircraft designed by Frank Barnwell of the Bristol Aeroplane Company.

Developed alongside the more famous Bristol Type 142, which was developed into the Blenheim light bomber, it used the same wing design and employed the same advanced (for the day) design features such as stressed skin, flaps, and retractable undercarriage. The engine it was designed to use never entered production and only a single prototype was manufactured,

== Design and development ==
Like the better-known Type 142 the Type 143 arose from the unbuilt Bristol Type 135 proposal for a civil twin-engine light transport aircraft. This was a low-wing twin-engined monoplane, seating six people and a crew of two, first sketched out by Frank Barnwell, with the intention of using the smaller of the two engines then being developed by Roy Fedden, the Aquila I. Although the manufacture of a second Aquila was authorised, nothing was done about the construction of an actual airframe. Meanwhile, in early 1934 Lord Rothermere announced his intention to have 'the fastest civil aircraft in Europe' built for him. Barnwell proposed an aircraft based on the type 135 but using the more powerful Mercury engine in place of the Aquila, and this was accepted by Rothermere, the aircraft being ordered on 26 March 1934 and first flying on 12 April 1935.

The Type 143 was very similar to the Type 135 design, although the cabin was enlarged to seat eight and some detail changes were made to optimise the use of common components with the Type 142: over 70% of components were shared. The prototype 143 was accordingly built alongside the Type 142, receiving the civil registration G-ADEK on 22 March 1935 but had to wait until the end of the year before the engines had completed trials. It was first flown on 20 January 1936 without registration but bearing the mark R 14. Further flying continued at Filton, mainly as a testbed for the Aquila. It was put into storage when Aquila development was abandoned in 1938 and subsequently scrapped.

== Specifications (Type 143) ==
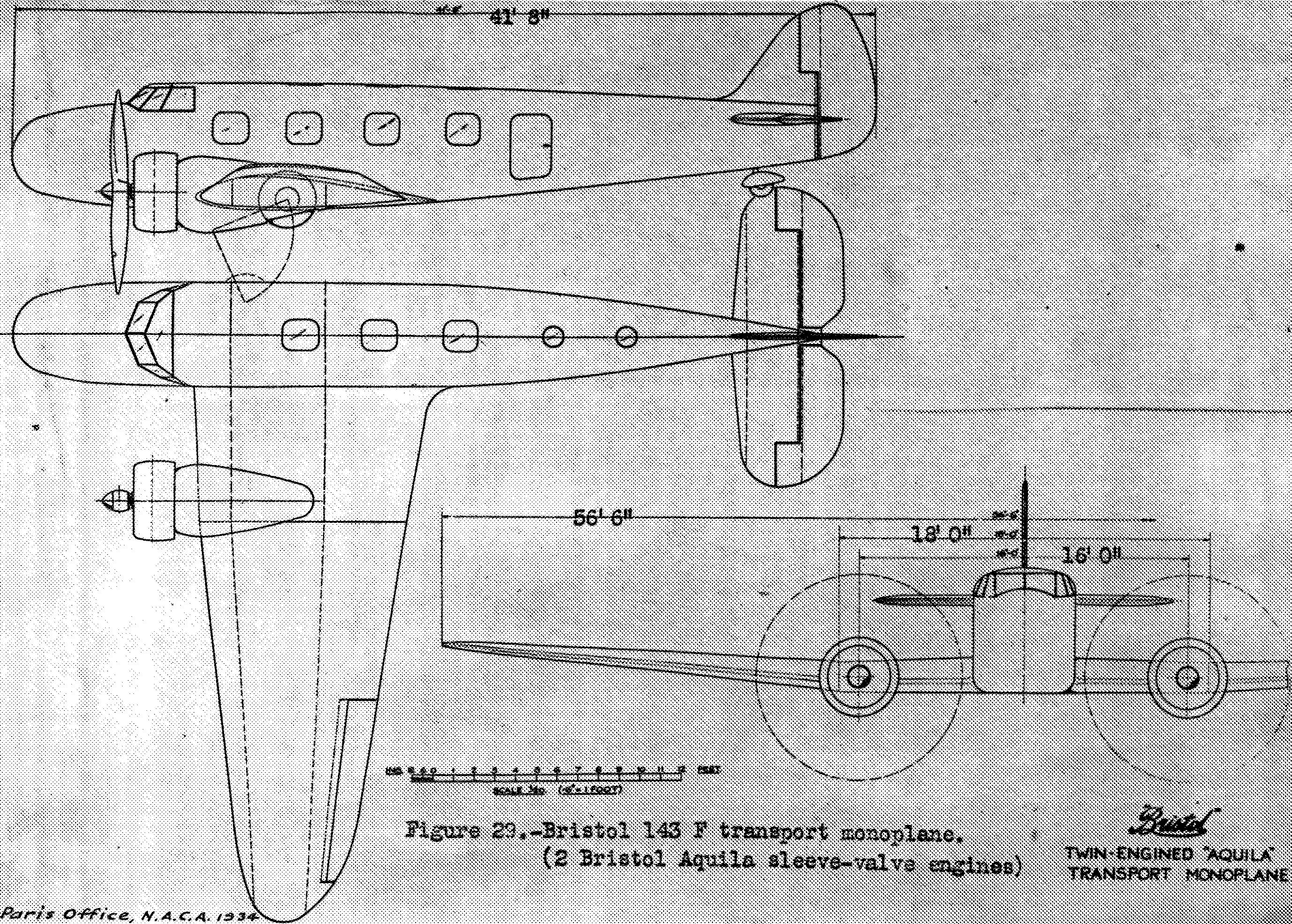
Bristol 143 F 3-view drawing from NACA-SR-26

Data from Bristol Aircraft since 1910

General characteristics

- Crew: 2
- Capacity: 8 passengers
- Length: 43 ft 2 in (13.16 m)
- Wingspan: 56 ft 4 in (17.17 m)
- Height: 12 ft 3 in (3.73 m)
- Wing area: 469 sq ft (43.6 m^{2})
- Empty weight: 7,000 lb (3,175 kg)
- Max takeoff weight: 11,000 lb (4,990 kg)
- Powerplant: 2 × Bristol Aquila I 9-cylinder air-cooled sleeve-valve radial piston engine, 500 hp (370 kW) each
- Propellers: 2-bladed variable-pitch propellers

Performance

- Maximum speed: 250 mph (400 km/h, 220 kn)
- Range: 1,250 mi (2,010 km, 1,090 nmi)

== See also ==
Aircraft of comparable role, configuration, and era

- Airspeed Envoy
- Lockheed Model 10 Electra
