= Bristol Janus =

During World War 2, the Bristol Aero Engine part of the Bristol Aeroplane Company was pre-occupied with developing and manufacturing radial piston engines, such as the Bristol Hercules and the more powerful Bristol Centaurus. However, in 1944 the Company decided to form a Project Department to investigate the design of gas turbines. Initially the department was based at Tockington Manor, a large country house close to the main factory at Patchway, Bristol. A predominantly young team was formed and was initially tasked with studying turboprop engines.

The Ministry of Supply asked BAE for design studies for a 1000 hp turboprop engine.

An early decision taken was to go for a centrifugal compressor configuration, because the engine would be so small that an axial unit would be challenging.

Sufficient overall pressure ratio was obtained by mounting two centrifugal compressors in series on the HP shaft. These were driven by a single stage turbine. Another important decision taken was to opt for a free power turbine. This delivered power to the forward mounted propeller reduction gearbox.

The two centrifugal compressors were mounted back-to-back, the outlet of the first unit being connected to the inlet of the second by four curved pipes. Four highly skewed combustion chambers were located between these pipes and discharged combustion gases into the turbine system located aft. The exhaust pipe was angled downwards. This reference shows an external view of the engine.

At some point the design became known as the Bristol Janus. BAE considered it to be a very compact and light engine

Later the Ministry of Supply asked for the design to be scaled down to an output of 500 hp, to avoid conflict with the projects of other manufacturers.

In the event, the Bristol Janus was never manufactured. However, the Project Department went on to design the Bristol Theseus, which became the first Bristol gas turbine to be actually manufactured and developed. It passed a Type Test and was also flight tested.

== Applications ==
Some version of the Bristol Janus was offered as the powerplant for the twin engined Bristol Type 173, but the prototypes of this helicopter were eventually powered by 550 hp Alvis Leonides 73 air-cooled 9-cylinder radial engines.

== Variants ==
Scaled 500 hp variant

== Specifications (Janus 1) ==
Data from

==== General characteristics ====
- Type: turboprop with free power turbine
- Length:
- Diameter:
- Dry weight:

==== Components ====
- Compressor: double centrifugal with the units mounted in series back-to-back
- Combustors: 4 combustion chambers
- Turbine: single stage axial HP turbine, single stage(?) free power turbine
- Fuel type: Kerosene (R.D.E. / F / KER)

==== Performance ====
- Maximum power output: 1,000 bhp (750 kW)@Sea Level Static, ISA

== See also ==
- List of aircraft engines
