= Bristol-Burney seaplanes =

General information
- Type: Experimental aircraft
- National origin: United Kingdom
- Manufacturer: British and Colonial Aeroplane Company
- Designer: Frank Barnwell

The Bristol-Burney seaplanes were a pair of experimental seaplanes produced by a collaboration between Lt. Dennistoun Burney and the British and Colonial Aeroplane Company during 1912–14. The aircraft, neither of which was successfully flown, featured a novel hydroplane undercarriage. Although not a success, their development was the basis of Burney's later invention of the paravane.

== Background ==
Dennistoun Burney was a naval officer who had become convinced of the possibilities of naval aviation and who had a number of technical ideas on the subject. Wanting to develop these but lacking the technical resources to do so, he approached Bristol who expressed an interest and, having been assured of support from the Admiralty, set up a highly secret separate design office, called the X Department, to develop these at the end of 1911. Frank Barnwell was hired to act as designer, with Clifford Tinson as his assistant. Their first proposal, designated X.1 was an adaptation of a Bristol G.E. 1 biplane. The aircraft was to be supported in the water by five streamlined airbags under the wings but for takeoff used the hydrofoil principle recently pioneered by Enrico Forlanini using three sets of hydrofoils, each consisting of a central leg bearing a stack of lifting planes, an assembly referred to as a "hydroped". In addition to the air propeller the aircraft was to be driven by water propellers for use at take-off, driven via a clutch so they could be disengaged when the aircraft was in flight.

== X.2 ==
This proposal was soon discarded, and Barnwell produced a proposal for a two-seat monoplane with an inflatable wing, using eight tubes of rubberised fabric running spanwise in place of spars. Some experiments were made with this idea, but it proved too heavy to be practical, so the design was modified to use a conventional wing structure with three spars using wing-warping for lateral control mounted on top of the fuselage, which had a rounded boat-like lower section and was planked with mahogany and then covered with varnished sailcloth. This was to function like a flying boat's hull, keeping the aircraft afloat until it was moving fast enough for the hydrofoils to begin providing lift. Two hydropeds angled out from below the leading edge of the wing, each with a water propeller driven by a shaft contained within the leg, and a third hydroped supported the rear fuselage. It was powered by an 80 hp (60 kW) Canton-Unné water-cooled radial engine, driving both air and water propellers via a pair of Hele-Shaw clutches. Dual controls were fitted in the cockpit, in which the crew sat side by side.

The aircraft was completed in May 1912 and taken by boat to Dale in Pembrokeshire for testing by test pilot Howard Pixton. The first trial showed the aircraft to accelerate well under the power of the water propellers, but after a short run the streamlined fairing of the hydropeds was torn away, ending the tests. Subsequent static tests revealed a vibration problem in the drive assembly, and while this was being examined trials were made by towing the aircraft behind a torpedo boat. Problems with stability were partially cured by minor changes to the parafoil lifting planes and the addition of a controllable water elevator and rudder to the aft hydroped, resulting in satisfactory towing characteristics, but when the water propellers were used the torque reaction caused the aircraft to heel over.

In September it was decided to conduct flight trial by towing the aircraft, and the engine was removed and replaced by 500 lb (230 kg) of ballast. On 21 September, towed by a torpedo boat, carrying George Dacre to monitor the instruments: the machine's controls were set for level flight and locked. It lifted off at an airspeed of 30 knots (35 mph; 56 km/h) in a nose-high attitude, stalled, sideslipped and crashed, happily without injuring Dacre.

== X.3 ==
It was not considered worthwhile to repair the X.2, and in March 1913 work on a second machine, given the Bristol sequence number 159. This was slightly larger than the X.2, and had a fuselage was covered in Consuta plywood. The disposition of the water propellers was modified, with the propellers contra-rotating to eliminate torque effects and mounted centrally in tandem. Wing-warping was replaced by ailerons. It was designed to be powered by a 200 hp (150 kW) Canton-Unné water-cooled radial engine loaned by the Admiralty.

Preliminary taxying trials were undertaken with outriggers to support tip floats in place of the wings and with an 80 hp (60 kW) Gnome. These were generally satisfactory, although there was a tendency for the nose to dip when the airscrew was engaged: to counteract this a supplementary front-mounted elevator was added. The Gnome was then replaced by the Canton-Unné and the wings fitted, but before flight testing could begin the aircraft was grounded on a sandbank, necessitating extensive repairs. At this point Bristol asked the Admiralty for more substantial support: this was refused and so the program was abandoned. The X.3 was returned to Filton, where it was eventually scrapped in 1920. Burney was to exploit his experience with the X.2 and X.3 in developing the paravane at HMS Vernon during 1915.

== Specifications (X.3) ==
Data from Barnes 1988 p.90

General characteristics

- Crew: 1
- Capacity: 1
- Length: 36 ft 8 in (11.18 m)
- Wingspan: 57 ft 10 in (17.63 m)
- Wing area: 500 sq ft (46 m^{2})
- Powerplant: 1 × Canton-Unné Water-cooled 9-cylinder radial piston engine, 200 hp (150 kW)
- Propellers: 2-bladed
