= George Henry Challenger =

- Born: 3 June 1881; Neath, Glamorganshire, Wales
- Died: December 1947; Taunton, Somerset, England
- Occupation: Aero-engineer
- Spouse: Emily Beatrice

George Henry Challenger (1881–1947) was a British aviator and aero-engineer, originally with the Bristol Aeroplane Company and later with Vickers. He designed a number of aircraft and held a number of aviation-related patents.

== Early life ==
Challenger was born on 3 June 1881 at Neath in Glamorganshire, Wales. He was originally employed as an engineer at the Bristol Tramways and Carriage Company where his father was chief engineer.

== Bristol ==
With the formation of the British and Colonial Aeroplane Company in 1910 which started with leased premises from the Bristol Tramways and Carriage Company, Challenger moved across to the new aeroplane company as works manager and engineer. With the creation in 1911 of an experimental department, Challenger was sent to Larkhill to learn to fly and on 14 February 1911 he obtained his Royal Aero Club Aviators Certificate (No. 58). Among his designs at Bristol were the Bristol Boxkite and Bristol Glider. He left Bristol to work for the aviation department of Vickers where he was chief designer and engineer.

== Vickers ==
With the formation of an aeronautical division by Vickers Challenger left Bristol to work for the new company. Challenger was involved in numerous patents, including those for a ring mounting and a gun synchroniser, both for machine guns. He left Vickers in 1918
