= Bristol Aeroplane Company =

1910–1959 UK aerospace manufacturer

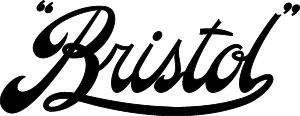
- Industry: Aerospace manufacturer
- Founded: 1910; 116 years ago (as British and Colonial Aircraft Company)
- Founder: Sir George White
- Defunct: 1966; 60 years ago (holding company); 1959; 67 years ago (aircraft production)
- Fate: Split and merged
- Successor: British Aircraft Corporation; Bristol Siddeley
- Headquarters: Filton, United Kingdom
- Key people: Frank Barnwell; Roy Fedden; Leslie Frise; Archibald Russell
- Subsidiaries: Bristol Aero-Engines; Bristol Helicopters (1945–1959); Bristol Cars (1945–1960); Bristol Aerospace (1957–1966)

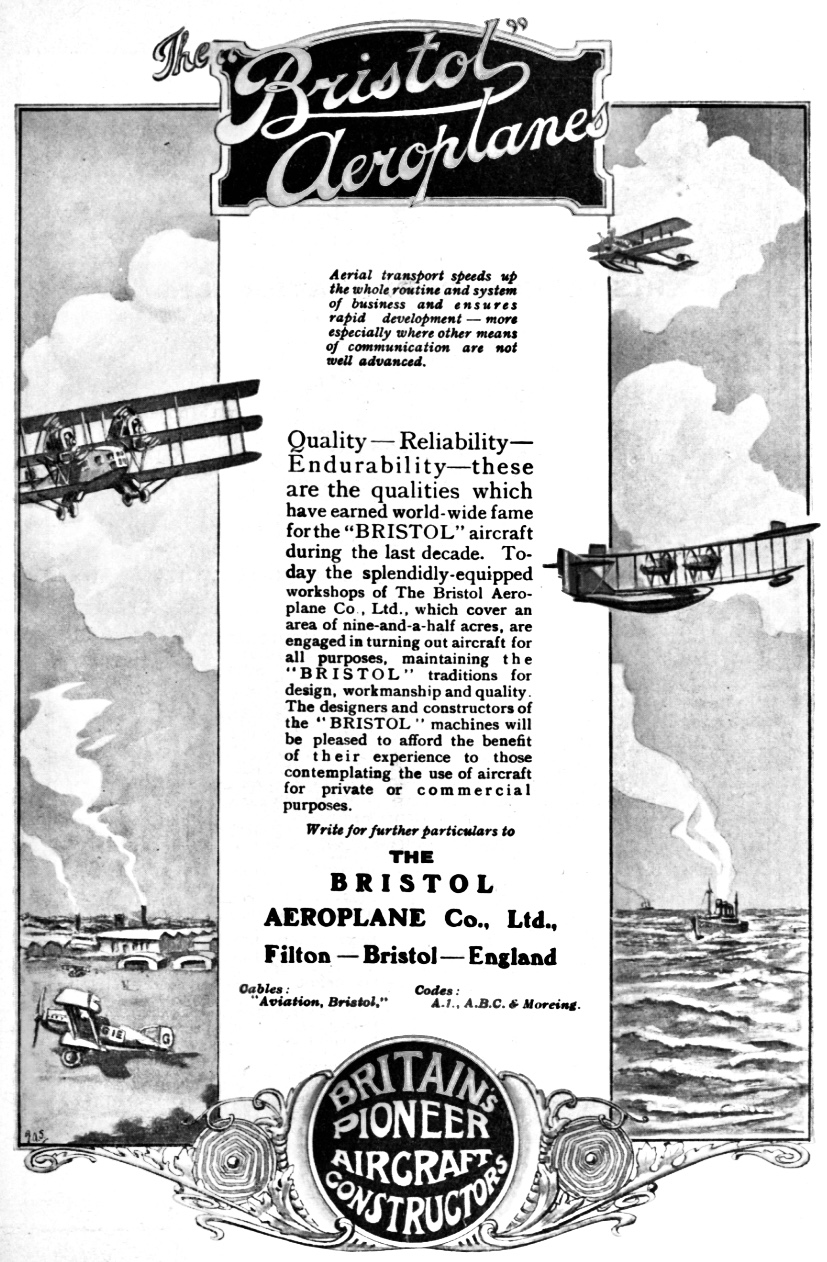
Bristol Aeroplane Company advertisement (1920)

The Bristol Aeroplane Company, originally the British and Colonial Aeroplane Company, was both one of the first and one of the most important British aviation companies, designing and manufacturing both airframes and aircraft engines. Notable aircraft produced by the company include the 'Boxkite', the Bristol Fighter, the Bulldog, the Blenheim, the Beaufighter, and the Britannia, and much of the preliminary work which led to Concorde was carried out by the company. In 1956 its major operations were split into Bristol Aircraft and Bristol Aero Engines.

In 1959, Bristol Aircraft merged with several other major British aircraft companies to form the British Aircraft Corporation (BAC), which subsequently went on to become a founding component of the nationalised British Aerospace, now BAE Systems. Meanwhile Bristol Aero Engines merged with Armstrong Siddeley to form Bristol Siddeley, which was subsequently purchased by Rolls-Royce in 1966, who continued to develop and market Bristol-designed engines.

The Bristol works were at Filton Airport, about 4 miles (6 km) north of Bristol city centre. BAE Systems, Airbus, Rolls-Royce, MBDA and GKN still have a presence at the Filton site where the Bristol Aeroplane Company was located.

== History ==
=== Foundation ===
The British and Colonial Aeroplane Company, Ltd was founded in February 1910 by Sir George White, chairman of the Bristol Tramways and Carriage Company, along with his son Stanley and his brother Samuel, to commercially exploit the fast-growing aviation sector. Sir George met with the American aviation pioneer Wilbur Wright in France in 1909 by chance, during which he became aware of aviation's business potential.

Unlike many aviation companies of the era, which were started by enthusiasts with little financial backing, British and Colonial was well funded from its outset. Sir George chose to establish a separate company from the Bristol Tramway Company, as the venture might be seen as too risky by many shareholders, and the new company's working capital of £25,000 was subscribed entirely by Sir George, his brother, and his son. The affairs of the two companies were closely connected, and the company's first premises were a pair of former tram sheds used for aircraft manufacture at Filton leased from the Bristol Tramway Company. Additionally, key personnel for the new business were recruited from the Bristol Tramway Company, including the chief engineer and works manager, George Challenger.

Flying schools were established at Brooklands, Surrey, which was then the centre of activity for British aviation, where Bristol rented a hangar; and at Larkhill on Salisbury Plain where, in June 1910, a school was established on 2,248 acres (9.10 km^{2}) of land leased from the War Office. By 1914 308 of the 664 Royal Aero Club certificates issued had been earned at the company's schools.

=== The Bristol Boxkite ===
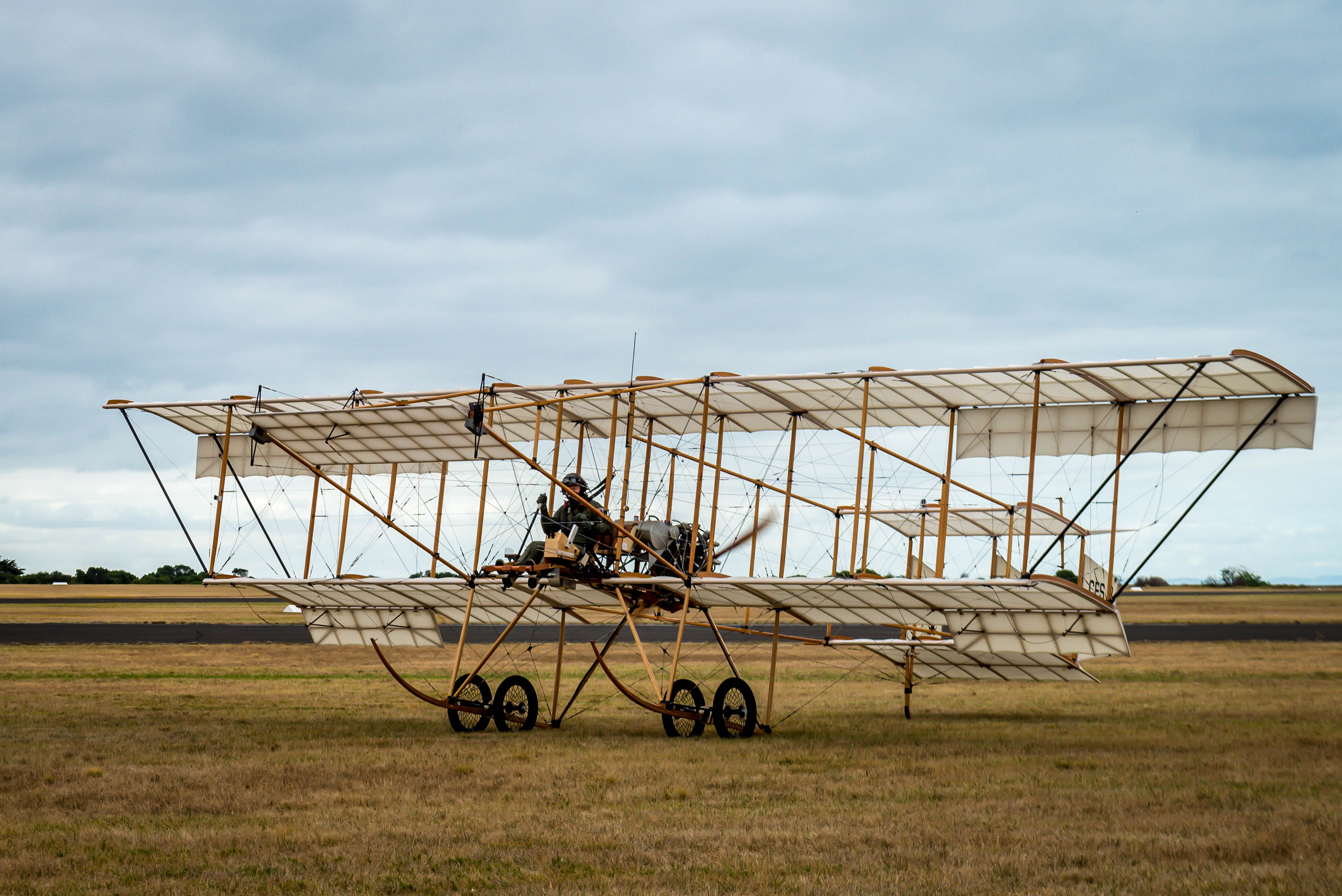
A Bristol Boxkite Replica at RAAF Museum

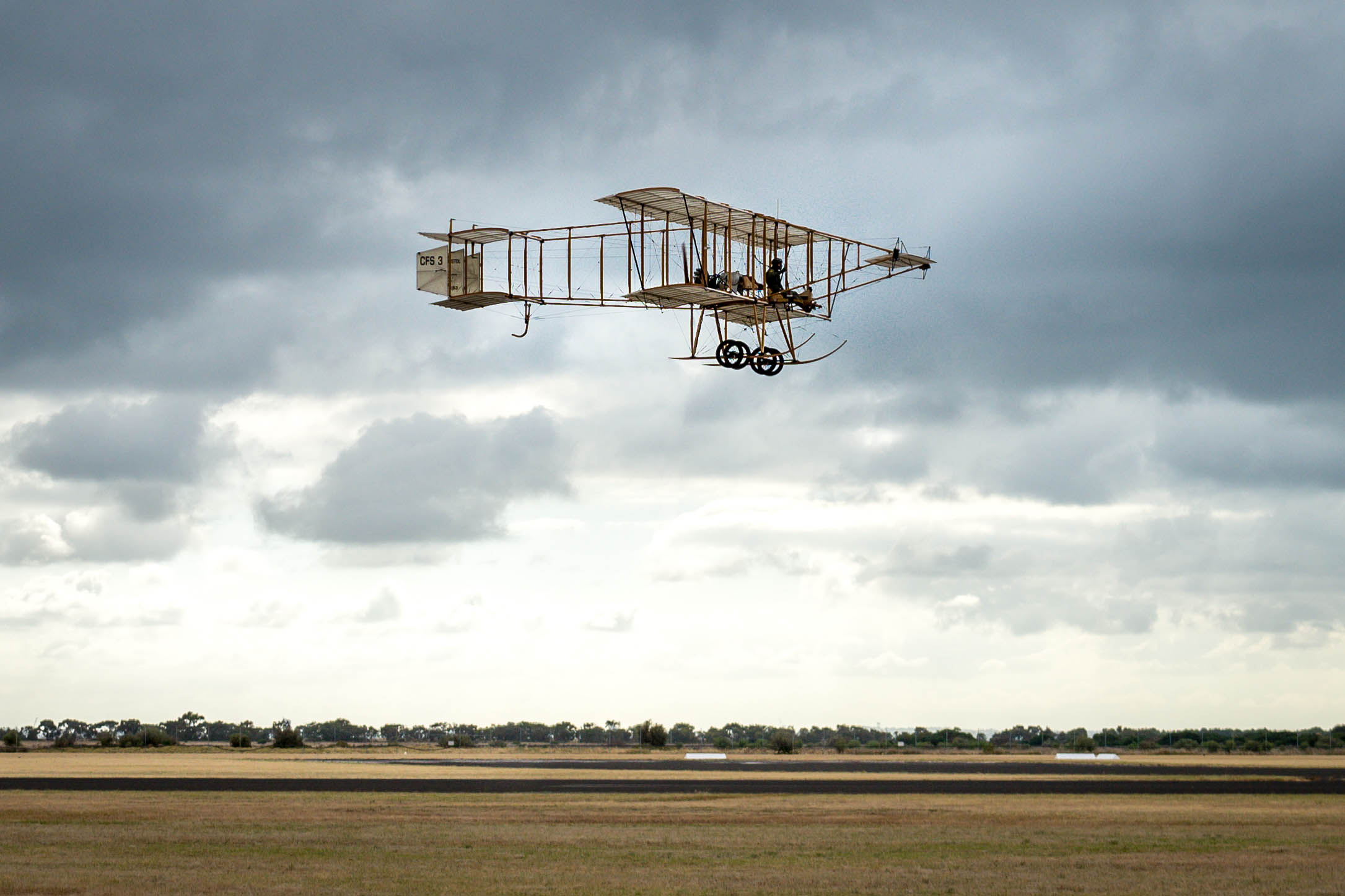
Bristol Boxkite Centenary Flight at RAAF Museum Point Cook, 2014

The company's initial manufacturing venture was to be a licensed and improved version of an aircraft manufactured in France by société Zodiac, a biplane designed by Gabriel Voisin. This aircraft had been exhibited at the Paris Aero Salon in 1909 and Sir George had been impressed by the quality of its construction. Accordingly, a single example was purchased and shipped to England to be shown at the Aero Show at Olympia in March 1910, and construction of five more begun at the company's Filton works. It was then transported to Brooklands for flight trials, where it immediately became apparent that the type had an unsatisfactory wing-section and lacked sufficient power; even though Bristol fitted the aircraft with a new set of wings, it only achieved a single brief hop on 28 May 1910, after which work on the type was abandoned. Since the machine had been sold with a 'guarantee to fly', Sir George succeeded in getting 15,000 francs compensation from Zodiac.

After this failure, the company decided to embark upon designing its own aircraft to serve as a successor. Drawings were prepared by George Challenger for an aircraft based on a successful design by Henri Farman whose dimensions had been published in the aeronautical press. These drawings were produced in little over a week, and Sir George promptly authorised the construction of twenty examples. The first aircraft to be completed was taken to Larkhill for flight trials, where it performed its first flight on 20 July 1910, piloted by Maurice Edmonds. The aircraft proved entirely satisfactory during flight tests.

The first batch equipped the two training schools, as well as serving as demonstration machines; the aircraft, which gained the nickname of the Boxkite, went on to become a commercial success, a total of 76 being constructed. Many served in the company's flying schools and examples were sold to the War Office as well as a number of foreign governments.

=== 1911–1914 ===
Although satisfactory by the standards of the day, the Boxkite was not capable of much further development and work soon was started on two new designs, a small tractor configuration biplane and a monoplane. Both of these were exhibited at the 1911 Aero Show at Olympia but neither was flown successfully. At this time, both Challenger and Low left the company to join the newly established aircraft division of the armament firm Vickers. Their place was taken by Pierre Prier, the former chief instructor at the Blériot flying school at Hendon: he was later joined by Gordon England. In January 1912 Romanian aircraft engineer Henri Coandă was appointed as the company's chief designer.

During early 1912 a highly secret separate design office, known as the "X-Department", was set up to work on Dennistoun Burney's ideas for naval aircraft. Frank Barnwell was taken on as the design engineer for this project, and took over as Bristol's chief designer when Coandă left the company in October 1914. Barnwell went on to become one of the world's foremost aeronautical engineers, and worked for the company until his death in 1938.

The company expanded rapidly, establishing a second factory at the Brislington tramway works; the firm employed a total of 200 people by the outbreak of the First World War.

=== First World War ===
At the outbreak of war in August 1914, Britain's military forces possessed just over a hundred aircraft and the Royal Flying Corps (RFC) consisted of only seven squadrons equipped with a miscellany of aircraft types, none of them armed. Official War Office policy was to purchase only aircraft designed by the Royal Aircraft Establishment (RAE), and Bristol had already built a number of their B.E.2 two-seater reconnaissance aircraft. However, pressure from the pilots of the RFC and Royal Naval Air Service (RNAS) led to orders being placed for a new aircraft manufactured by Bristol, known as the Scout.

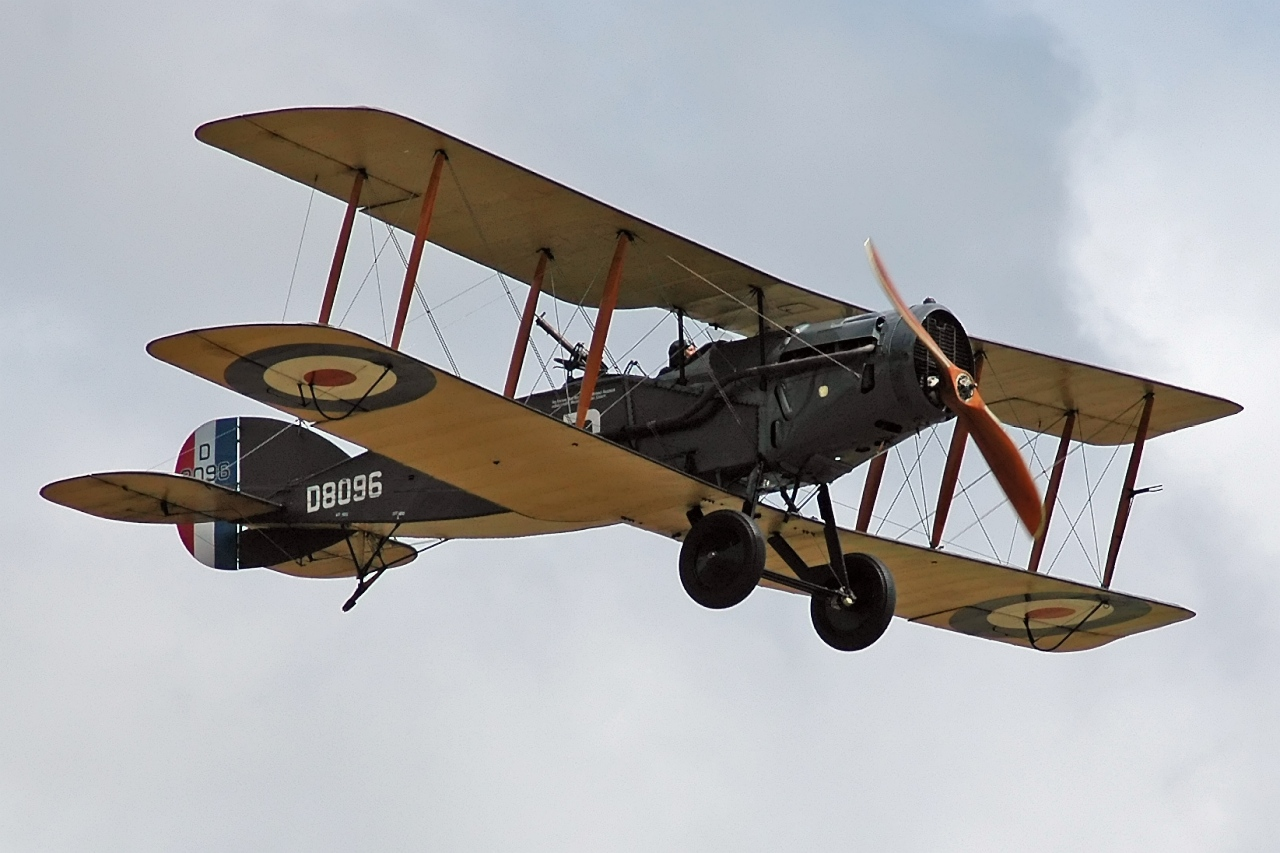
The Bristol Fighter

In 1915, Barnwell returned from France, his skills as pilot being considered to be of much less value than his ability as a designer. At this time Leslie Frise, newly graduated from Bristol University's engineering department, was recruited by Barnwell. In 1916, the company's founder Sir George died; he was succeeded in managing the company by his son Stanley.

The first project that was worked on by Barnwell after his return, the Bristol T.T.A., was designed in response to a War Office requirement for a two-seat fighter intended to conduct home defence operations against Zeppelin raids. This was not successful but, in 1916, work was started on the Bristol F.2A, which was developed into the highly successful F.2B Fighter, one of the outstanding aircraft of the 1914–18 war and a mainstay of the RAF during the 1920s. More than 5,300 of the type were produced and the Fighter remained in service until 1931.

Another aircraft designed at this time was the Bristol Monoplane Scout. Although popular with pilots, the success of this aircraft was limited by War Office prejudice against monoplanes and only 130 were built. It was considered that its relatively high landing speed of 50 mph made it unsuitable for use under the field conditions of the Western Front, and the type's active service was limited to the Near East.

=== Inter-war years ===
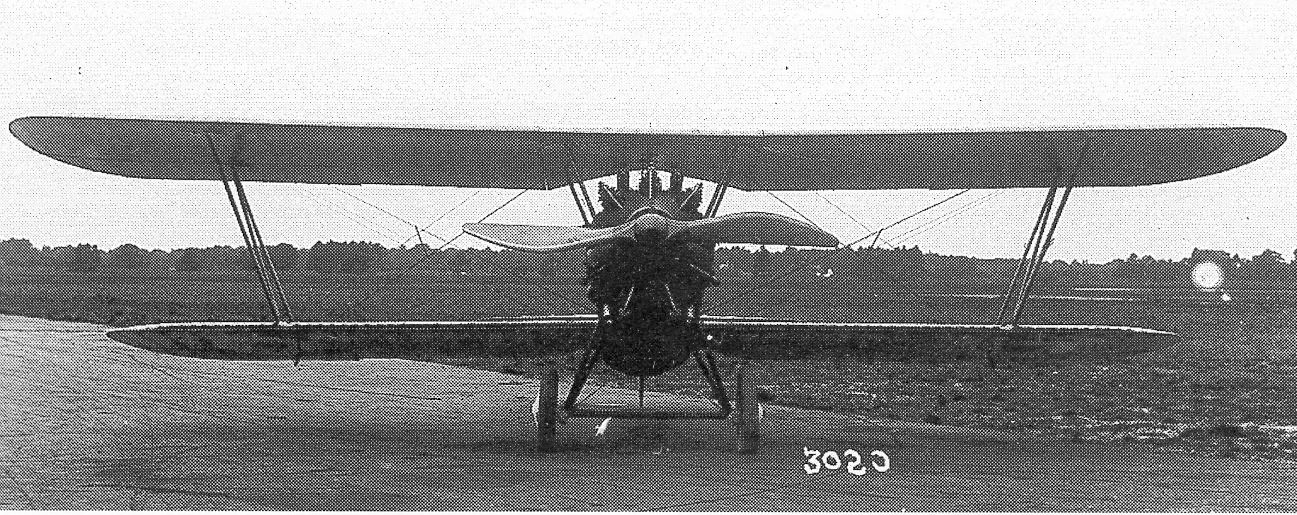
The Bristol Badger

By the end of the war, the company employed over 3,000 at its production works, which were split between Filton and Brislington. Its products had always been referred to by the name 'Bristol' and this was formalized in 1920, when British and Colonial was liquidated and its assets transferred to the Bristol Aeroplane Company, Ltd. During this time the company, acting under pressure from the Air Ministry, bought the aero-engine division of the bankrupt Cosmos Engineering Company, based in the Bristol suburb of Fishponds, to form the nucleus of a new aero-engine operation.

There was already a good working relationship between Bristol Aircraft and Cosmos, the Cosmos Jupiter having been first flown in a prototype Bristol Badger in May 1919. For £15,000 Bristol got the Cosmos design team, headed by Roy Fedden, along with a small number of completed engines and tooling. Although it was to be several years before Bristol showed any profit from the aero engine division, the Jupiter engine eventually proved enormously successful; indeed, during the inter-war period, the aero-engine division was more successful than the parent company and Bristol came to dominate the market for air-cooled radial engines. Apart from providing engines for almost all Bristol's aircraft designs, the Jupiter and its successors powered an enormous number of aircraft built by other manufacturers.

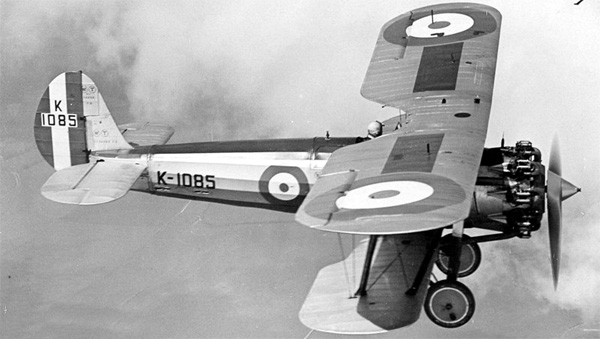
The Bristol Bulldog

Bristol's most successful aircraft during this period was the Bristol Bulldog fighter, which formed the mainstay of Royal Air Force (RAF) fighter force between 1930 and 1937, when the Bulldog was retired from front line service. Since the Bulldog had started life as a private venture rather than an Air Ministry-sponsored prototype it could be sold to other countries, and Bulldogs were exported to, among others, Denmark, Estonia, Finland, and Australia.

During this time, Bristol was noted for its preference for steel airframes, using members built up from high-tensile steel strip rolled into flanged sections rather than the light alloys more generally used in aircraft construction. On 15 June 1935, the Bristol Aeroplane Company became a public limited company. By this time, the company had a payroll of 4,200, mostly in the engine factory, and was well positioned to take advantage of the huge re-armament ordered by the British Government in May of that year. Bristol's most important contribution to the expansion of the RAF at this time was the Blenheim light bomber.

In August 1938, Frank Barnwell was killed flying a light aircraft of his own design; Barnwell was succeeded as Bristol's Chief Designer by Leslie Frise. By the time war broke out in 1939, the Bristol works at Filton were the largest single aircraft manufacturing unit in the world, with a floor area of nearly 25 hectares (2,691,000 square feet).

=== Second World War ===
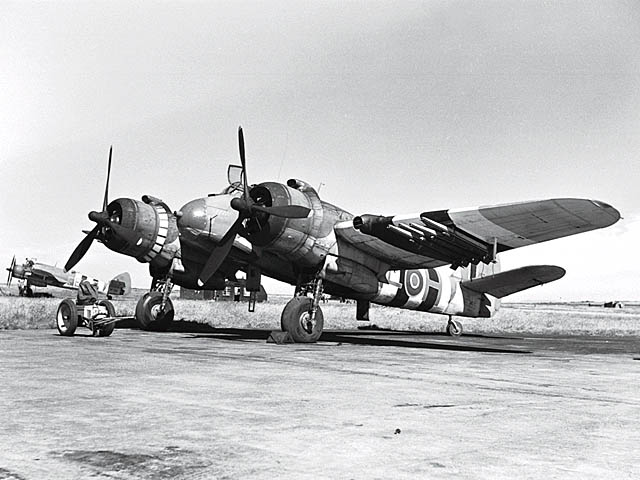
The Bristol Beaufighter

During the Second World War, Bristol's most important aircraft was the Beaufighter heavy two-seat multirole aircraft, a long-range fighter, night fighter, ground attack aircraft and torpedo bomber. The type was used extensively by the RAF, other Empire air forces and by the USAAF. The Beaufighter was derived from the Beaufort torpedo bomber, itself a derivative of the Blenheim.

In 1940, shadow factories were set up at Weston-super-Mare for the production of Beaufighters, and underground at Hawthorn, near Corsham, Wiltshire, for engine manufacture. Construction in the former stone quarry at Hawthorn took longer than expected and little production was achieved before the site closed in 1945. The company's war-time headquarters was located in the Royal West of England Academy, Clifton, Bristol.

=== Post-war ===
When the war ended, Bristol set up a separate helicopter division in the Weston-super-Mare factory, under helicopter pioneer Raoul Hafner. This facility was taken over by Westland in 1960.

Other post-war projects included Bristol Cars, which used pre-war BMW designs as the basis for the Bristol 400. Vehicle production was conducted at Patchway, Bristol.

The engine developed for the Bristol 400 found its way into many successful motor cars manufactured by other companies, such as Cooper, Frazer Nash and AC and, in 1954 and 1955, powered the Bristol 450 sports prototype to class victories in the 24 Hours of Le Mans race. In 1953, S.H. Arnolt, a US car dealer who sold British sports cars, commissioned the Bristol Car Division to build a sports car for the US market, called the Arnolt-Bristol. It is estimated that about 177 were built before production ceased in 1958.

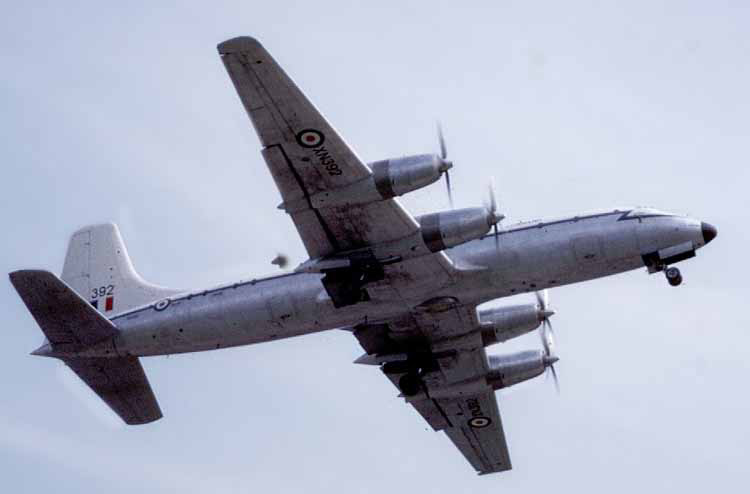
The Bristol Britannia

In 1960, the founder's grandson, Sir George S.M. White, (3rd Baronet), was instrumental in preventing the car division being lost during the wider company's merger with BAC. Accordingly, Bristol Cars Limited was formed, and remained within the Filton complex. Sir George retired in 1973 and Tony Crook purchased his share, becoming sole proprietor and managing director. Pre-fabricated buildings, marine craft and plastic and composite materials were also amongst the company's early post-war activities; these side-ventures were independently sold off.

Bristol was involved in the post-war renaissance of British civilian aircraft, which was largely inspired by the Brabazon Committee report of 1943–5. In 1949, the Brabazon airliner prototype, at the time one of the largest aircraft in the world, first flew. This project was deemed to be a step in the wrong direction, gaining little interest from military or civilian operators, resulting in the Brabazon being ultimately cancelled in 1953. At the same time as the termination, Bristol decided to focus on development of a large turboprop-powered airliner, known as the Britannia. Capable of traversing transatlantic routes, it proved a commercial success; both it and the Bristol Type 170 Freighter were produced in quantity during the 1950s. However, sales of the Britannia were poor and only 82 were built, primarily due to its protracted development; having been ordered by BOAC on 28 July 1949 and first flown on 16 August 1952, it did not enter service until 1 February 1957. Bristol was also involved in helicopter development, with the Belvedere and Sycamore going into quantity production.

Another post-war activity was missile development, culminating in the production of the Bloodhound anti-aircraft missile. Upon introduction, the Bloodhound was the RAF's only long range transportable surface-to-air missile. Bristol Aero Engines produced a range of rocket motors and ramjets for missile propulsion. The guided weapons division eventually became part of MBDA.

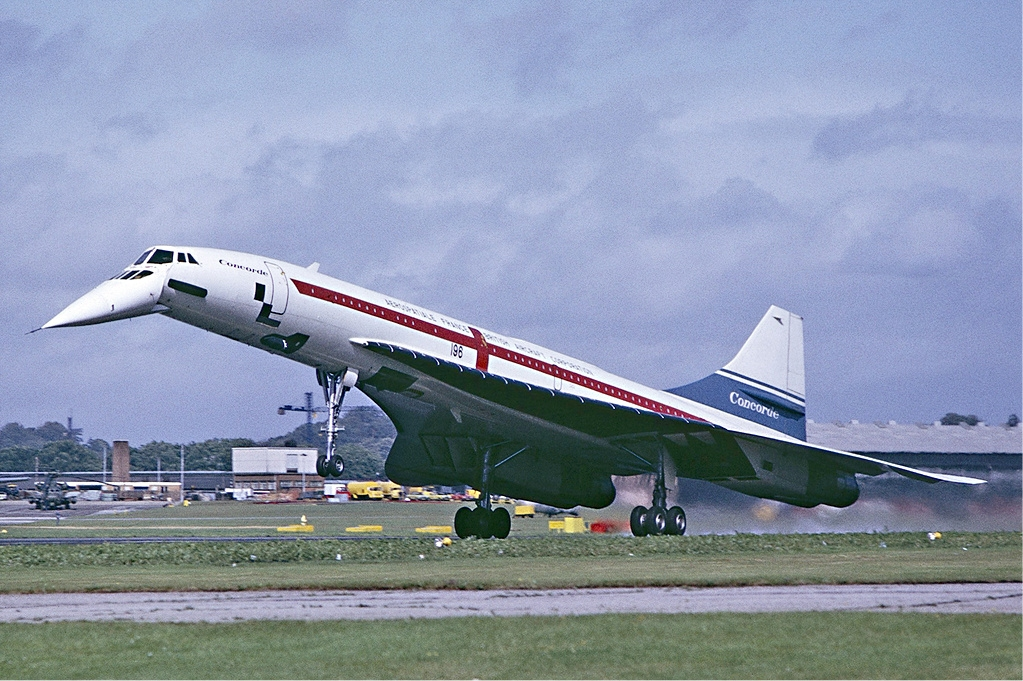
Concorde, originated from the Bristol 223 project study

In the late 1950s, the company undertook supersonic transport (SST) project studies, the Type 223, which were later to contribute to Concorde. A research aircraft, the Type 188, was constructed in the 1950s to test the feasibility of stainless steel as a material in a Mach 2.0 airframe. By the time the aircraft flew in 1962, the company was already part of BAC.

In parallel with these supersonic studies, several subsonic designs were schemed in this period, including the Type 200 (a competitor of the Hawker Siddeley Trident) and its derivatives, the Type 201 and Type 205. None of these designs were built.

=== Merger into BAC ===
In 1959, Bristol was forced by Government policy to merge its aircraft interests with English Electric, Hunting Aircraft, and Vickers-Armstrongs to form the British Aircraft Corporation (BAC). Bristol formed a holding company which held a 20 per cent share of BAC, while English Electric and Vickers held 40 per cent each.

In 1966, the Bristol holding company which held 20 per cent of BAC and 50 per cent of Bristol Siddeley engines was acquired by Rolls-Royce. Bristol also had the following holdings and subsidiary companies at this time:- Bristol Aerojet (50 per cent) – Bristol Aeroplane Co Australia – Bristol DE Mexico SA (78 per cent) – Motores Bristol De Cuba SA – Bristol Aeroplane Co of Canada – Bristol Aero Industries Ltd – Bristol Aeroplane Co USA – Spartan Air Services Ltd (46.5 per cent) – Bristol Aeroplane Co New Zealand – Bristol Aircraft Services Ltd – Bristol Aeroplane Plastics Ltd – SECA (30 per cent) – Short Bros & Harland (15.25 per cent) – SVENSK-ENGELSK Aero Service AB – TABSA (25 per cent) – Westland Aircraft Ltd (10 per cent).

=== The Bristol Aeroplane Company of Canada ===
The Canadian Bristol group of companies was the largest of the overseas subsidiaries. The group undertook aircraft handling and servicing at Dorval Airport, Montreal. Vancouver Airport was the base for Bristol Aero Engines (Western), Ltd., one of the Canadian company's four operating subsidiaries. Work at Vancouver included the overhaul of Pratt and Whitney and Wright engines for the R.C.A.F. and commercial operators. Bristol Aircraft (Western), Ltd (Stevenson Field, Winnipeg) was formerly MacDonald Brothers Aircraft, and was the largest of the subsidiaries and the group's only airframe plant. Bristol de Mexico, S.A. de CV. (Central Airport, Mexico City), overhauled piston engines for South American operators. Bristol de Mexico S.A. obtained a license to manufacture Alfred Herbert Ltd machine tools in 1963 and commenced assembling their centre lathes in 1963. They also commenced building their own design of small engine lathes for the Mexican Government to be installed in training schools throughout Mexico. Malcolm Roebuck was hired from Alfred Herbert Ltd along with William Walford Webb Woodward to supervise this project.

=== Nationalisation ===
In 1977, BAC was nationalised, along with Scottish Aviation and Hawker Siddeley, to form British Aerospace (BAe), which later became part of the now-privatised BAE Systems. The Canadian unit was acquired by Rolls-Royce Holdings and sold in 1997 to current owner Magellan Aerospace.

== Archives ==
A small number of records from the early history of this company are held within the papers of Sir George White at Bristol Archives (Ref. 35810/GW/T) (online catalogue). Other records at Bristol Record Office include the papers of Lionel Harris, an engineer at the Bristol Aeroplane Company in the 1940s (Ref. 42794) (online catalogue)

== Bristol Engine Company ==
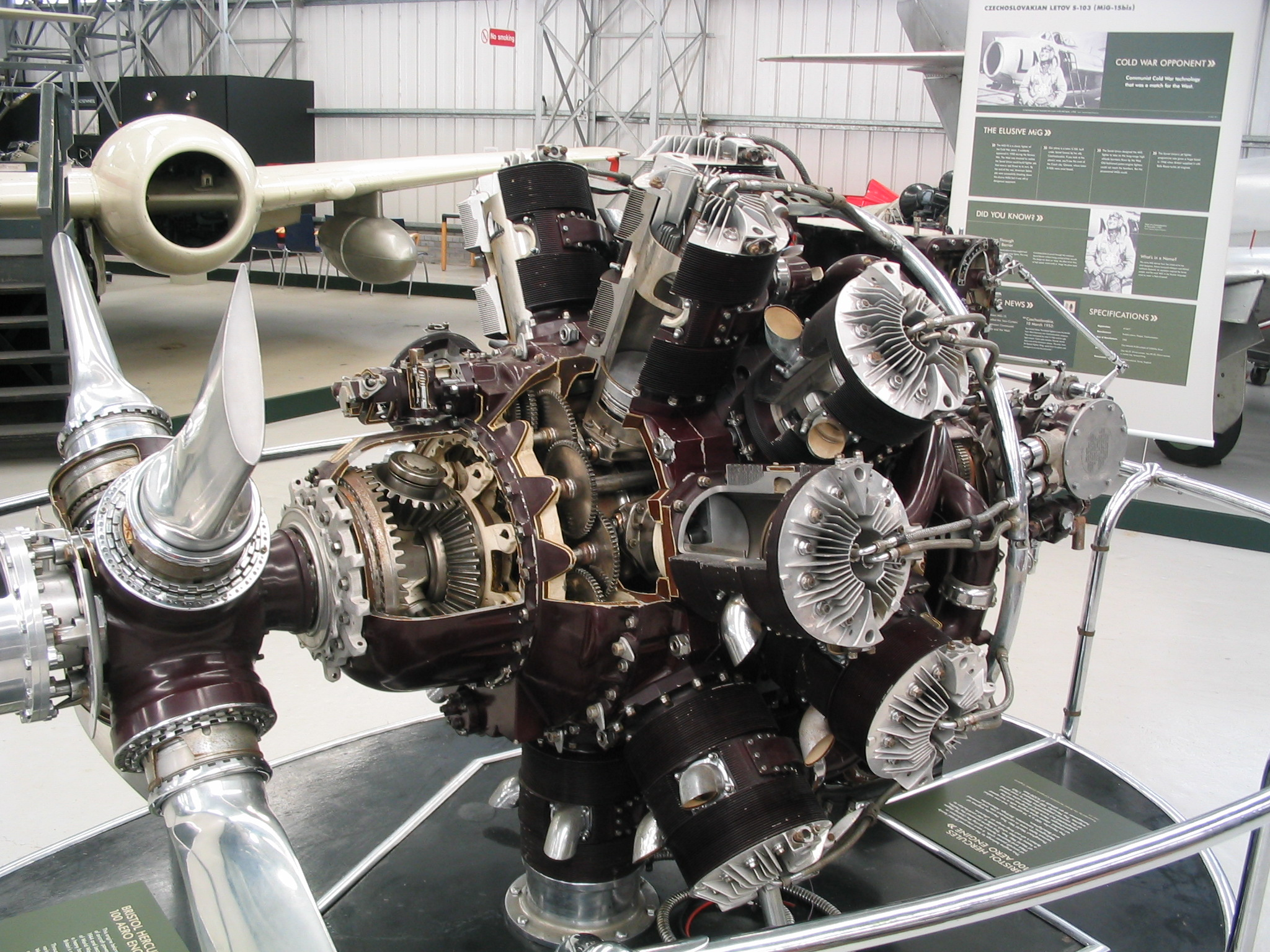
The Bristol Hercules

The Bristol Engine Company was originally a separate entity, Cosmos Engineering, formed from the pre-First World War automobile company Brazil-Straker. In 1917, Cosmos was asked to investigate air-cooled radial engines and, under Roy Fedden, produced what became the Cosmos Mercury, a 14-cylinder two-row (helical) radial, which they launched in 1918. This engine saw little use but the simpler nine-cylinder version known as the Bristol Jupiter was clearly a winning design.

With the post-war rapid contraction of military orders, Cosmos Engineering went bankrupt and the Air Ministry let it be known that it would be a good idea if the Bristol Aeroplane Company purchased it. The Jupiter competed with the Armstrong Siddeley Jaguar through the 1920s but Bristol put more effort into their design and, by 1929, the Jupiter was clearly superior. In the 1930s, and led by Roy Fedden, the company developed the new Bristol Perseus line of radials based on the sleeve valve principle, which developed into some of the most powerful piston engines in the world and continued to be sold into the 1960s.

In 1956, the division was renamed Bristol Aero Engines and then merged with Armstrong Siddeley in 1958 to form Bristol Siddeley as a counterpart of the airframe-producing company mergers that formed BAC. Bristol retained a 50% share of the new company, with Hawker Siddeley group holding the other 50%. In 1966, Bristol Siddeley was purchased by Rolls-Royce, leaving the latter as the only major aero-engine company in Britain. From 1967, Bristol Siddeley's operations became the "Bristol Engine Division" and the "Small Engine Division" of Rolls-Royce, identified separately from Rolls-Royce's existing "Aero Engine Division". A number of Bristol Siddeley engines continued to be developed under Rolls-Royce including the Olympus turbojet – including the joint development Bristol started with Snecma for Concorde – and the Pegasus. The astronomical names favoured by Bristol indicated their heritage in a Rolls-Royce lineup named after British rivers.

== Helicopter Division ==
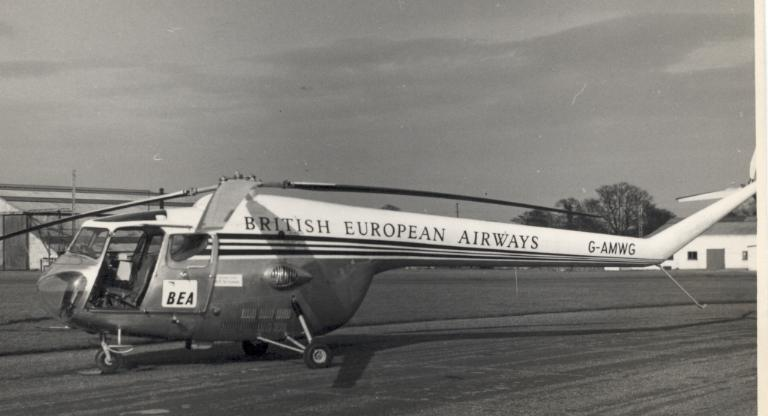
The Bristol 171

The Bristol Aeroplane Company's Helicopter Division had its roots in 1944, when the helicopter designer Raoul Hafner, released from the Airborne Forces Experimental Establishment (AFEE), came to Bristol along with some members of his team. Under Hafner's direction, the division produced two successful designs that were sold in quantity. The first, designated the Type 171, had a shaky start after the wooden rotor blades of the second prototype failed on its first flight in 1949. Nevertheless, the Type 171, called Sycamore in military service, was sold to air forces around the world and 178 were built in total.

After the Type 171, the Bristol Helicopter Division started work on a tandem rotor civil helicopter. The result was the 13-seat Type 173, which made its first flight in Filton in 1952. Five examples were built for evaluation purposes. Although no airlines ordered the Type 173, it led to military designs, of which the Type 192 went into service with the RAF as the Belvedere. First flying in 1958, 26 were built in total.

Pursuing the idea of a civil tandem rotor helicopter, Hafner and his team developed a much larger design, the Type 194. This was in an advanced state of design when the Bristol Helicopter Division was merged, as a result of government influence, with the helicopter interests of other British aircraft manufacturers (Westland, Fairey and Saunders-Roe) to form Westland Helicopters in 1960. When the competing Westland Westminster was cancelled, the management of the combined company allowed development of the Type 194 to continue, but it too failed to find a market.

The Helicopter Division started out at the main Bristol Aeroplane Company site in Filton, but from 1955 it was moved to the Oldmixon factory in Weston-Super-Mare, which had built Blenheims during the War. The factory is now the site of The Helicopter Museum.

== Products ==
Bristol did not systematically assign project type numbers until 1923, starting with the Type 90 Berkeley. In that year, they also retrospectively assigned type numbers in chronological order to all projects, built or not, from August 1914 onwards. Thus the Scouts A and B did not get a type number but the Scout C did and was the Type 1. The final Bristol project, numbered Type 225, was an unbuilt 1962 STOL transport. Of these 225 Types, 117 were built. This list does not include the unbuilt "paper aeroplanes"; it does include the pre-August 1914 aircraft.

=== Aircraft ===
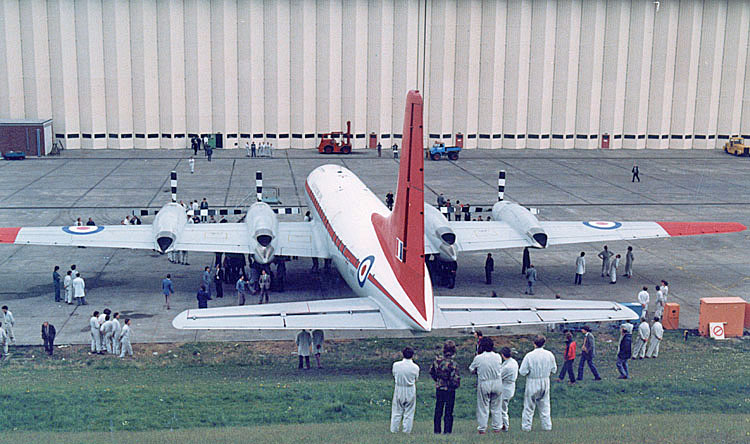
UK Ministry of Defence Bristol Britannia makes a visit to the maker's factory at Filton in 1983. As a civil airliner it had flown for BOAC, British Eagle, and Air Spain.

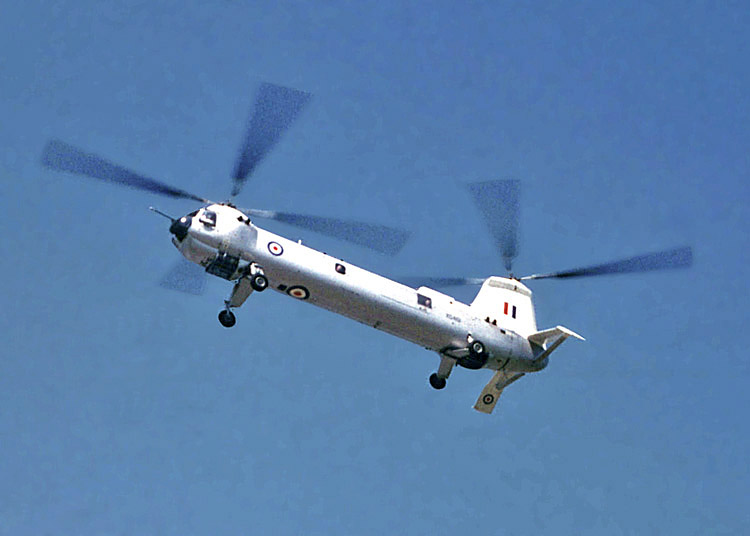
The Bristol Belvedere twin-rotor helicopter, designed as a general-purpose land-based helicopter for the Royal Air Force. Twenty-six were built.

==== Pre-World War I ====
- Bristol Boxkite
- Bristol Glider
- Bristol Racing Biplane
- Bristol Biplane Type 'T'
- Bristol Monoplane
- Bristol Prier monoplane - monoplanes designed by Pierre Prier
- Bristol-Burney seaplanes - hydroplanes built to ideas by Dennistoun Burney
- Bristol Coanda Monoplanes -series of monoplane trainers designed by Henri Coanda from 1912
- Bristol Gordon England biplanes - series of biplane designed by Eric Gordon England from 1912
- Bristol B.R.7
- Bristol Hydro no.120
- Bristol G.B.75 - derivative of TB.8 for Romania
- Bristol T.B.8 - derivative of Bristol Coanda Monoplane as biplane
- Bristol P.B.8
- Bristol S.S.A. - armoured biplane scout for France, first flight 1914, one built

==== World War I ====
- Bristol Types 1–5 Scout A-D
- Bristol Type 6 T.T.A.
- Bristol Type 7 F.3A
- Bristol Type 8 S.2A
- Bristol Types 10, 11, 20, and 77 M.1 Monoplane Scout
- Bristol Types 12, 14–17, and 22 F.2 Fighter
- Bristol Type 13 M.R.1
- Bristol Type 18 Scout E
- Bristol Type 21 Scout F

==== Inter-war ====
- Bristol Type 23 Badger
- Bristol Types 24 Braemar and 25 Braemar II - triplane heavy bomber, 2 built
- Bristol Type 26 Pullman - passenger derivative of Braemar, 1 built
- Bristol Types 27–29, 47, and 48 Tourer
- Bristol Types 30 and 46 Babe
- Bristol Type 31 Grampus - unbuilt passenger aircraft
- Bristol Type 32 Bullet - biplane racer, one built
- Bristol Type 36 Seely - short takeoff and slow landing speed competition entrant
- Bristol Type 37 Tramp - steam powered passenger derivative of Pullman, 2 built but not flown
- Bristol Types 52 and 53 Bullfinch - convertible monoplane/biplane. prototypes only
- Bristol Type 62 and 75 Ten-Seater and Type 79 Brandon
- Bristol Type 72 Racer
- Bristol Type 76 Jupiter Fighter - conversion of F.2 fighter to use Jupiter engine
- Bristol Type 73 Taxiplane and Type 83/183 Primary Trainer
- Bristol Type 84 Bloodhound - two-seat reconnaissance/fighter, 4 prototypes built
- Bristol Type 90 Berkeley
- Bristol Type 91 Brownie
- Bristol Type 92 'Laboratory' biplane
- Bristol Types 93 Boarhound and 93A Beaver
- Bristol Type 95 Bagshot
- Bristol Type 99 Badminton
- Bristol Type 101
- Bristol Type 105 Bulldog
- Bristol Type 107 Bullpup
- Bristol Type 109
- Bristol Type 110A
- Bristol Type 118
- Bristol Type 120
- Bristol Type 123
- Bristol Type 130 Bombay - troop transport-medium bomber for use in Middle East and India
- Bristol Type 133
- Bristol Type 138 - high-altitude monoplane research aircraft, 1 built
- Bristol Type 142 'Britain First' - high speed passenger aircraft
- Bristol Type 143 - parallel development of Type 142 with Aquila engine
- Bristol Type 146
- Bristol Type 148
- Bristol Types 142M, 149, and 160 Blenheim

==== World War II ====
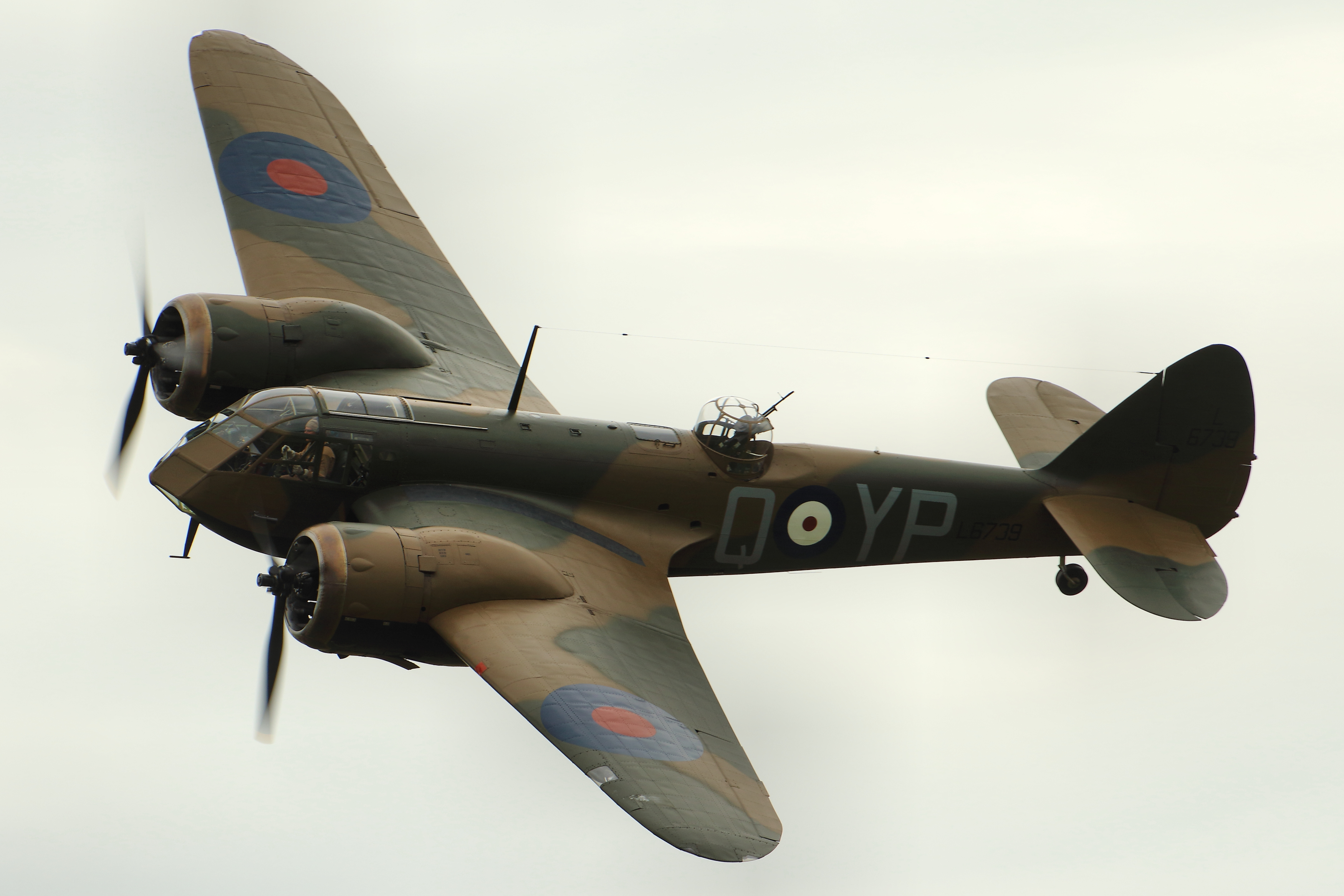
The only flying Blenheim (Mk.1 L6739) displaying at Duxford in 2015

- Bristol Fairchild Type 149 Bolingbroke - licence built Blenheim
- Bristol Type 152 Beaufort - torpedo bomber
- Bristol Type 156 Beaufighter - two engine fighter, and torpedo bomber
- Bristol Type 159 - four engine heavy bomber, not built
- Bristol Type 163 Buckingham - medium bomber
- Bristol Type 164 Brigand
- Bristol Type 166 Buckmaster

==== Post-WWII ====
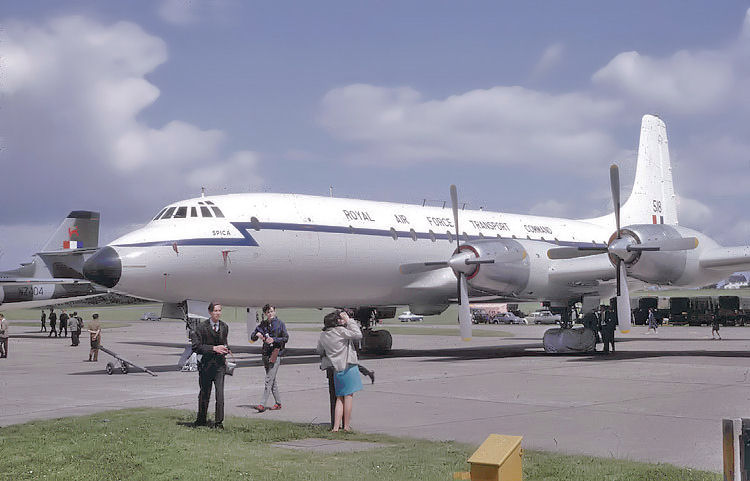
Royal Air Force Bristol Britannia Spica

- Bristol Type 167 Brabazon - very large airliner, one built
- Bristol Type 170 Freighter and Wayfarer
- Bristol Superfreighter
- Bristol Type 175 Britannia
- Bristol Type 188 high speed research aircraft

=== Helicopters ===
- Bristol Type 171 Sycamore
- Bristol Type 173 - twin rotor
- Bristol Type 192 Belvedere - twin rotor

=== Engines ===
Bristol Engine designs include:

Original series:

- Cherub
- Lucifer
- Jupiter
- Titan
- Mercury
- Neptune
- Pegasus
- Phoenix
- Hydra

Sleeve-valve engines:

- Perseus
- Aquila
- Taurus
- Hercules
- Centaurus

Turbines'

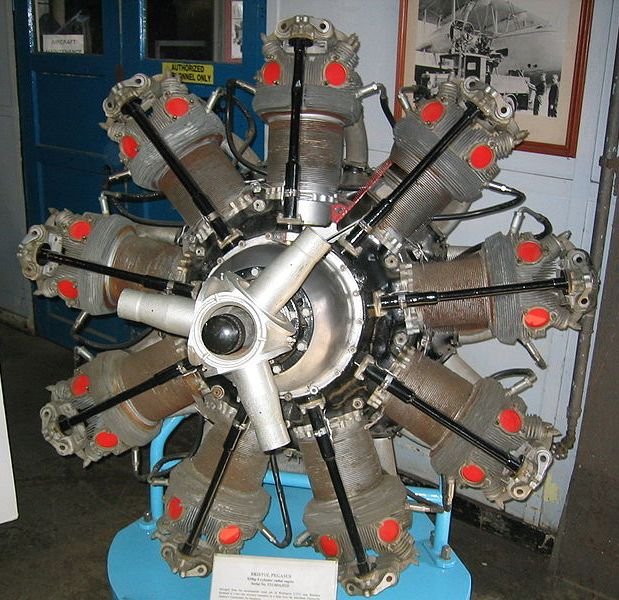
The Bristol Pegasus

- Theseus turboprop with heat exchanger
- Proteus two-shaft turboprop
- Olympus two-spool turbojet
- Orpheus single-spool turbojet
- Orion two-shaft turboprop
- Pegasus two-spool vectored thrust turbofan
- Cumulus APU for TSR-2
- Bristol Janus small free-power turbine engine for Bristol Type 173 helicopter

Ramjet types:

- BRJ.801
- Thor
- Odin

=== Missiles and rockets ===
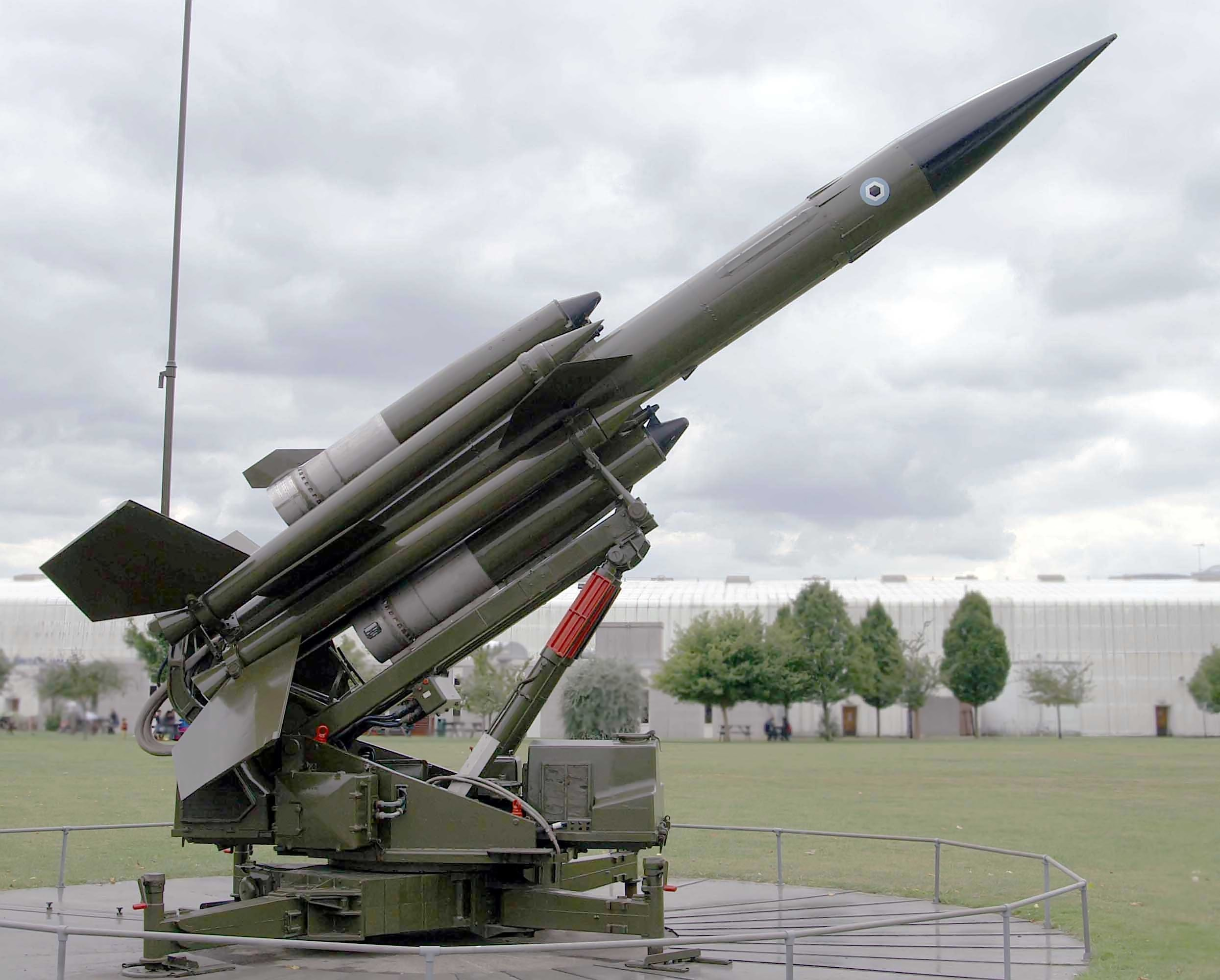
The Bristol Bloodhound

Bristol missile designs include:

- Blue Envoy – project for a surface-to-air missile to meet Operational Requirement 1140; did not enter production
- Bloodhound – surface-to-air missile
- Fulmar – research rocket
- Skua – sounding rocket
- Bristol 182 for the specification UB.109T, also known by MoS codename "Blue Rapier"

=== Aircraft turrets ===
Bristol began producing gun turrets with its Bristol Type 120 submission for an Air Ministry specification. The turret was a glazed cupola over a Scarff ring mounted Lewis light machine gun. Although it had to be rotated manually, it provided protection from the slipstream for the air gunner. and similar turrets were fitted to the Bristol Bombay. The first powered turrets by Bristol used hydraulics. In the B.II nose turret and B.III tail turret, a Vickers K machine gun mounted in a narrow horizontal strip was linked to gunsight. A ram rotated the strip and hence the gun horizontally, the glazing remaining stationary.

The Bristol Type B.1 was more typical of later gun turret designs; the gun elevating through a slot in the glazing which rotated. The Type B.1 had two distinct features; the cupola could be lowered reducing drag and, though the single gun was centrally aligned, the gun cradle could be pivoted independently of the turret. The latter meant that the turret could be turned with sufficient offset that the gunner could fire along the side of the rudder and engage targets directly astern. The Type B.1 was fitted to Bristol Blenheim and Beaufort, and to the Avro Anson and Fairey Battle (with two Browning machine guns) when they were used as gunnery trainers.

The Type B.IV was a lightweight (66 kg) turret designed specifically for the Beaufort mid-upper position with one (B.IV Mk 1) or two (B.IV Mk 1E) Vickers K machine guns

Type X was a two 0.303-in Browning machine gun turret for the Blenheim Mk V.to replace the earlier design.

The Type B.11 was a four gun turret developed in 1940. It was intended for a dorsal position on a Beaufighter but the design was not put into position though it was also considered for the Douglas Boston and de Havilland Mosquito too.

The Type B.12 was another four gun dorsal turret, this time designed for the Bristol Buckingham. A particular requirement was that when not in use, crew could pass through the turret space to reach the bombardier position. It was successfully tested then redesigned to take two 0.5-inch Browning heavy machine guns as the Mark II variant. The Mark IV had two 0.303 guns.

The B.12 "Mark III" was a test of using electrical rather than hydraulic system to operate the turret; the system proved effective was adopted on the later B.16, B.17, B.18 and B.30 turrets.

A second turret was developed for the Buckingham to cover the rear below the aircraft. It was mounted at the back of the gondola type bomb aimer position under the fuselage and fitted with two Browning machine guns.

The "B.14" designation was used for a four gun remote controlled nose mounting rather than a turret. Another design intended for the Buckingham it was included on the pre-production mockup but not developed further.

== See also ==
- Aerospace industry in the United Kingdom
- Bristol Aerospace, Canadian subsidiary
- Roy Fedden, engine designer
- Harry Ricardo, engine designer
- Bristol Aeroplane Company F.C., the works football team
