= Frank Barnwell =

British aeronautical engineer

Captain Frank Sowter Barnwell OBE AFC FRAeS BSc (23 November 1880 – 2 August 1938) was a British aeronautical engineer. With his elder brother Harold, he built the first successful powered aircraft made in Scotland and later went on to a career as an aircraft designer with the Bristol Aeroplane Company, designing aircraft such as the Bristol Fighter, the Bulldog and the Blenheim.

== Early life ==
Barnwell was born in Lewisham in south east London but the family moved to Glasgow the year after his birth. He was educated at Fettes College in Edinburgh, after which he served a six-year apprenticeship with the Fairfield Shipbuilding and Engineering Company, of which his father was a partner, between 1898 and 1904. He attended the University of Glasgow at the same time and received a BSc in naval architecture in 1905. He then spent a year in America working as a draughtsman for a shipbuilder.

== Aviation career ==
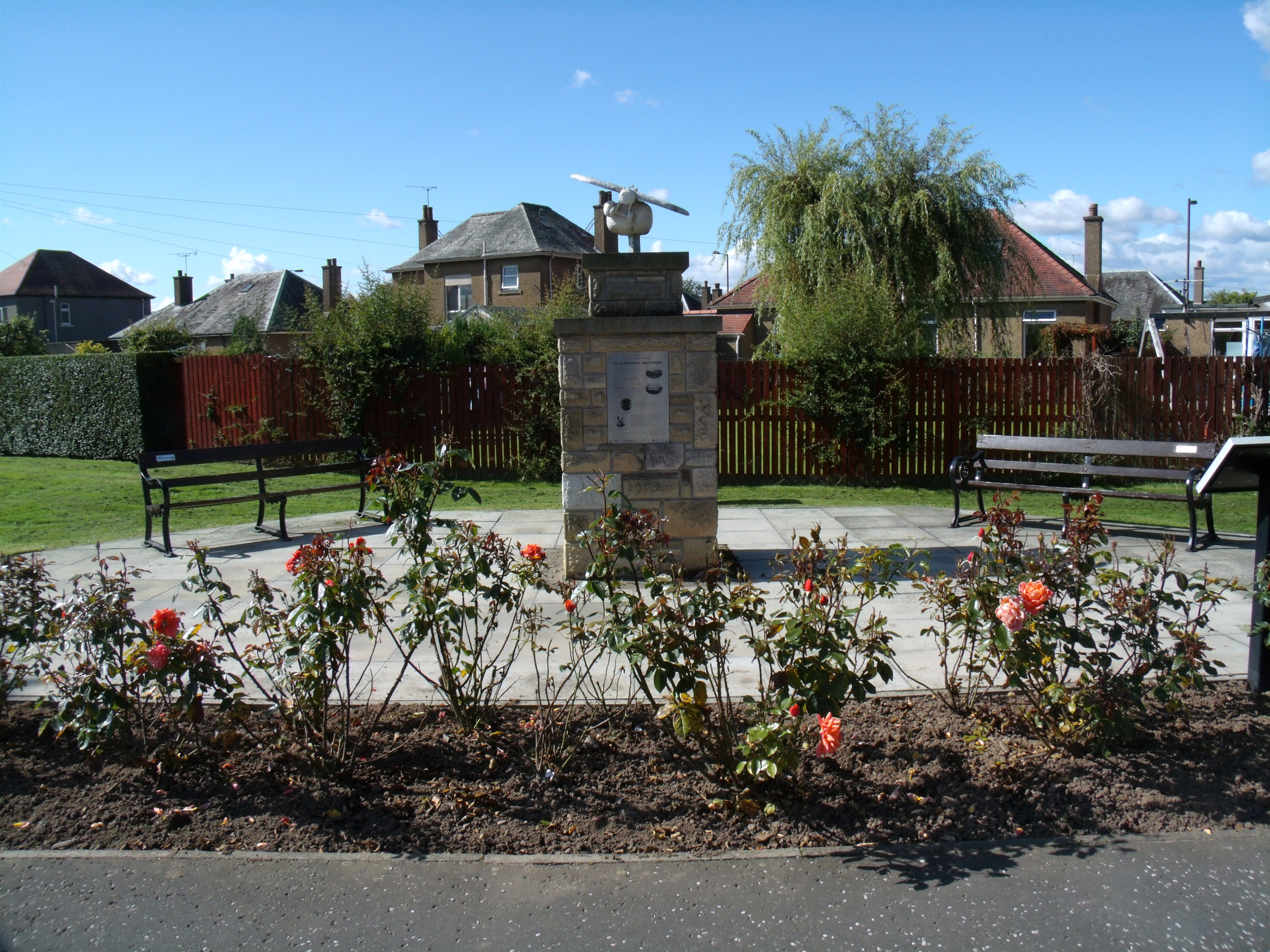
Memorial at Causewayhead, Stirling

In 1907 he returned to Scotland and established the Grampian Motors & Engineering Company in Stirling in partnership with his brother Harold. The brothers had built an unsuccessful glider in 1905, and between 1908 and 1910 they constructed three experimental powered aircraft. The first lacked sufficient power to fly, but the second, a canard biplane, made the first powered flight in Scotland, piloted by Harold in July 1909. but was wrecked on the second attempt to fly it. The third, a mid-wing monoplane, was built during 1910 and flown by to win a prize for the first flight of over a mile in Scotland on 30 January 1911 at Causewayhead under the Wallace Monument. In late 1911 Barnwell was hired to work as a designer for a secret department set up by the British and Colonial Aeroplane Company to work on an unconventional seaplane project for the Admiralty in collaboration with Dennistoun Burney, resulting in the unsuccessful Bristol-Burney seaplanes. He then co-designed the Bristol Scout with Harry Busteed. When war broke out in 1914 Barnwell enlisted in the Royal Flying Corps and after qualifying as a pilot at the Central Flying School, Upavon, he joined 12 Squadron RFC but in August 1915 was released from service to become chief designer at Bristol. Here he put his experience of service conditions to use by designing the Bristol Fighter, one of the outstanding aircraft of the war. With the exception of a short period between October 1921 and October 1923, when he briefly emigrated to Australia to work as an aviation advisor to the Australian Government, he worked as Bristol's head of design for the rest of his life, designing aircraft such the Bristol Bulldog and Bristol Blenheim.

Barnwell was killed in an aircraft crash in 1938, piloting a small aircraft he had designed and had constructed privately, the Barnwell B.S.W. The aircraft was thrown into the air when it struck a bump when taking off from Bristol (Whitchurch) Airport and then stalled, crashing onto a nearby road.

== Family ==
Frank and Marjorie (née Sandes) Barnwell had three sons who all lost their lives in the second world war:

- Pilot Officer David Usher Barnwell DFC, RAFVR, of No. 607 Squadron RAF died aged 19 on 14 October 1941.
- Flight Lieutenant Richard Antony Barnwell, RAF of No. 102 Squadron RAF died aged 24 on 29 October 1940.
- Pilot Officer John Sandes Barnwell, RAF of No. 29 Squadron RAF died aged 20 on 19 June 1940.

== Honours and awards ==
- 7 June 1918 - Captain Frank Sowter Barnwell. Aeroplane Designer, The British and Colonial Aeroplane Company, Limited to be an Officer of the Order of the British Empire for services in connection with the War.
- 1 September 1918 - Capt. Frank Sowter Barnwell, OBE awarded the Air Force Cross in recognition of distinguished service.

Business positions
Preceded by	Chief Designer of the Bristol Aeroplane Company; October 1923 - August 1938	Succeeded by Leslie Frise
