= Burnelli UB-20 =

UB-20
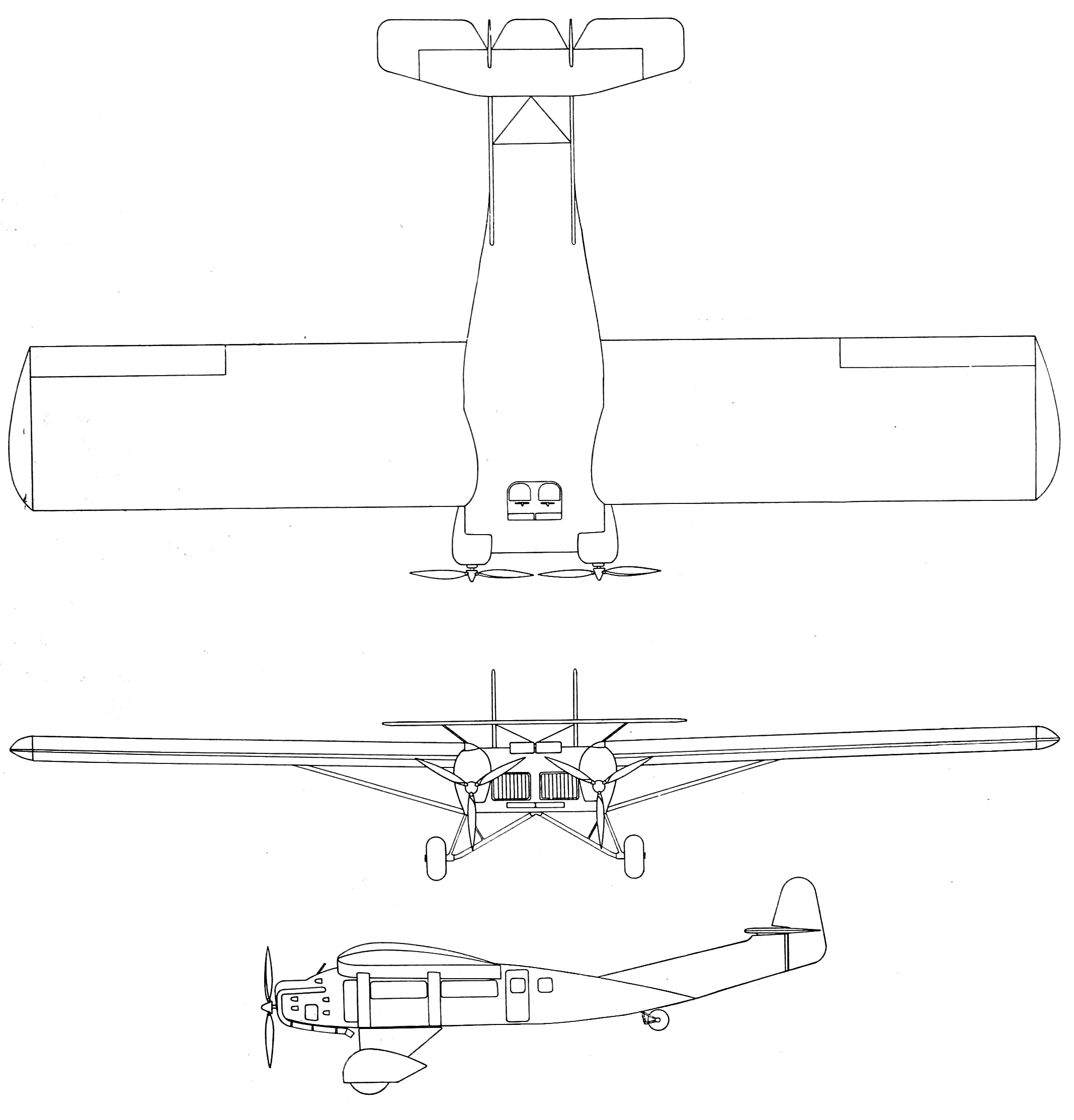
- 3-view drawing of the UB-20 from the September 1930 issue of Aero Digest

General information
- Type: Civil transport
- Manufacturer: Burnelli
- Designer: Vincent Burnelli
- Number built: 1

History
- First flight: 1930

The Burnelli UB-20 was a prototype lifting body airliner designed by Vincent Burnelli and built in the early 1930s.

== Design and development ==
The UB-20 was a high-wing monoplane with a fixed tail wheel landing gear. It is considered the first American construction to have a load-bearing fuselage skin covered with smooth sheet metal. The fuselage structure consisted of seven transverse frames and four T-side members made of duralumin as well as stringers with a U-section. The planking had a thickness of 0.8 mm (0.031 in) and was riveted to the substructure. The wings had a structure consisting of two metal box spars with special drawn T-shaped angle connections. The smooth sheet planking was 0.5 mm (0.020 in) thick. The tanks were in the wing root. The chassis and engine mounts were made from welded chrome-molybdenum steel tubes.

The 20-passenger passenger cabin was 17 ft (5.2 m) x 12 ft 2 in (3.7 m) and was 5 ft 6 in (1.7 m) high. This allowed bulky loads to be transported as well as passengers. The passenger cabin was very comfortably furnished for this time. There were folding seats, a washroom and bunks for night flights. As with most other Burnelli aircraft, the engines were accessible in flight. The machine also had very good single-engine flight characteristics, so the flight altitude could be maintained even with a full payload. Similar to the Remington-Burnelli RB-2, which carried an automobile in the fuselage for advertising purposes, the UB-20 did so in 1934 by moving a Ford automobile under the fuselage between the legs on behalf of the Sun Oil Company.

== Specifications (UB-20) ==
General characteristics

- Crew: 2
- Capacity: 16 passengers
- Length: 52 ft 0 in (15.85 m)
- Wingspan: 90 ft 1 in (27.46 m)
- Height: 13 ft (4.0 m)
- Powerplant: 2 × Packard 2500 V-12 water-cooled piston engines, 750 hp (560 kW) each

Performance

- Maximum speed: 165 mph (266 km/h, 143 kn)
- Range: 1,000 mi (1,600 km, 870 nmi)
- Service ceiling: 17,000 ft (5,200 m)
