= Christmas Aeroplane Company =

American aircraft manufacturer

- Industry: Aircraft Production
- Founded: 26 October 1909; 116 years ago
- Defunct: 1912; 114 years ago
- Successor: Durham Christmas Aeroplane Sales & Exhibition Company (1912), Cantilever Aero Company (1918)
- Headquarters: Washington D.C.
- Key people: Dr. William Whitney Christmas (1865-1960), Lester C. McLeod, Thomas W. Buckey

The Christmas Aeroplane Company was an American aircraft manufacturer.

== History ==
It was founded in October 1909 to produce an aircraft, initially with $1,200 in funding, followed by an additional $2,500. Its founder Dr. William Whitney Christmas had claimed to build and fly his first aircraft, the "Red Bird I" in 1908 becoming the second person to fly an aircraft after the Wright Brothers. The Christmas aeroplane company built its first aircraft, the "Red Bird II" at College Park Maryland with a claimed flight on 15 October 1911. The "Red Bird III" was built in the spring of 1912, with a contract from the U.S. Postal service to deliver Air Mail.

== Aircraft ==
Summary of aircraft built by Cantilever Aero Company
Model name	First flight	Number built	Type
Christmas Bullet - Built by the Continental Aircraft Corporation of New York	1918	2	Scout
