= Burnelli CB-16 =

CB-16
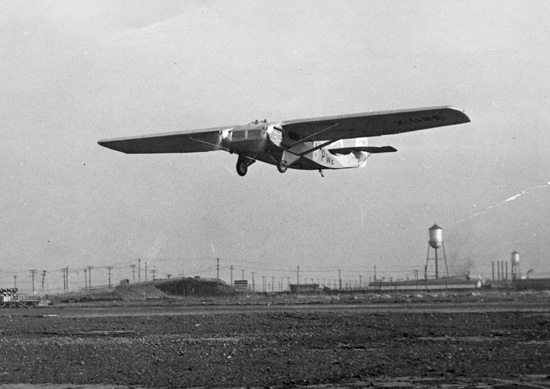

General information
- Type: Passenger aircraft
- National origin: United States of America
- Manufacturer: Burnelli
- Designer: Vincent Burnelli
- Number built: 1

History
- First flight: 8 January 1929

The Burnelli CB-16, also known as the Uppercu-Burnelli CB-300, was a passenger aircraft designed by the American company Burnelli in 1928. It was the first twin-engined aircraft to have retractable landing gear. Only one was built.

== Design and development ==
The CB-16 was built for and financed by Paul W. Chapman, chairman of Sky Lines Inc. in 1928, following the success of the Burnelli RB-2.

The CB-16 was a twin-engined high-wing monoplane, constructed of metal. The slightly tapered wing was braced from the lower fuselage by pairs of parallel struts. The fuselage was 36 ft (11 m) long and 12 ft (3.7 m wide) wide externally, with an airfoil cross section. As with the earlier RB-1 and RB-2, the twin engines were embedded within the leading edge of the fuselage though, unlike them, the rest of this surface was largely filled with radiators. To reduce yaw after an engine failure, the 500 hp (370 kW) water cooled Curtiss Conqueror inline engines were mounted with slight toe out. The internal dimensions of the cabin, which could seat 12-20 passengers, were 18 ft (5.49 m) by 11 ft 4 in (3.45 m) long, with a height of 5 ft 6 in (1.71 m). This provided both seating and lounge space. At the rear of the cabin there was a small kitchen and toilets. The pilots sat in open cockpits placed at the wing leading edge.

Earlier Burnelli lifting body designs had fuselages which were rectangular in plan, with the empennage directly attached, but the CB-16's fuselage tapered and the tail unit was mounted beyond the lifting body's trailing edge on a pair of thin panels extending from its sides. The alteration was motivated by the difficulties of pitch and yaw control encountered with the earlier arrangement. The panels swept upwards into a pair of fins and balanced rudders carrying a high set tailplane with three balanced elevators, the rudders working between them. The single wheels of the still novel retracting undercarriage were mounted on V-struts hinged at the lower, outer fuselage, retracting inwards.

The completed aircraft was shipped to Newark, New Jersey. In January 1929 Leigh Wade piloted the aircraft on a 40-minute test flight. Further tests were then conducted at Curtiss Field at Long Island and Bolling Field in Washington. In 1929, during a test, the CB-16 stalled and crashed at takeoff, though the two pilots survived.

== Specifications ==
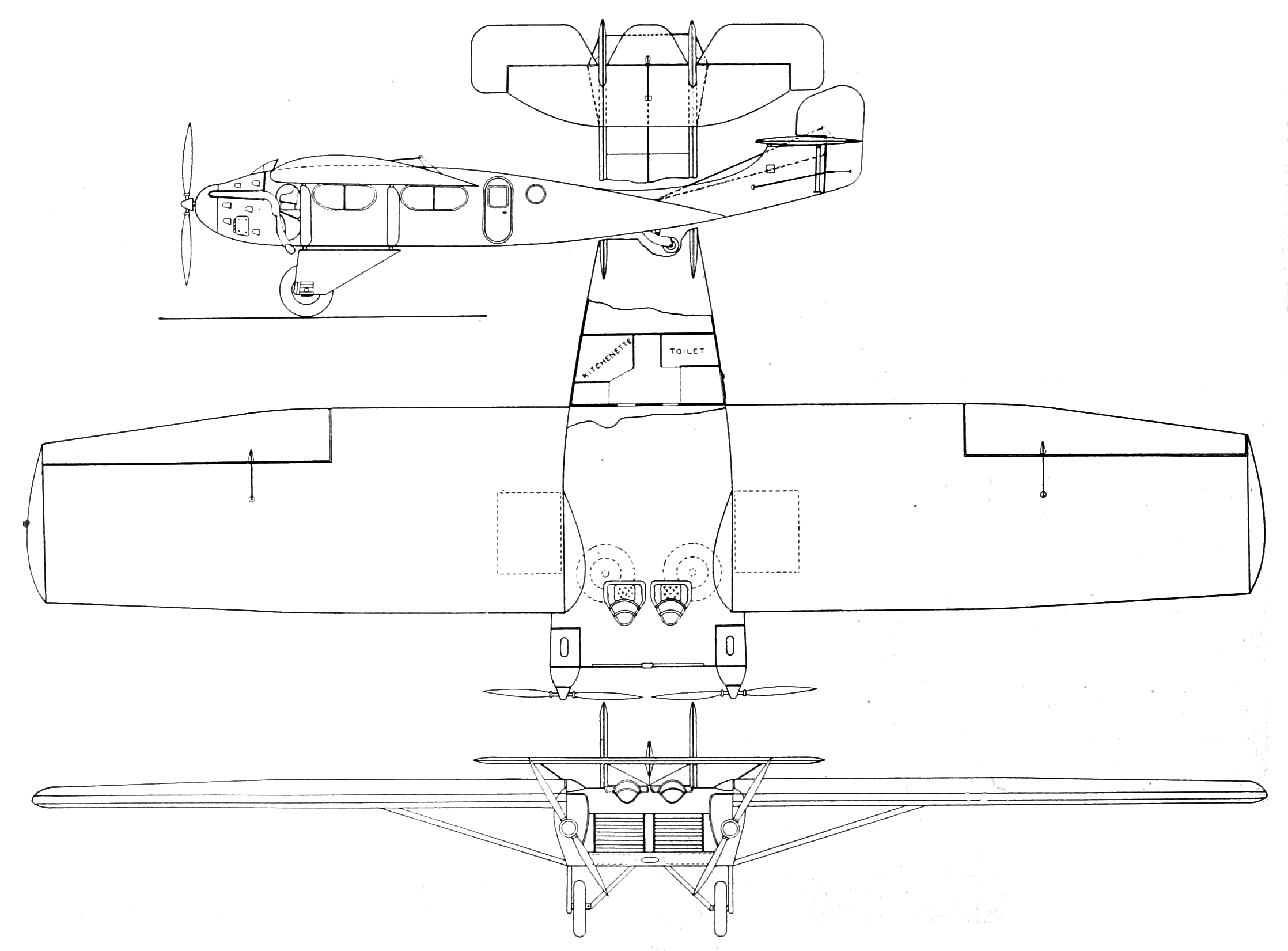
Burnelli CB-16 3-view drawing from Aero Digest February 1929

Data from Flight, 1929

General characteristics

- Crew: 2
- Capacity: 2 pilots, up to 20 passengers
- Length: 47 ft 0 in (14.33 m)
- Wingspan: 90 ft 0 in (27.43 m)
- Wing area: 1,018 sq ft (94.6 m^{2})
- Empty weight: 8,700 lb (3,946 kg)
- Gross weight: 11,700 lb (5,307 kg)
- Fuel capacity: 1,000 US gal (834 Imp gal, 3,790 L)
- Powerplant: 2 × Curtiss Conqueror V-12 piston engine, 500 hp (370 kW) each
- Propellers: 2-bladed

Performance

- Maximum speed: 145 mph (233 km/h, 126 kn)
- Cruise speed: 115 mph (185 km/h, 100 kn)
- Stall speed: 52 mph (84 km/h, 45 kn)
- Range: 800 mi (1,300 km, 700 nmi)
- Service ceiling: 16,500 ft (5,000 m)
- Rate of climb: 940 ft/min (4.8 m/s)
