= UB-14 =

UB-14 may refer to:

- SM UB-14 a German World War I submarine
- Burnelli UB-14, a 1930s American prototype propeller aircraft
