= Burnelli UB-14 =

American prototype aircraft

UB-14
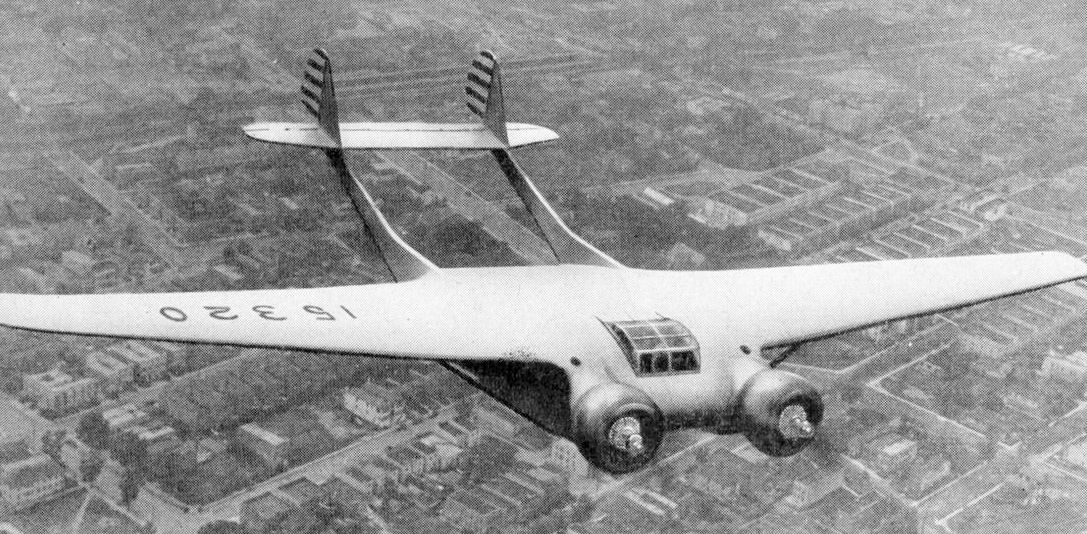

General information
- Type: Civil transport
- Manufacturer: Burnelli
- Designer: Vincent Burnelli
- Number built: 3

History
- First flight: 1934
- Developed into: Burnelli CBY-3

The Burnelli UB-14 and a developed variant named OA-1 Clyde Clipper were 1930s American prototype lifting-fuselage airliners designed by Vincent Burnelli, who was responsible for constructing the first two examples.

== Design and development ==
Following on from his earlier designs Vincent Burnelli designed a commercial transport version using the lifting-fuselage concept. Burnelli's designs were based on the idea that an airfoil-section fuselage could contribute to the lift generated. The Burnelli UB-14 first flew in 1934, and had an airfoil-section fuselage that formed the centre-section of the wing. The aircraft had twin tailbooms and a widespan tailplane and elevator fitted with twin fins and rudders. The UB-14 had retractable landing gear and was powered by two Pratt & Whitney radial engines. An enclosed cockpit for the crew of two was located on the centre wing's upper surface. The cabin could hold 14 to 18 passengers.

== Operational history ==
The first prototype, UB-14, was destroyed in a 1935 accident attributed to faulty maintenance on the aileron control system. Burnelli then designed and built an improved version, the UB-14B. An extensively modified version of the UB-14B design was built under licence in the United Kingdom by Cunliffe-Owen Aircraft, powered by two Bristol Perseus XIVC radials as the Cunliffe-Owen OA-1 Clyde Clipper. The UB-14B was to have been built by Scottish Aviation, but with more streamlined inline engines.

Burnelli applied to the CAA for approval to fly a transatlantic flight with Clyde Edward Pangborn as the pilot in September 1936, however it failed its airworthiness certification due to an excessively long takeoff run and poor quality control. Its performance was later tested at A&AEE Boscombe Down in 1939.

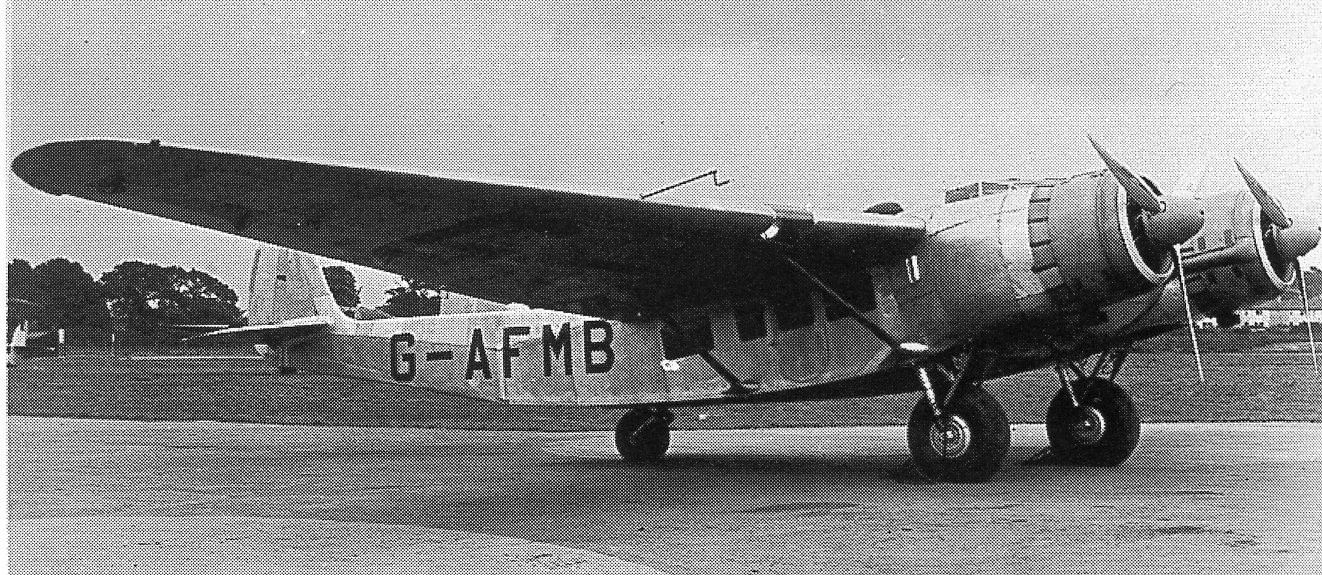
The Perseus XIVc-powered Cunliffe-Owen O.A.1 in July 1939

After appropriate work, in June 1941 Jim Mollison and an Air Transport Auxiliary crew delivered the Cunliffe-Owen OA-1, now registered as G-AFMB to Fort Lamy, Chad. It was then fitted out as a personal transport for General De Gaulle. At one time it landed in Vichy France while en route to Fort Lamy. It was later abandoned at RAF Kabrit in Egypt, and burned during VJ-Day celebrations.

== Variants ==
UB-14
Prototype, powered by Pratt & Whitney engines, registered as NX14740. Built by Burnelli Company. Destroyed 13 January 1935, without injury.
UB-14B
Second prototype with modifications, registered as NC15320. Built by Burnelli Company. Exported to Nicaragua in 1943 as AN-ABH.
OA-1
Third prototype, registered as G-AFMB, built by Cunliffe-Owen Aircraft under licence with further modifications, in the United Kingdom.

== Specifications (UB-14B) ==
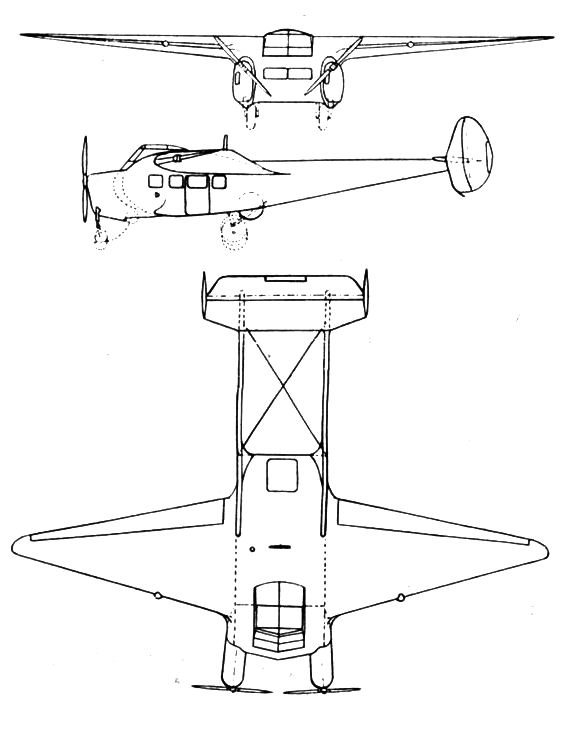
Burnelli UB-14 3-view drawing from L'Aerophile February 1936

General characteristics

- Crew: two
- Capacity: 14–18 passengers
- Length: 44 ft 0 in (13.41 m)
- Wingspan: 71 ft 0 in (21.64 m)
- Height: 10 ft 0 in (3.05 m)
- Wing area: 686 sq ft (63.7 m^{2})
- Airfoil:
  - Fuselage: NACA 4323
  - Outer wing root: NACA 2412
  - Outer wing tip: NACA 2409
- Empty weight: 9,200 lb (4,173 kg)
- Gross weight: 17,500 lb (7,938 kg)
- Powerplant: 2 × Pratt & Whitney Hornet radial piston engines , 750 hp (560 kW) each

Performance

- Maximum speed: 210 mph (340 km/h, 180 kn)
- Cruise speed: 205 mph (330 km/h, 178 kn)
- Range: 1,240 mi (2,000 km, 1,080 nmi)
- Service ceiling: 22,000 ft (6,700 m)

== See also ==
Related development

- Burnelli CBY-3

Aircraft of comparable role, configuration, and era

- Buscaylet-de Monge 7-5
- Dyle et Bacalan DB-10
- Dyle et Bacalan DB-70
- Kalinin K-7
- SAB AB-20
