= Christmas Bullet =

Early aeroplane dubbed "worst plane ever built"

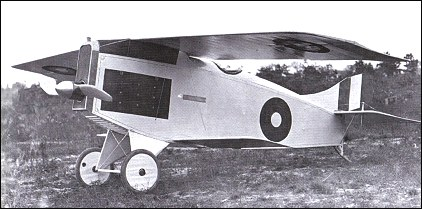
- c. 1918

General information
- Type: Scout
- National origin: United States
- Manufacturer: Christmas Aeroplane Company
- Designer: William Whitney Christmas; Vincent Burnelli
- Status: Destroyed
- Number built: 2

History
- First flight: January 1919

The Christmas Bullet, later known as the Cantilever Aero Bullet (sometimes referred to as the Christmas Strutless Biplane), was an American single-seat cantilever wing biplane. It is considered by many to be among the worst aircraft ever constructed for its time.

== Design and development ==
Dr. William Whitney Christmas (1865–1960), who had no experience in aircraft design or aeronautical work, claimed to have built an aircraft of his own design in 1908 that was lost in a crash. After a second aircraft was supposedly built, called the Red Bird, later modified into the Red Bird II, Christmas founded the Christmas Aeroplane Company based in Washington, DC, in 1910. No evidence beyond his own claims has ever been found for the existence of either of these aircraft. By 1912, the company became the Durham Christmas Aeroplane Sales & Exhibition Company and later the Cantilever Aero Company after moving to Copiague, New York, in 1918.

Christmas convinced two brothers, Henry and Alfred McCarry, to back him. They then paid a visit to Continental Aircraft Company of Long Island, where Christmas convinced management that his planned aircraft would be the key element in an audacious plot to kidnap Kaiser Wilhelm II of Germany. Two designs were proposed, a single-seat "scout" and a three-place "fighting machine".

The single-seat "Christmas Bullet" featured an all-wood construction with a veneer-clad fuselage. Despite his claims to the contrary, neither design feature reduced aerodynamic drag nor was he among the first to use this method of construction; the majority of German World War I–era two-seater aircraft used for bombing and reconnaissance were similarly constructed. The "Bullet" was powered by a prototype Liberty 6 engine. Although the US Army had been persuaded to lend an engine, the proviso was that the prototype engine was to be fitted into an airframe for ground testing only.

The design had a serious flaw in that it lacked any kind of struts or braces for the wings, with Christmas insisting that they should be flexible. Control of the aircraft was meant to be achieved by wing warping to its flying surfaces. Although the Chief Engineer at Continental, Vincent Burnelli, tried to institute changes, the "Christmas Bullet" was completed with the original design features intact. Construction materials were scrounged from available wood and steel stock and were not "aircraft grade", which was also a concern to Burnelli.

== Operational history ==
On its maiden flight in January 1919, the wings of the "Bullet" peeled from the fuselage and the aircraft crashed, killing the pilot, Cuthbert Mills. The destruction of the prototype Liberty engine was never revealed to the US Army and a second Bullet was built powered by a Hall-Scott L-6 engine. Despite the crash, Christmas placed an ad stating that the Christmas Bullet achieved a 197 mph top speed demonstrated in front of Col Harmon at Central Park, Long Island. The second aircraft was displayed in Madison Square Garden on 8 March 1919 as the "First Strutless Airplane". It was also destroyed on its first flight, again with the loss of the test pilot, Lt. Allington Joyce Jolly. The project was abandoned before its United States Army Air Service (USAAS) evaluation. Following the crash of the second Bullet, Christmas continued to campaign for more funding for further projects, seeking out private and government sources, claiming "hundreds" of patents or patent submissions based on his aeronautical research. His far-fetched assertions were proved untrue but he claimed that he sold his unusual wing design to the US Army.

A contemporary technical description with photographs and drawings appeared in Flight, 13 February 1919, claiming that "it would seem that such construction would result in a low factor of safety, but the designer claims a safety factor of seven throughout".

== Specifications (First prototype) ==
Data from

General characteristics

- Crew: 1
- Length: 21 ft 0 in (6.40 m)
- Wingspan: 28 ft 0 in (8.53 m)
- Wing area: 170 sq ft (15.79 m^{2})
- Empty weight: 1,820 lb (826 kg)
- Gross weight: 2,100 lb (953 kg)
- Powerplant: 1 × Liberty 6 , 185 hp (138 kW)

Performance

- Maximum speed: 175 mph (282 km/h, 152 kn) (anticipated)
- Range: 430 mi (885 km, 370 nmi)
- Service ceiling: 14,700 ft (4,481 m)

== See also ==
Aircraft of comparable role, configuration, and era

- Dayton-Wright RB-1 Racer
