= Dyle et Bacalan DB-70 =

1920s French airliner

DB-70
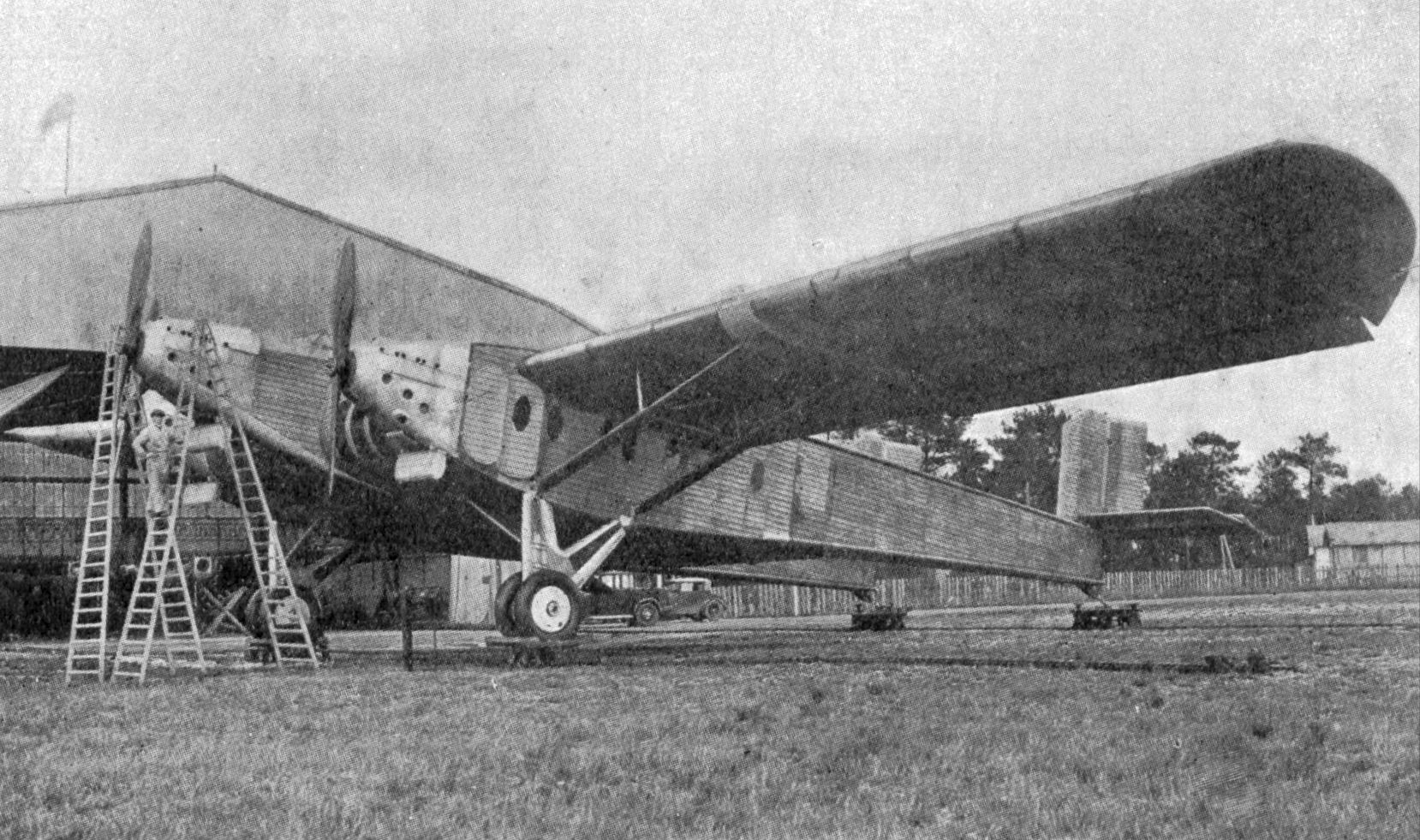

General information
- Type: Airliner
- National origin: France
- Manufacturer: Dyle et Bacalan
- Designer: M.L. de Monge
- Number built: 1

History
- First flight: 15 November 1929"

The Dyle et Bacalan DB-70 was a large three engine French airliner with a thick airfoil centre section which accommodated the passengers. Two fuselages, part of the centre section at the front but distinct further aft, carried the empennage. First flown in 1929, only one was built.

== Design and development ==
In 1925 the large naval ship builders Société Anonyme de Travaux Dyle et Bacalan, established in 1879 and based in Bordeaux, developed an aircraft manufacturing interest. They built several all-metal prototypes incorporating very thick wings. The DB-70 was the largest of these and the last to carry the company name: Dyle et Bacalan ceased trading in July 1929, before the DB-70 had flown, though the company reformed as Société Aérienne Bordelaise (SAB) that same month. As a result, the aircraft is sometimes referred to as the SAB DB-70; the letter prefix DB was retained, though aircraft designed later by SAB used the AB- form .

The DB-70 was a very large, all metal aircraft built, like all Dyle et Bacalan aircraft, largely of duralumin. As on the 1926 DB-10, the centre section of the wing of the DB-70 was extremely thick and twice the chord of the outer wings, with a chord/thickness ratio of about 25%. The layout of the two designs was different, though; the otherwise conventionally laid-out DB-10 had thick wings inboard of its two engines, whereas the DB-70 was built around its thick centre section with twin fuselages, developed from it rearwards, carrying the empennage. The centre section also mounted the three 450 kW (600 hp) Hispano-Suiza water-cooled inline engines and the pilots' cockpit and enclosed the passenger accommodation.

The 9.25 m span wide (30 ft) centre section, the structural core of the DB-70, was based on four steel transverse spars, separated vertically by 2.30 m (7 ft 6 in), horizontally by 1.95 m (6 ft 5 in) and cross-braced into six frames, forming five transverse bays. The two pairs of outer frames defined the forward fuselages and the outer wings, engines and undercarriage legs were attached to the outermost frames. The centre engine was mounted on the central frame, positioned well forward of both the leading edge and of the planes of the two outer propellers. The whole structure was duralumin skinned to form an aerofoil section with a chord of about 10 m (33 ft), the lower surface continuing to form the undersides of the fuselages.

The outer wings were mounted high on the fuselage sides, carried 3° of dihedral and were of parallel chord with rounded tips. Each was supported from below by a pair of struts mounted on the lower fuselage longeron. The fuselages were simple rectangular cross section structures, built around four longerons and tapering rearwards. They carried the horizontal tail surfaces, both between them and extending outwards. The angle of incidence of this 'fixed' tail could be adjusted in flight for trimming. It carried three linked and balanced elevators. Two rectangular fins carried balanced rudders. The DB-70 had a fixed conventional undercarriage with double mainwheels on V-shaped shock absorbing legs mounted on the lower longerons, with bracing struts to the centre of the centre section. This arrangement produced a wide undercarriage track of 6.65 m (21 ft 10 in). Sprung tailskids were placed the extreme ends of each fuselage.

The passenger accommodation was a rectangular area within the deepest part of the centre section, 5.35 m (17 ft 6 in) long, about 9.5 m (30 ft) wide and 1.88 m (6 ft 2 in) high. The structural bays divided this space laterally into three: two outer, 10 seat cabins 1.80 m (6 ft) wide, each lit by 5 windows in the outer fuselage walls, and a central saloon with eight arm chairs grouped around two tables. For night flights, the seats in each of the cabins were replaced by 8 berths, reducing the overall accommodation to 24. Aft of this central area were toilets, a kitchen and baggage space plus corridor access to a floor trapdoor which was the principal passenger entryway. A 'promenade' ran the width of the centre section ahead of the seating areas, lit by glazed wing leading edges, with further passenger access doors at either end. Adjacent to it in the centre section leading edge was a corridor that allowed the third crew member, a mechanic, to enter the engine compartments for in-flight servicing. The two pilots sat in an open cockpit, fitted with dual controls, at the centre section leading edge.

The first flight of the DB-70 was on 15 November 1929 from Merignac Aerodrome. Initial trial flights showed the aircraft could take off in about 120 m (400 ft) carrying a 5 tonne load. It flew around the airfield at Vincennes on both days of the National Aviation meeting held there in June 1930. Photographs show that modifications were made after the early flights, including the provision of external exhaust pipes and an increase in passenger window size, done by making the original oval windows into square ones. Only one DB-70 was built, though the military, four engine SAB AB-20 and SAB AB-21 used very similar airframes.

== Specifications ==
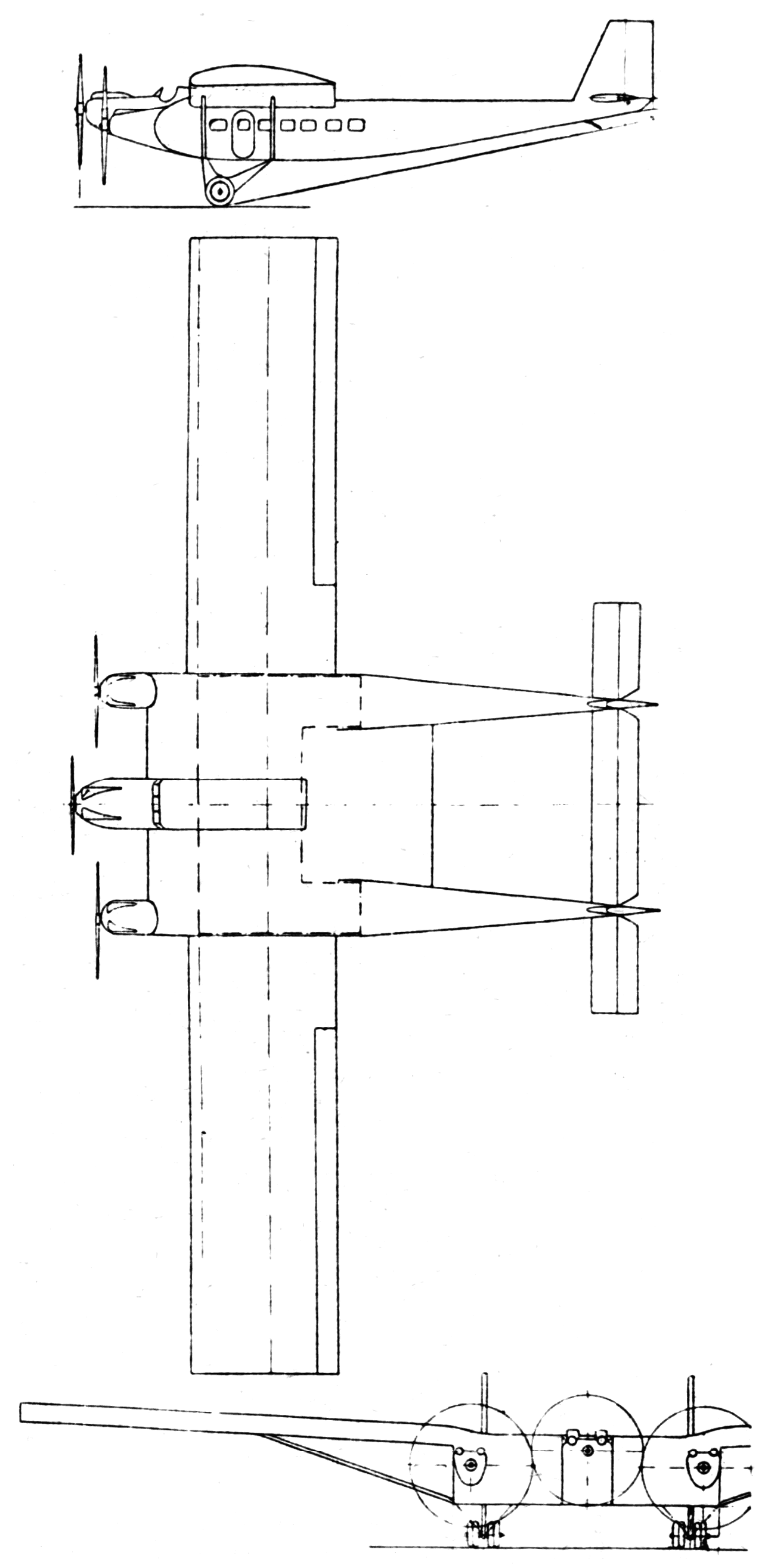
Dyle et Bacalan DB-70 3-view drawing from L'Aérophile November,1928

Data from Flight, 1930

General characteristics

- Crew: 3
- Capacity: 28 passengers on daytime flights, 24 on night flights
- Length: 20 m (65 ft 7 in)
- Wingspan: 37 m (121 ft 5 in)
- Wing area: 218 m^{2} (2,350 sq ft)
- Empty weight: 7,600 kg (16,755 lb)
- Gross weight: 13,000 kg (28,660 lb)
- Powerplant: 3 × Hispano-Suiza 12Lbr water-cooled, with reduction gear, 450 kW (600 hp) each

Performance

- Maximum speed: 200 km/h (120 mph, 110 kn)
- Cruise speed: 180 km/h (112 mph, 97 kn)
- Range: 1,000 km (620 mi, 540 nmi)
- Service ceiling: 4,500 m (14,800 ft)

== See also ==
Related development

- SAB AB-20: bomber development with 4 Lorraine Courlis engines
- SAB AB-21: bomber development with 4 Lorraine Petrel engines

Aircraft of comparable role, configuration, and era

- Junkers G.38
- Burnelli UB-14
