= Burnelli GX-3 =

Experimental aircraft

GX-3
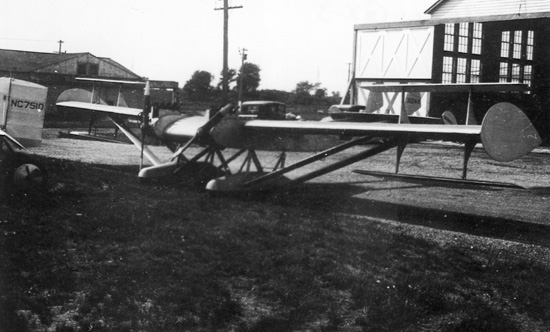

General information
- Type: Experimental aircraft
- National origin: United States of America
- Manufacturer: Burnelli
- Designer: Vincent Burnelli

History
- First flight: 1929

The Burnelli GX-3, also known as Uppercu-Burnelli UB-SS. was an American twin-engined, mid-wing experimental aircraft which first flew in 1929. Work commenced on this aircraft during development of the Burnelli CB-16. Soon after, Daniel Guggenheim announced the Guggenheim Safe Aircraft Competition. Many manufacturers brought aircraft to this competition. The GX-3 was built in New Jersey, but did not arrive at the competition in time to participate. However, it was reported to have good short take-off and landing capabilities and was able to operate at 200 km/h. The GX-3 had wings which were able to change their shape using flaps. The front wheels were smaller than the rear ones, and the aircraft was powered by two 90 hp (67 kW) engines. The pilots sat in an open cockpit. The aircraft also incorporated Burnelli's lifting-body feature.

== Specifications ==
General characteristics

- Crew: 2
- Length: 25 ft 11 in (7.9 m)
- Wingspan: 48 ft 11 in (14.9 m)
- Height: 9 ft 4 in (2.85 m)
- Wing area: 220 sq ft (20 m^{2})
- Empty weight: 1,642 lb (745 kg)
- Max takeoff weight: 2,601 lb (1,180 kg)
- Powerplant: 2 × ADC Cirrus III air-cooled 4-cylinder inline piston engine, 90 hp (67 kW) each

Performance

- Maximum speed: 140 mph (220 km/h, 120 kn)
