= Burnelli CBY-3 =

Canadian experimental transport aircraft

CBY-3
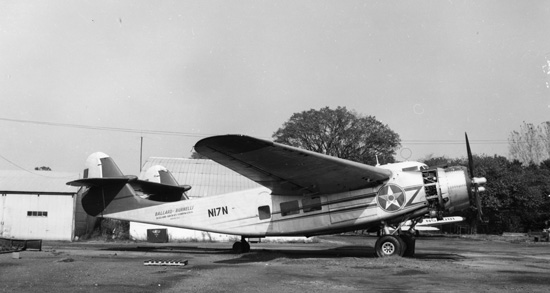
- The Loadmaster at an airport in Virginia in the United States, c. 1959.

General information
- Type: Airliner
- National origin: Canada
- Manufacturer: Canada Car and Foundry
- Designer: Vincent Burnelli
- Status: Museum display
- Number built: 1

History
- First flight: 17 July 1945
- Retired: 8 December 1959
- Developed from: Burnelli UB-14

The Burnelli CBY-3 is an unconventional airliner designed by American aeronautical engineer Vincent Burnelli and built in Canada in 1944 by Canadian Car and Foundry. It was marketed as the Cancargo CAM-1 Loadmaster from 1947, but no production orders followed. The sole example operated until 1959 and became a museum aircraft in 1972. It is the only surviving aircraft designed by Burnelli.

== Design and development ==
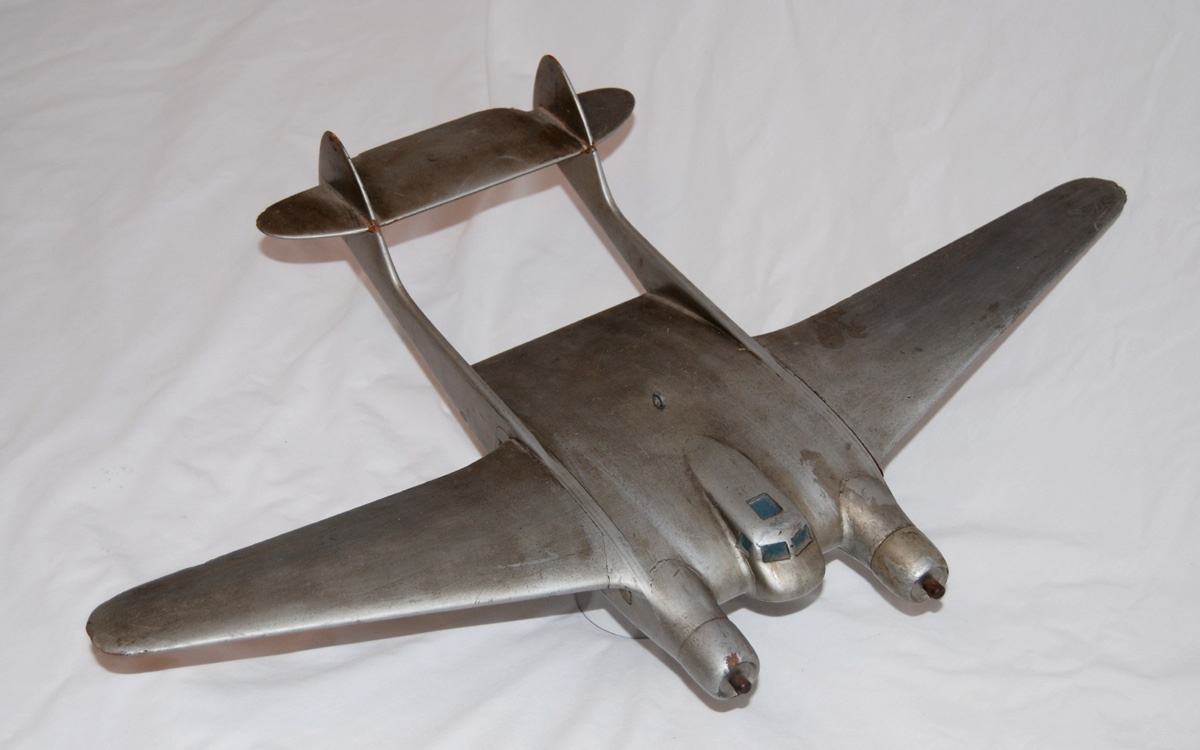
Wooden CBY-3 wind-tunnel test model

Vincent Burnelli, an American aircraft designer, had a lifelong career devoted to exploiting the advantages of the lifting body airfoil concept that characterized many of his earlier aircraft designs. In 1943, Lowell Yerex, a New Zealander who had formed the airline TACA (Transportes Aéreos Centroamericanos, English: Central American Air Transport) in Honduras in 1931, contracted with Canadian Car and Foundry (CanCar) in Montreal, Quebec, Canada, for the construction of 20 airliners designed to TACA's specification. Working at CanCar, Burnelli — who had intended the CBY-3 for bush flying in northern Canada — convinced Yerex that the CBY-3 could operate as both a passenger and cargo aircraft, and Yerex joined the project. CanCar derived its designation for the aircraft, "CBY-3," from the name of the three partners involved in its creation — "CBY" for CanCar, Burnelli, and Yerex, and "3" from the number of partners involved. Burnelli's firm, the Burnelli Aircraft Company, designed the fuselage. CanCar conducted additional design work and wind-tunnel testing and manufactured the CBY-3 prototype in Montreal.

The CBY-3 was a twin-boom, high-lift airliner with an aerofoil-section fuselage — referred to as its "lifting fuselage" — whose design evolved from the earlier Burnelli UB-14. The "lifting fuselage" generated lift additional to that provided by the wings, significantly shortening the length of the aircraft's takeoff run: The CBY-3 could become airborne with a takeoff roll of only 650 feet (198 meters), making it suitable for operation from small airfields. With a 20-foot-wide (6.1-meter) rectangular cross section, the wide-body fuselage enclosed a spacious cabin with seating for 24 passengers in four rows. Two 1,200 hp (895 kW) Pratt & Whitney R-1830-S1C3-G Twin Wasp 14-cylinder, two-row, air-cooled radial engines mounted on the forward edge of the fuselage powered the aircraft and protruded forward of the cockpit section.

The CBY-3 was Burnelli's last design. A follow-up design for CanCar in 1942 for the CC&F B-1000, a bomber using the same lifting body principles, remained a "paper project".

== Operational history ==
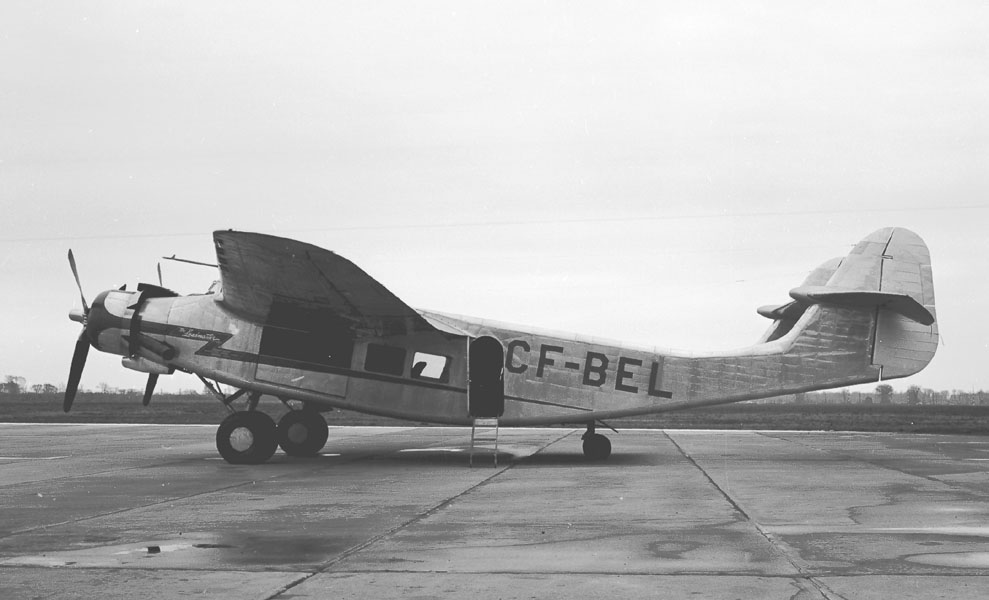
The CBY-3 — marketed from 1947 as the Cancargo CAM-1 Loadmaster — in 1948.

Originally registered in Canada as CF-BEL-X while still in the experimental stage, the CBY-3 prototype garnered significant interest from the airline industry. With Clyde Pangborn and V. J. Hatton at the controls, CF-BEL-X made its first flight on 17 July 1945, taking off from Cartierville Airport in Saint-Laurent, Quebec, Canada, and remaining aloft for 1 hour 55 minutes. By the time of the flight, Yerex had been forced to leave Honduras, and TACA cancelled its order for the aircraft.

Testing demonstrated that the CBY-3 was underpowered, and CanCar re-engined it with two 2,000 hp (1,491 kW) Pratt & Whitney R-2000 Twin Wasp engines. With Hatton at the controls, the aircraft first flew in this configuration on 10 May 1946.

The CBY-3 underwent extensive, rigorous testing and proving flights designed to show off its potential. CanCar formed a subsidiary, Cancargo Aircraft Manufacturing Company Ltd., to develop and manufacture the aircraft, marketing it thereafter as the Cancargo CAM-1 Loadmaster. The United States Air Force evaluated the aircraft at Wright Field in Ohio on 22 June 1948, finding that it had limited utility as a military cargo aircraft. Despite a trouble-free test program and glowing accolades from the press and industry observers, no production orders resulted. In 1951, Cancargo suspended all activities to certify the aircraft and exported it to the United States.

Burnelli's company, by then renamed the Central Aircraft Corporation and headquartered in New York, New York, registered the aircraft in the United States as N17N on 9 February 1951. Airlifts, Inc., of Miami, Florida, acquired the plane and its design rights and took it to Venezuela before returning it to Burnelli's firm — by then renamed Burnelli Avionics — which re-engined it with two 1,700 hp (1,268 kW) Wright R-2600-8 Twin Cyclone radial engines in July 1952.

Moving to Southampton, New York, Burnelli continued to promote the aircraft. In 1955, he adapted the CBY-3 to carry an expedition of 20 passengers and 41 sled dogs, along with their equipment, to the North Pole, but the expedition was canceled. The Loadmaster continued to fly regularly as a commercial airliner both in northern Canada and South America, including proving flights in Canada in 1955 and Venezuela in 1957. Meanwhile, the name of Burnelli's company changed again, to the Ballard Aircraft Corporation.

The aircraft made its last flight on 8 December 1959, landing at Friendship Airport (now Baltimore/Washington International Thurgood Marshall Airport) in Anne Arundel County, Maryland, outside Baltimore.

== Display ==
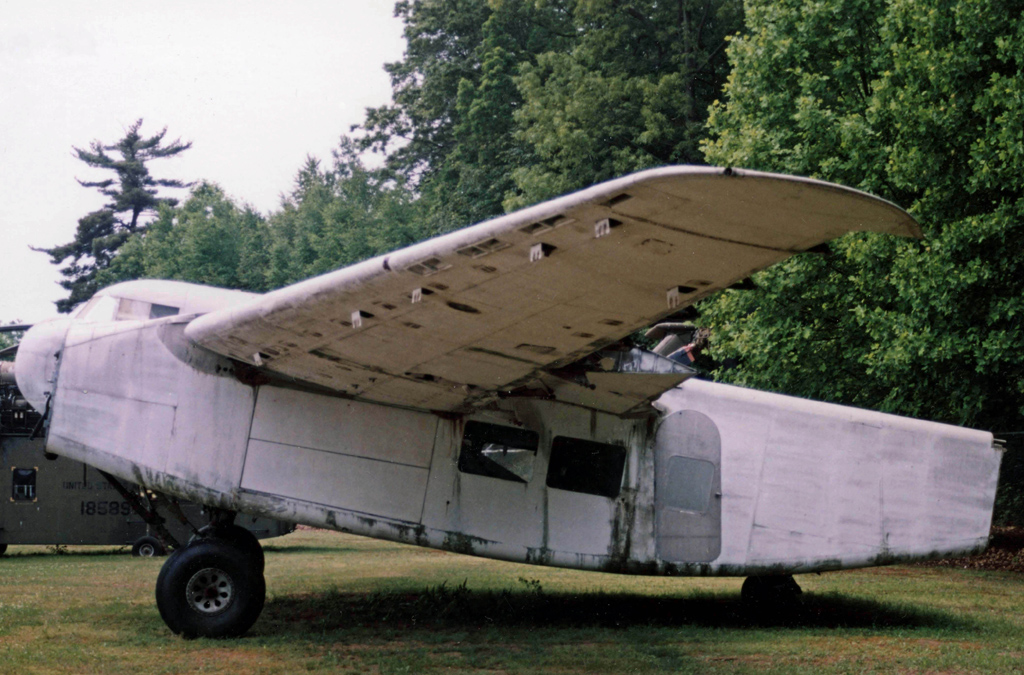
The Burnelli CBY-3 at the New England Air Museum at Windsor Locks, Connecticut, in 2005.

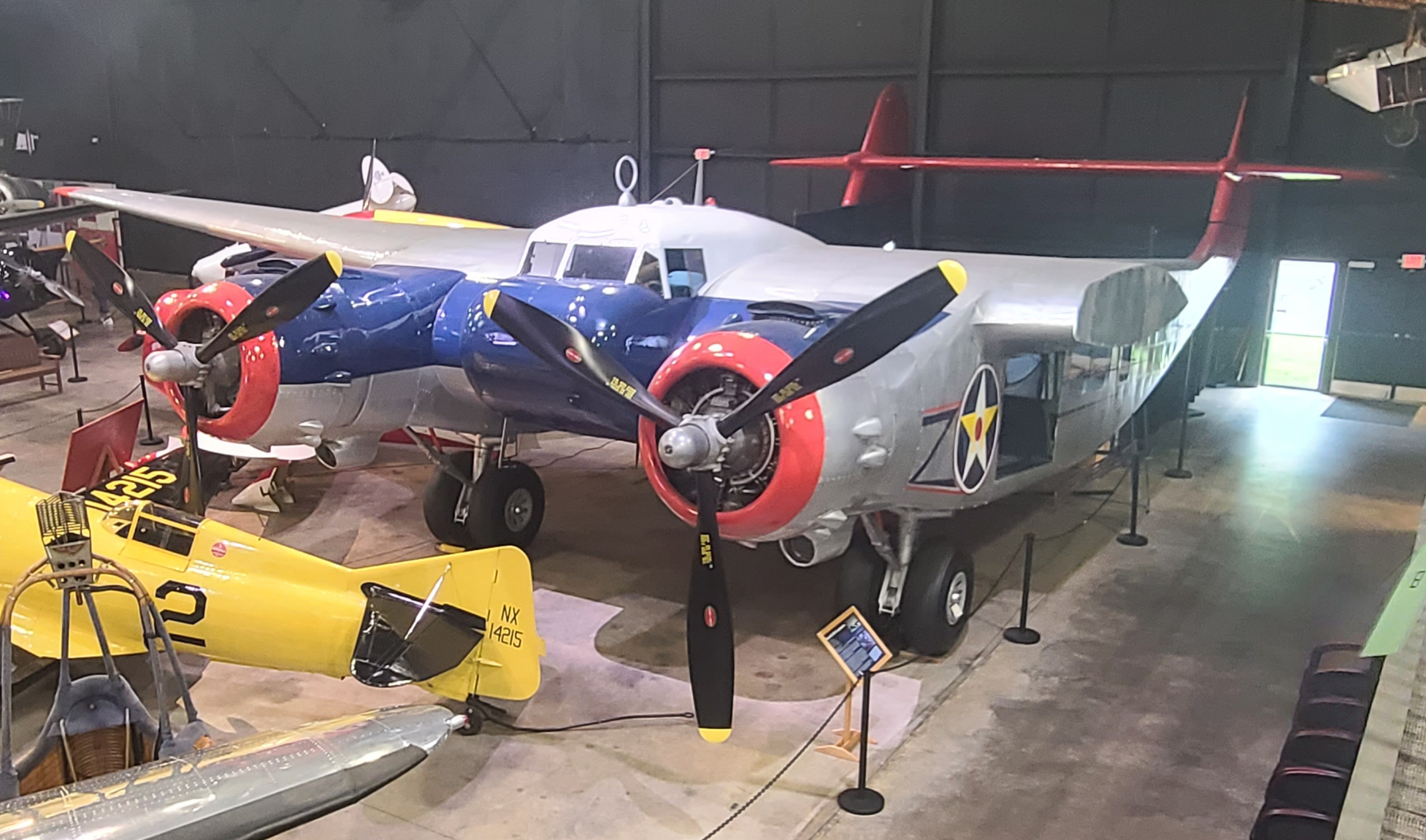
The Burnelli CBY-3 Loadmaster on display at the New England Air Museum in 2025.

After its final flight, the CBY-3 was abandoned and left unsecured at Friendship Airport. Over the next decade, thieves stripped the derelict airframe of its engines, cockpit instrumentation, and internal wiring, among other components. In addition, vandals damaged the plane's rear landing gear. In 1968, the Occidental Aircraft Corporation acquired it, intending to retrofit it with turbine engines, but the company never performed any of its planned work on the plane, and it remained at Friendship Airport.

In 1972, the Occidental Aircraft Corporation donated the airframe to the Connecticut Aeronautical Historical Association, which placed it on display outdoors at the Bradley Air Museum in Windsor Locks, Connecticut. On 3 October 1979, the destructive Windsor Locks tornado passed directly through the museum grounds, destroying 16 historic aircraft, heavily damaging 10 others, and ripping the roof off the main display hangar. The CBY-3 survived, but flying debris damaged its skin.

The tornado damage forced the museum to close for two years. It reopened at a new site in Windsor Locks on 3 October 1981, the second anniversary of the tornado, with the CBY-3 again displayed outdoors. Renamed the New England Aviation Museum in 1984, the museum began an eight-year restoration of the CBY-3 in 2012. In December 2020, the restored CBY-3 returned to public display, relocated to the museum's Civil Aviation Hangar. It is the only surviving aircraft designed by Vincent Burnelli.

== Specifications (CBY-3) ==
Plan view of the Burnelli CBY-3.

Data from Jane's all the World's Aircraft 1947

General characteristics

- Crew: 3
- Capacity: 38 passengers (only) or 22 passengers plus cargo; / 1,170 cu ft (33 m^{3}) capacity
- Length: 54 ft 6 in (16.61 m)
- Wingspan: 85 ft 11 in (26.2 m)
- Height: 13 ft 4 in (4.06 m)
- Wing area: 629 sq ft (58.4 m^{2})
- Empty weight: 16,800 lb (7,620 kg)
- Gross weight: 27,000 lb (12,247 kg)
- Fuel capacity: 624 imp gal (749 US gal; 2,840 L) fuel; 33.3 imp gal (40.0 US gal; 151 L) oil
- Powerplant: 2 × Pratt & Whitney R-1830-S1C3-6 Twin-Wasp 14-cyl. two-row air-cooled radial piston engines, 1,200 hp (890 kW) each
- Propellers: 3-bladed constant-speed propellers, 12 ft (3.7 m) diameter

Performance

- Maximum speed: 221 mph (356 km/h, 192 kn) at 10,000 ft (3,000 m)
- Cruise speed: 193 mph (311 km/h, 168 kn) at 10,000 ft (3,000 m)
- Stall speed: 65 mph (105 km/h, 56 kn) at 24,000 lb (11,000 kg)
- Range: 1,200 mi (1,900 km, 1,000 nmi)
- Endurance: 7 hours
- Service ceiling: 19,400 ft (5,900 m)
- Wing loading: 21.83 lb/sq ft (106.6 kg/m^{2})
- Power/mass: 0.089 hp/lb (0.146 kW/kg)

== See also ==
- Burnelli UB-14
