= Koolhoven F.K.55 =

Dutch fighter prototype

F.K.55
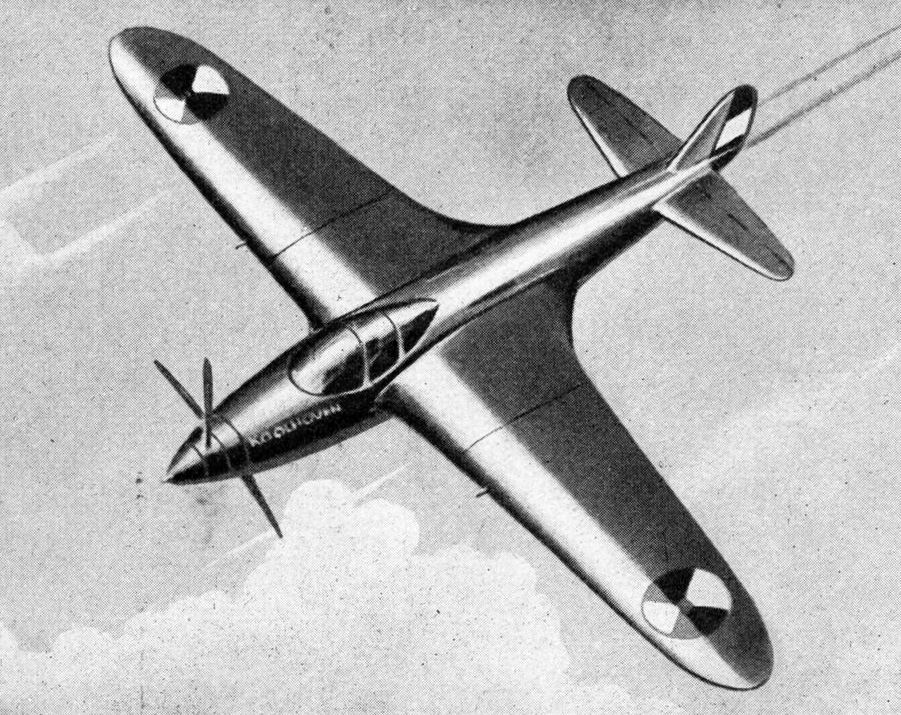

General information
- Type: Fighter
- National origin: Netherlands
- Manufacturer: N.V. Koolhoven Vliegtuigen
- Number built: 1

History
- First flight: 20 June 1938

The Koolhoven F.K.55 was a Dutch fighter prototype of the 1930s, which did not progress beyond the prototype stage.

== Development ==
Design of a Koolhoven high-performance aircraft first started late in 1937. The result, finished in early 1938 was the F.K.55, a single-seat fighter of radical design with contra-rotating propellers and an engine housed behind the pilot. It had initially been proposed to do away with ailerons on the wings, and replace them with "slot-spoilers" for lateral control, however this idea was abandoned early in the project.

Of mixed metal and wood construction with wooden wings, the F.K.55's front fuselage was made of steel tube while wood formed the tail and rear fuselage. Its 640 kW (860 hp) Lorraine Pétrel engine afforded only just enough power to take off and to stay in flight. The production version would have used the more powerful 900 kW (1,200 hp) Lorraine 12R Sterna engine but this never happened.

== Operational history ==
The aircraft flew for the first time on 30 June 1938. It flew for two minutes then landed. Underpowered, the FK.55 was cancelled in the same year.

== Specifications ==
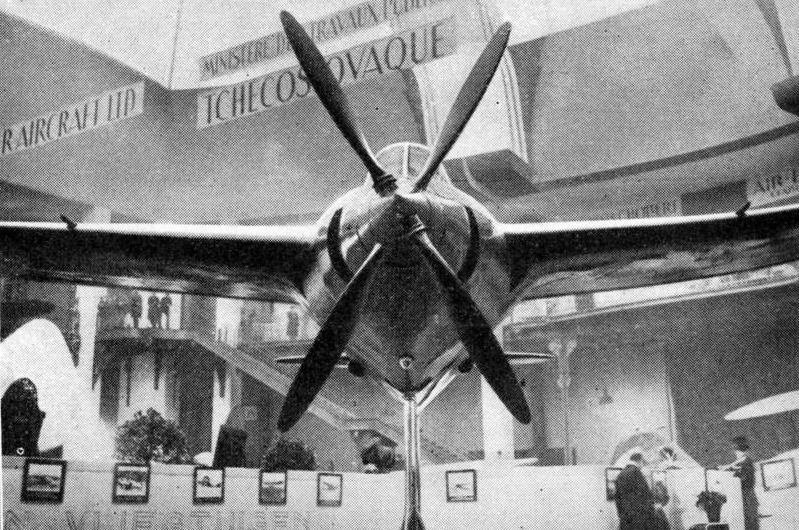
Koolhoven FK 55 photo L'Aerophile December 1936

Data from

General characteristics

- Crew: 1
- Length: 9.25 m (30 ft 4 in)
- Wingspan: 9.60 m (31 ft 6 in)
- Height: 2.60 m (8 ft 6 in)
- Wing area: 16.00 m^{2} (172.23 sq ft)
- Empty weight: 1,600 kg (3,527 lb)
- Gross weight: 2,208 kg (5,026 lb)
- Powerplant: 1 × Lorraine 12Hrs Pétrel V-12 , 640 kW (860 hp)

Performance

- Maximum speed: 510 km/h (317 mph, 275 kn)
- Cruise speed: 450 km/h (280 mph, 240 kn)
- Range: 850 km (528 mi, 459 nmi)
- Rate of climb: 13.1 m/s (2,580 ft/min)

Armament

- 1 × Madsen 20 mm autocannon firing through the propeller
- 4 × wing-mounted .303 in (7.7 mm) machine guns
