= Continental Aircraft Corporation =

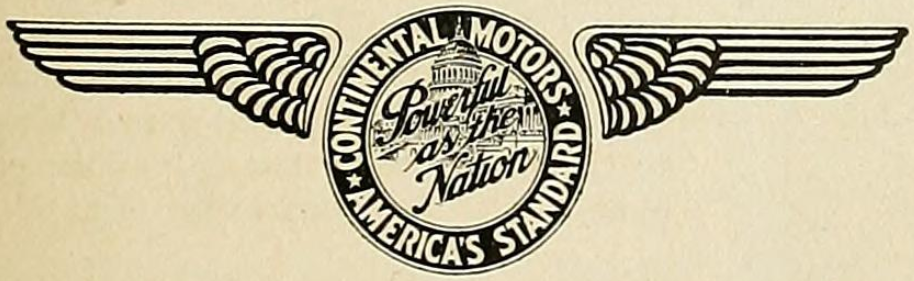
- Founded: 1916
- Successor: Remington-Burnelli Aircraft Corp 1924
- Headquarters: Amityville, New York
- Products: Military aircraft

Continental Aircraft Corporation was an American aircraft manufacturer based in Amityville, New York. The company also maintained offices at 120 Liberty Street, in New York. Continental's chief engineer was Vincent Burnelli, a future advocate of lifting body aircraft.

The company built the Christmas Bullet scout aircraft for the Cantilever Aero Company. Both prototypes suffered structural failure of their thin cantilevered wings, killing test pilots Cuthbert Mills and Allington Jolly.

== Aircraft ==
Summary of aircraft built by Continental Aircraft
Model name	First flight	Number built	Type	Note
Continental KB-1	1918	1	Observer	
Continental KB-3	1918	1	Observer	
Christmas Bullet	1918	2	Scout	built for the Cantilever Aero Company
