= Continental KB-1 =

KB-1

General information
- Type: reconnaissance
- National origin: United States
- Manufacturer: Continental Aircraft Corporation
- Designer: Vincent Justus Burnelli
- Number built: 1

History
- Introduction date: 1916

The Continental KB-1, also known as KB-1 Military Biplane or KB-1 Continental Pusher, is an early design developed by the engineer Vincent Burnelli.

== Development ==
The KB-1 was Burnelli's second production aircraft after his Burnelli-Carisi Biplane. Burnelli's KB-1 tandem pusher biplane was a somewhat conventional design compared to his future lifting-body designs. The aircraft, developed for a U.S. Air Service reconnaissance contact was not awarded a production contract despite successful demonstration flights by test pilot Bert Acosta over New York at temperatures as low as −11 °F.

== Design ==
The KB-1 is a tandem seat pusher biplane with open cockpits. The tail is supported with two steel tube booms. The landing gear used a four-wheel arrangement using Ackerman wheels with "tusks" that dig into the ground for braking. The wings are set without stagger or dihedral. The fuselage is constructed of mahogany veneer.

== Specifications (KB-1) ==
Data from AAHS Journal, Aerial Age

General characteristics

- Crew: 1
- Capacity: 1
- Length: 22 ft (6.7 m)
- Wingspan: 36 ft (11 m)
- Height: 10 ft 3 in (3.12 m)
- Airfoil: USA-5
- Empty weight: 1,500 lb (680 kg)
- Gross weight: 2,600 lb (1,179 kg)
- Fuel capacity: 45 gal
- Powerplant: 1 × Hall-Scott A-5A , 135 hp (101 kW)
- Propellers: 3-bladed Paragon

Performance

- Cruise speed: 83 kn (95 mph, 153 km/h)
- Endurance: 4 hours
