= Handley Page V/1500 =

British WWI Heavy-Bomber

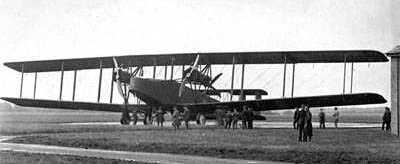

General information
- Type: Heavy bomber
- Manufacturer: Handley Page
- Designer: George Rudolph Volkert
- Primary user: Royal Air Force
- Number built: 32-40 (Note: Contracts were cancelled due to the Armistice and production stopped, sources differ as to the actual number completed, they vary between 32 and 40)

History
- Introduction date: 1918
- First flight: 22 May 1918

The Handley Page V/1500 was a British night-flying heavy bomber built by Handley Page towards the end of the First World War. It was a large four-engined biplane, which resembled a larger version of Handley Page's earlier O/100 and O/400 bombers, intended to bomb Berlin from East Anglian airfields. The end of the war stopped the V/1500 being used against Germany. In late 1918, one aircraft was used for the first flight from England to India. In 1919, it bombed Kabul during the Third Anglo-Afghan War. It was colloquially known within the fledgling Royal Air Force as the "Super Handley". A V/1500 was shipped to Canada in early 1919 to attempt a transatlantic flight.

== Development and design ==
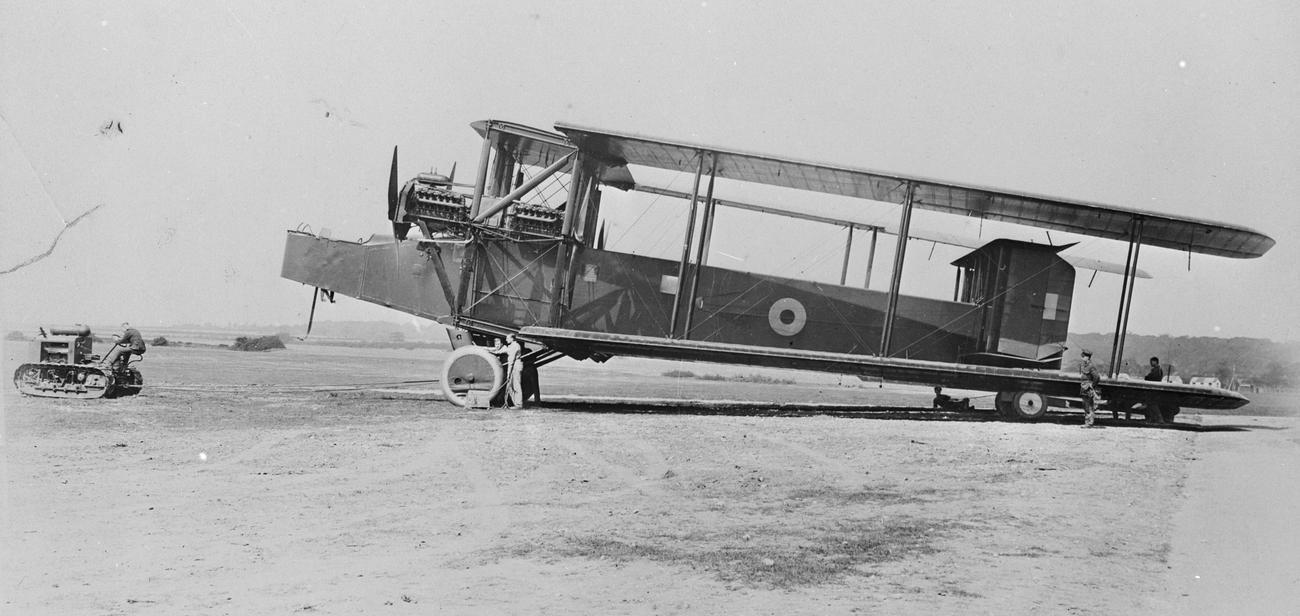
Handley Page V/1500 with wings folded

The V/1500 was produced to meet a 1917 British Air Board requirement for a large night bomber capable of reaching deeper into Germany than the Handley Page O/100 which had recently entered service, carrying a 3,000 lb (1,400 kg) bombload. It was thus capable of bombing Berlin from bases in East Anglia.

While the V/1500 had a similar fuselage to that of the O/400, it had longer-span, four-bay biplane wings and was powered by four 375 hp (280 kW) Rolls-Royce Eagle VIII engines mounted in two nacelles, with two engines pulling in the conventional manner and two pushing, rather than the two Eagle engines of the smaller bomber. Construction was of wood and fabric materials. A relatively novel design feature was the gunner's position at the extreme rear of the fuselage, between the four fins.

Owing to pressure of work at Handley Page's Cricklewood factory and to ensure security, the first prototype was constructed by Harland and Wolff at Belfast, Northern Ireland, being assembled at Cricklewood and first flying on 22 May 1918. Orders were placed with a number of companies (including Harland and Wolff, Beardmore, Handley Page, Grahame-White and Alliance Aircraft for a total of 210 V/1500s at £12,500 apiece, although only 40 aircraft were completed, with a further 22 produced as spares. The Beardmore order was for fifty machines in two batches, the first batch was for 20 and the second batch for 30. The company accounts state production continued into 1921.The test pilot for Beardmore was Clifford Prodger and the aircraft were delivered from Inchinnan Aerodrome.

== Service ==
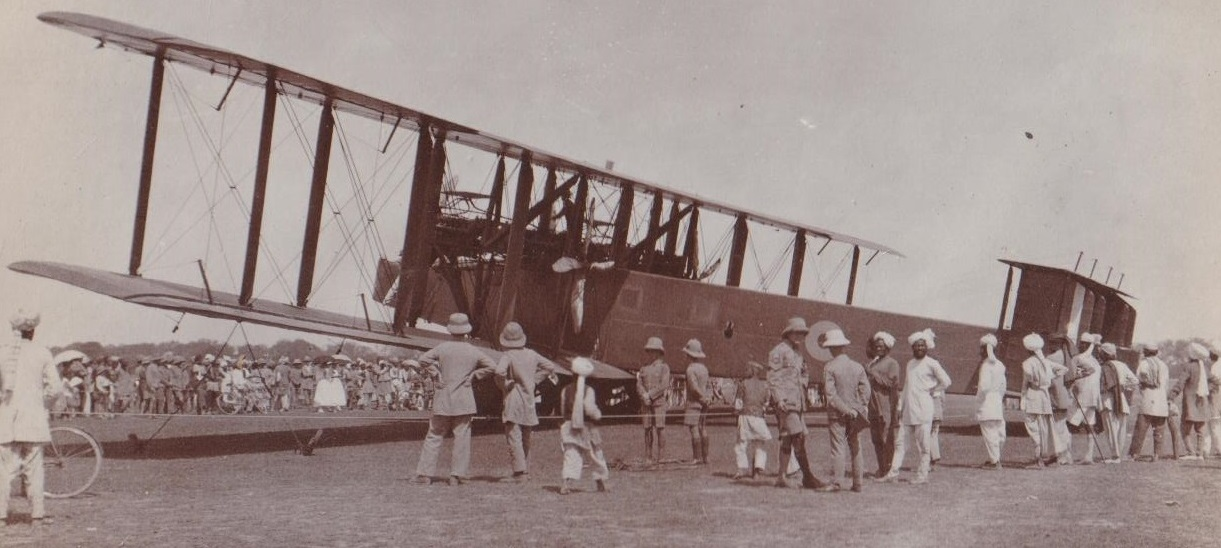
Handley Page V1500, J1936 at Ambala, India, 1919; 130km SE of Rissalpur, from where it bombed Kabul; showing side windows removed & mechanic)

Three aircraft were delivered to No. 166 Squadron at RAF Bircham Newton (Norfolk) during October 1918. The squadron commander did not receive clear orders for his mission until 8 November, due to debate at high level. A mission was scheduled for that night (to bomb Berlin, fly on to Prague as the Austro-Hungarian forces had surrendered by then, refuel, re-arm, and bomb Düsseldorf on the way back). No mission was flown - a technical expert insisted that all the engines on one aircraft be changed. The same happened the following day (but with a different aircraft). The three aircraft were about to taxi out after the second set of engine changes when an excited ground crew member ran out to stop them — the armistice had just been declared.

One of the original batch of aircraft (serial J1936, Old Carthusian) went on to record two significant 'firsts'. On 13 December 1918, the bomber, flown by Major A.C.S. Maclaren and Captain Robert Halley, accompanied by Brigadier-general N.D.K. MacEwen, made the first ever 'through-flight' from England to India. Taking off from Britain the aircraft flew via Rome, Malta, Cairo, and Baghdad, finally reaching Karachi on 15 January 1919.

The same aircraft played a pivotal role in ending the Third Anglo-Afghan War. On 25 May 1919, flying from Risalpur piloted by Captain Halley and with Lt E. Villiers as observer, the V/1500 reached Kabul in three hours. Of its payload of four 112 lb (51 kg) bombs on improvised bomb racks removed from B.E.2cs and 16 20 lb (10 kg) bombs carried in the fuselage and dropped by hand, four bombs hit the royal palace. Although the bombing did little physical damage, it had a great psychological impact on the citizens - the ladies of the royal harem rushed onto the streets in terror, causing great scandal. A few days later King Amanullah sued for peace, bringing an end to the war after less than one month of hostilities. J1936 ended its life being consumed by termites.

The Handley Page V/1500 aircraft Atlantic was shipped to Newfoundland in early 1919 to attempt the first non-stop Transatlantic flight. However, the prize was won by Alcock and Brown in a Vickers Vimy in June 1919. The crew departed for New York City but was forced to land in Parrsboro, Nova Scotia, on 5 July 1919 where it was repaired over the course of the summer. The Atlantic continued to New York on 9 October 1919 carrying with it the first airmail from Canada to the United States.

They were eventually replaced in service by the Vickers Vimy.

== Survivors ==
No complete example of the V/1500 remains. The Royal Air Force Museum Cosford holds several relics in store, including three propellers, four sections of tailplane and a compass

== Operators ==
United Kingdom

- Royal Air Force
  - No. 166 Squadron RAF
  - No. 167 Squadron RAF
  - No. 274 Squadron RAF

== Specifications (V/1500) ==
Data from Jane's Fighting Aircraft of World War I

General characteristics

- Crew: 8-9
- Length: 64 ft 0 in (19.51 m)
- Wingspan: 126 ft 0 in (38.40 m)
- Height: 23 ft 0 in (7.01 m)
- Wing area: 2,800 sq ft (260 m^{2})
- Empty weight: 15,000 lb (6,804 kg)
- Gross weight: 30,000 lb (13,608 kg)
- Fuel capacity: 1,000 imp gal (1,201 US gal; 4,546 L)
- Powerplant: 4 × Rolls-Royce Eagle VIII V-12 water-cooled piston engines, 375 hp (280 kW) each

- Alternative engines:

- 4x 500 hp (373 kW) Galloway Atlantic
- 4x 450 hp (336 kW) Napier Lion
- 4x 400 hp (298 kW) Liberty L-12

- Propellers: 2-bladed wooden fixed pitch tractor propellers (x2), 13 ft 5 in (4.09 m) diameter , driven at 1,080 rpm.

4-bladed wooden fixed-pitch pusher propellers (x2), 10 ft 4 in (3.1 m) diameter, driven at 1,080 rpm.

Performance

- Maximum speed: 103 mph (166 km/h, 90 kn) at sea level

99 mph (86 kn; 159 km/h) at 6,500 ft (1,981 m)
95 mph (83 kn; 153 km/h) at 10,000 ft (3,048 m)

- Landing speed: 50 mph (43 kn; 80 km/h)
- Endurance: 14 hours
- Time to altitude:

- 5,000 ft (1,524 m) in 8 minutes
- 10,000 ft (3,048 m) in 21 minutes

- Wing loading: 10 lb/sq ft (49 kg/m^{2})
- Power/mass: 0.0476 hp/lb (0.0783 kW/kg)

Armament

- Guns: 3 × .303 in (7.70 mm) Lewis guns, in nose, dorsal and tail positions
- Bombs: Up to 7,500 lb (3,400 kg) of bombs: 30 × 250 lb (113 kg) carried internally

== See also ==
Related development

- Handley Page Type O

Aircraft of comparable role, configuration, and era

- Zeppelin-Staaken R.VI
- Tarrant Tabor

Related lists

- List of bomber aircraft
