= Galloway Atlantic =

British WWI aircraft engine

Atlantic
- Type: Water-cooled V12 aero engine
- National origin: United Kingdom
- Manufacturer: William Beardmore and Company
- First run: 1918
- Major applications: Handley Page V/1500
- Number built: 72
- Developed from: Galloway Adriatic

The Galloway Atlantic is a 500 hp V12 aircraft engine that was ordered into production toward the end of World War I. It was developed as a V12 configuration of the inline-six Galloway Adriatic, with two Adriatic cylinder banks mounted on a single crankcase.

The Atlantic saw postwar service in Handley Page V/1500 bombers built by Galloway’s parent company, William Beardmore & Co. In contemporary publications the type was often referred to as the Beardmore, or BHP, Atlantic or 500 hp.

In the United States, Galloway Atlantic engines were fitted to the Remington Burnelli RB-2, which was, at the time, the world’s largest commercial freight aircraft. These engines were also a popular choice for smugglers operating fast boats during the prohibition era.

== Design and development ==
The Galloway Atlantic's articulated connecting rods

The Galloway Atlantic is essentially a double form of the Galloway Adriatic with two banks of six cylinders set at 60 degrees working a single crankshaft. The articulated master-and-slave connecting rods allows corresponding cylinders in each row to be arranged directly opposite each other but, as implemented in the Atlantic, gives the 6-cylinder bank with the articulated rods a longer stroke than the opposing bank.

The cylinder heads on the Atlantic are made of cast iron in blocks of three. Cast iron cylinder head blocks had previously been tried on some Adriatic engines due to the difficulties of casting and machining aluminum.

800 engines were ordered from Beardmore’s subsidiary companies; Arrol-Johnston and Galloway Engineering. Most were cancelled when WW1 ended. Only 72 engines were completed all of these being built at Galloway's factory in Kirkcudbright near Dumfries, Scotland. Marketing for the engine was inconsistent with the manufacturer being shown as either Galloway, or Beardmore, or BHP and the model being given as either Atlantic or 500 hp. (Note: There were also double forms of the Siddeley Puma known as the Siddeley Pacific and Siddeley Tiger. The Puma and Adriatic engines were based on the same design and had a closely interlinked development and production history.)

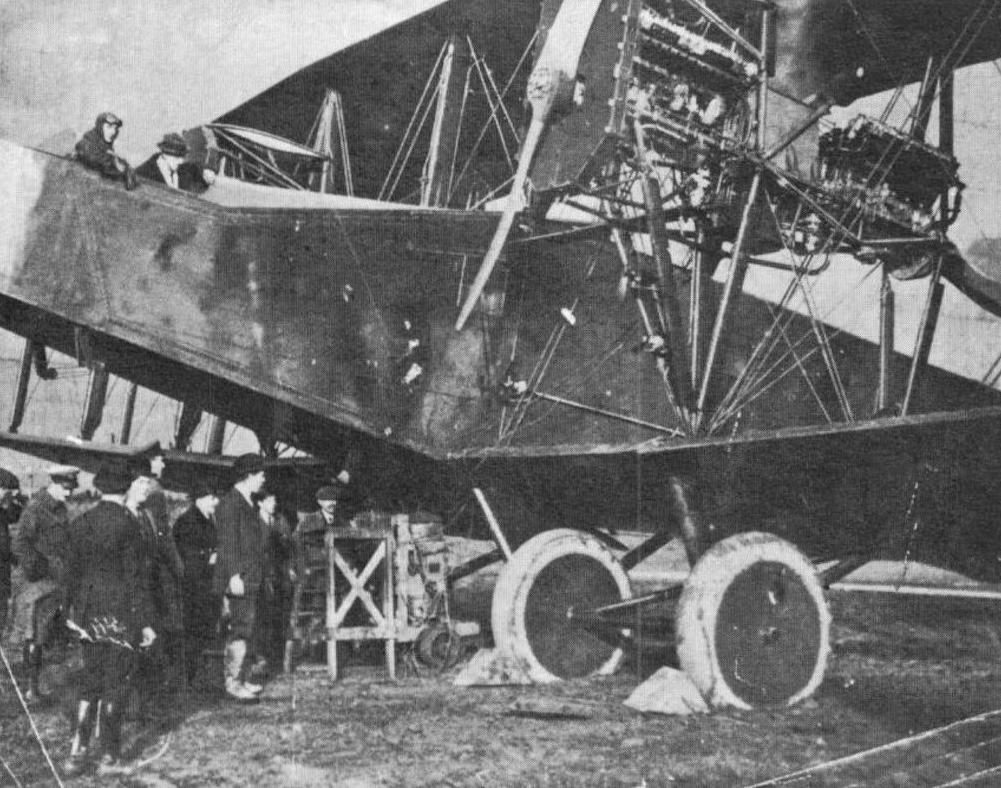
Paired Galloway Atlantic engines in a Handley Page V1500 bomber built at Beardmore's works

Aircraft number E8287 was the first of the Beardmore built Handley Page V/1500s and was fitted with four Galloway Atlantic engines. The aircraft had been handed over to the Royal Air Force by December of 1918. The Atlantic engines can be distinguished from the Rolls Royce Eagle engines, which were also in use on the V/1500, by the absence of exhaust pipes. The Atlantic was the most powerful engine fitted to the Handley Page V/1500 heavy bomber and was one of the most powerful aero-engines of its time.

In the United States, Galloway Atlantic engines were fitted to the Remington Burnelli RB-2 lifting body cargo aircraft. These engines also powered fast motorboats operated on the Great Lakes by Chicago-based rum-runners during the prohibition era.

The Atlantic was the last aircraft engine type manufactured by Galloway with the factory switching over to automobile production during the 1920s.

== Applications ==
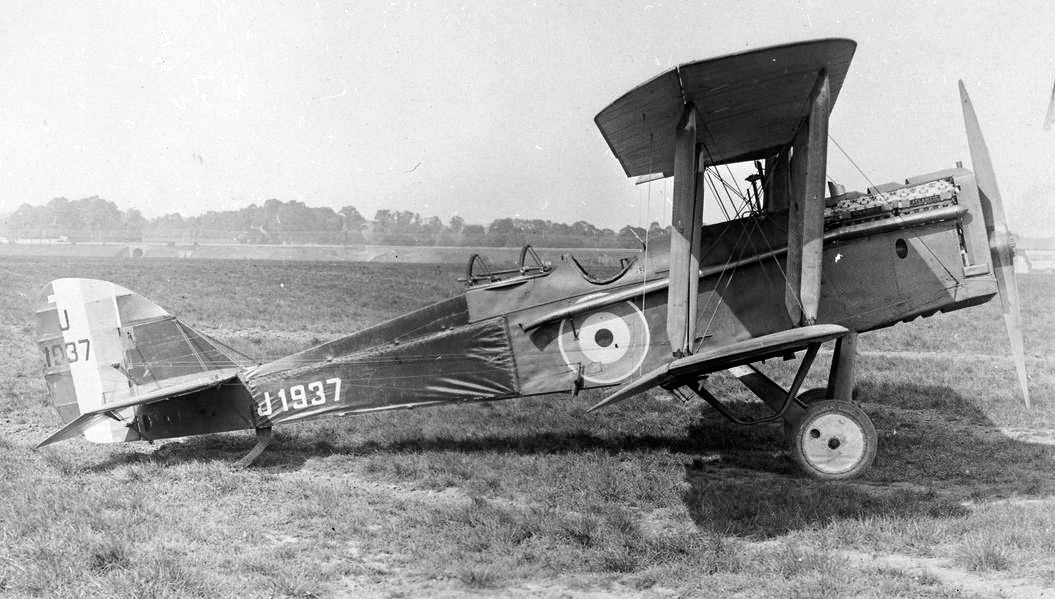
De Havilland DH.15 Gazelle, used as an engine testbed for the Galloway Atlantic

- De Havilland DH.15
- Handley Page V/1500
- Remington Burnelli RB-2
- Motorboats

== Engines on display ==
A preserved Galloway Atlantic engine is on display at the Frontiers of Flight Museum in Dallas, Texas. The engine is on loan from the University of Texas at Dallas.

== Specifications ==
Data from Angle & Lumsden

=== General characteristics ===
- Type: Water–cooled, upright, V12 piston engine
- Bore: 5.71 in (145 mm)
- Stroke: 7.48 in (190 mm) and 7.95 in (202 mm) on side with articulated rods
- Displacement: 2,301 cu in (37.7 L)
- Length: 74.1 in (1,882 mm)
- Width: 34.17 in (868 mm)
- Height: 43.5 in (1,105 mm)
- Dry weight: 1,210 lb (549 kg)

=== Components ===
- Valvetrain: One intake + two exhaust valves per cylinder
- Fuel system: Two carburetors mounted in the Vee between the cylinder banks
- Fuel type: Gasoline
- Oil system: Dry sump. Vacuum distilled mineral oil.
- Cooling system: Water-cooled
- Reduction gear: None. Direct drive.

=== Performance ===
- Power output: 500 hp (373 kW) @ 1500 rpm (rated)
- Compression ratio: 4.9:1
- Specific fuel consumption: 0.53 lb/(hp⋅h) (0.322 kg/kWh)
- Oil consumption: 0.068 lb/(hp⋅h) (0.041 kg/kWh)
- Power-to-weight ratio: 0.417 hp/lb (0.686 kW/kg) at rated

== See also ==
Related development

- Siddeley Pacific
- Siddeley Tiger

Comparable engines

- Liberty L-12
- Napier Lion
- Renault 12Fe
- Rolls-Royce Eagle

Related lists

- List of aircraft engines
