= SAB AB-20 =

1930s French bomber aircraft

AB-21
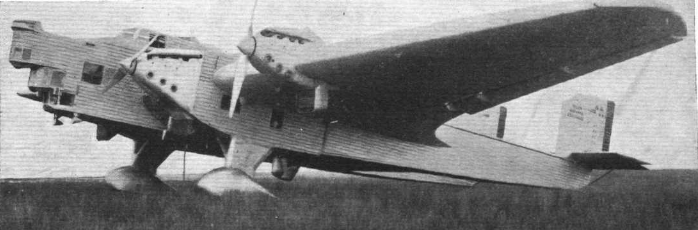
- SAB AB-21

General information
- Type: Heavy night bomber
- National origin: France
- Manufacturer: Société Aérienne Bordelaise (SAB)
- Number built: 1 AB-20 + 1 AB-21

History
- First flight: 15 January 1932
- Developed from: Dyle et Bacalan DB-70

The SAB AB-20 was a large four engine twin boom French bomber built in the early 1930s as a development of the Dyle et Bacalan DB-70 airliner. It featured a lifting body of thick airfoil section between the inner engines. It was later modified for the attack role; a second aircraft, the AB-21, had different engines and cleaner aerodynamics but no more were built.

== Design ==
The SAB AB-20 was a four-engine night bomber development of the three-engine Dyle et Bacalan DB-70 airliner. The change of manufacturer's name was the result of the financial failure of Dyle et Bacalan in 1929, followed by its immediate reappearance as SAB, who took over DB-70 development. The latter was built around a thick, wide chord airfoil centre section which provided generous internal space for passengers. The engines were mounted on this structure as were twin fuselages to carry the tail. The outer wings were of normal thickness and chord, and the cockpit and undercarriage were also attached to the centre section. The generous intra-wing volume equally offered crew, fuel and bomb-room for military purposes. Initially the AB-20 was intended to have three engines like its predecessor, but during the design phase there was a military request for a bombardier's position and a gunner's cockpit in the nose, which required the removal of the centre engine and its replacement by two extra engines wing-mounted outboard of the centre section.

Apart from the extra engines and the very different crew compartment, together with the removal of passenger accommodation, the AB-20 and DB-70 had much in common: the thick centre section and high-mounted outer wings, twin fuselages carrying a long horizontal stabilizer, and twin fins and rudders. Both aircraft had conventional undercarriages with pairs of mainwheels widely separated on V-struts attached to the lower longerons of the centre section.

The new central crew pod was flat-sided and tapered forwards to a complicated cylindrical nose, formed by a simple lower part with an overhanging, windowed cabin for the navigator/bombardier and an open gunner's cockpit, fitted with a machine gun ring, directly above. The nose also carried a long, conical probe with fine extensions, possibly pressure sensors. Further aft there was an enclosed pilot's cabin. A second gunner was stationed rearwards, on top of the centre section and a third fired from a ventral turret.

== Development ==
The first flight of the AB-20 was on 15 January 1932. The following year it was reported that it had been structurally modified for the attack role and was returning to Villacoublay for tests.

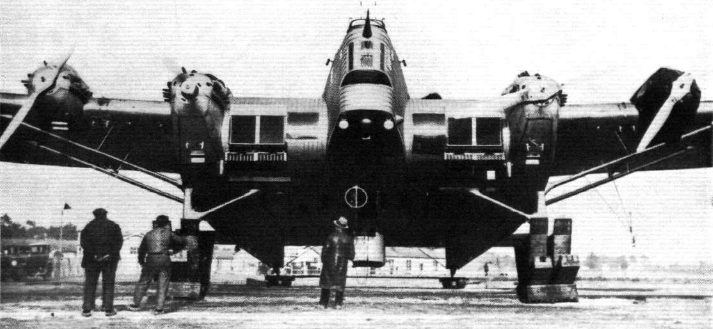
AB-20 in 1932

By early 1934 a much developed version, the AB-21 had appeared. It had the newer V-12 Lorraine Petrel water-cooled engines and a tapered, filleted cantilever wing without the struts used on the AB-20 and DB-70. The undercarriage had also been cleaned up with streamlined legs and wheels in long cowlings. The nose was further complicated, retaining the upper, open gunner's position but now with double underhanging windowed positions, though the conical probe had gone.

Trials of an airborne sideways-firing 75 mm gun were carried out with the AB-20 prototype modified as the AB-22. Firing trials were halted after damage was caused to the lower wing skin by blast from the gun muzzle.

== Variants ==
SAB AB-20
A four-engined bomber derived from the three-engined Dyle et Bacalan DB-70, powered by four 493 hp (368 kW) Lorraine 12Fb Courlis engines.
SAB AB-21
Similar to the AB-20 and DB-70 but with cantilevered wings and powered by four 493 hp (368 kW) Lorraine 12Ha Pétrel engines.
SAB AB-22
The sole prototype AB-20, with a crew of five, modified with a 75 mm gun firing sideways. Test firing took place at Cazaux in September 1934, but was terminated after five rounds had been fired due to structural damage to the lower wing skin.

== Specifications (AB-21) ==
Data from

General characteristics

- Crew: 5
- Length: 21.9 m (71 ft 10 in)
- Wingspan: 36.7 m (120 ft 5 in)
- Height: 6.84 m (22 ft 5 in)
- Wing area: 201 m^{2} (2,160 sq ft) including the central body area of 88 m^{2} (950 sq ft)
- Empty weight: 8,450 kg (18,629 lb)
- Gross weight: 13,250 kg (29,211 lb)
- Fuel capacity: 1,295 kg (2,855 lb) in four tanks
- Powerplant: 4 × Lorraine 12Ha Pétrel V-12 water-cooled piston engines, 370 kW (500 hp) each
- Propellers: 2-bladed

Performance

- Maximum speed: 198 km/h (123 mph, 107 kn) at sea level
- 205 km/h (111 kn; 127 mph) at 2,000 m (6,600 ft)
- 210 km/h (110 kn; 130 mph) at 3,500 m (11,500 ft)
- Cruise speed: 175 km/h (109 mph, 94 kn) to 185 km/h (100 kn; 115 mph)
- Range: 1,000 km (620 mi, 540 nmi)
- Service ceiling: 5,500 m (18,000 ft)
- Time to altitude: * 1,000 m (3,300 ft) in 5 minutes
- 2,000 m (6,600 ft) in 11 minutes
- 3,000 m (9,800 ft) in 17 minutes
- 4,000 m (13,000 ft) in 25 minutes
- 5,000 m (16,000 ft) in 40 minutes
- Wing loading: 67 kg/m^{2} (14 lb/sq ft)
- Power/mass: 0.11 kW/kg (0.0672 hp/lb)[all figures estimated]

Armament

- Guns: 3x 7.7 mm (0.303 in) Lewis machine guns
- Bombs: maximum load 2,500 kg (5,500 lb) of bombs

== See also ==
Related lists

- List of bomber aircraft
- List of Interwar military aircraft

== Bibliography ==
- Borget, Michel (March 1970). "Les "Burnelli" français: le DB 70 et sa progeniture (2)" [The French "Burnelli"s: The DB 70 and Its Offspring, Part 2]. Le Album de Fanatique de l'Aviation (in French) (9): 24–26. ISSN 0757-4169.
- Borget, Michel (April 1970). "Les "Burnelli" français: progéniture du DB 70; l'AB 20 (3)" [The French "Burnelli"s: The Offspring of the DB 70, the AB 20, Part 3]. Le Album de Fanatique de l'Aviation (in French) (10): 24–26. ISSN 0757-4169.
- Borget, Michel (May 1970). "Les "Burnelli" français: le AB 20, AB 21 et AB 22... (4)" [The French "Burnelli"s: The AB 20, AB 21 and AB 22..., Part 4]. Le Album de Fanatique de l'Aviation (in French) (11): 24–27. ISSN 0757-4169.
