= Passenger compartment =

Passenger compartment or passenger cabin may refer to any of these areas designated for passengers in vehicles:

- In automobile passenger cars, the area of the vehicle physically separated from the engine compartment, trunk or boot, etc., usually including the driver
  - In limousines, the passenger compartment excluding the driver area
- In fixed-wing aircraft and other aircraft, a passenger area physically separated from the cockpit
- In railway cars, the area designed for passengers
- In ships and boats, an area designed for passengers that is physically separated from the bridge and other areas
  - Compartment (ship), an area as above that is generally structurally separate and often watertight from non-passenger areas
  - Passenger cabin (ship), a room or suite designed for one or a few passengers; a stateroom

== See also ==
- Passenger car (disambiguation)
