= Burnelli RB-1 =

1920s American airliner prototype

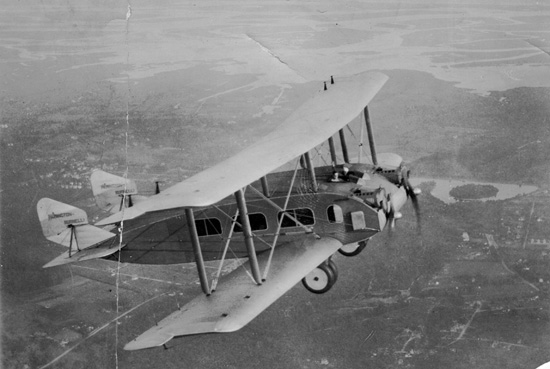

General information
- Type: Passenger aircraft
- National origin: United States of America
- Manufacturer: Burnelli
- Number built: 1

History
- First flight: 21 June 1921
- Developed into: Burnelli RB-2

The Burnelli RB-1 was a US twin engine biplane airliner prototype from 1920, incorporating a lifting body fuselage.

== Design and development ==
The Burnelli RB-1, often known as the Remington-Burnelli Airliner, was an American passenger biplane from 1920, designed by Vincent Burnelli. It incorporated Burnelli's lifting-body design. Following several more conventional designs during the WWI years, Burnelli came up with the idea of a lifting body: an airfoil-shaped fuselage that could be used to generate up to 50% of the lift, improving performance, due to reduced wing area and fuel consumption.

The RB-1's body contributed about 27% of the total lifting area and was designed to support about 15% of its weight. The fuselage was built around plywood frames and was clad in corrugated duralumin. The two pilots were situated in a pair of open cockpits, each with a mechanic seated by his side. Its pair of Liberty engines were immediately in front of these cockpits, largely buried in the leading edge of the body but accessible from the cockpits. The body width of 14 ft (4.27 m) placed the engines only 10 ft 4 in (3.15 m) apart, with about 1 in (25 mm) clearance between propeller tips. The cabin housed up to 30 passengers. At the fixed "trailing edge" of the fuselage small twin fins mounted above its sides carried balanced rudders and short, mid-fuselage mounted tailplanes carried balanced elevators.

It was a single bay equal span biplane, with simple parallel interplane struts and without stagger. The wings were wooden structures, fabric covered. The ailerons carried on both upper and lower wings had prominent tip balances.

The RB-1 flew for the first time on 21 June 1921 from Curtiss Field, Long Island, piloted by Bert Acosta and William P. Sullivan. Its performance was considered acceptable. However, the first model produced was badly damaged while on the ground during a storm.

== Specifications ==
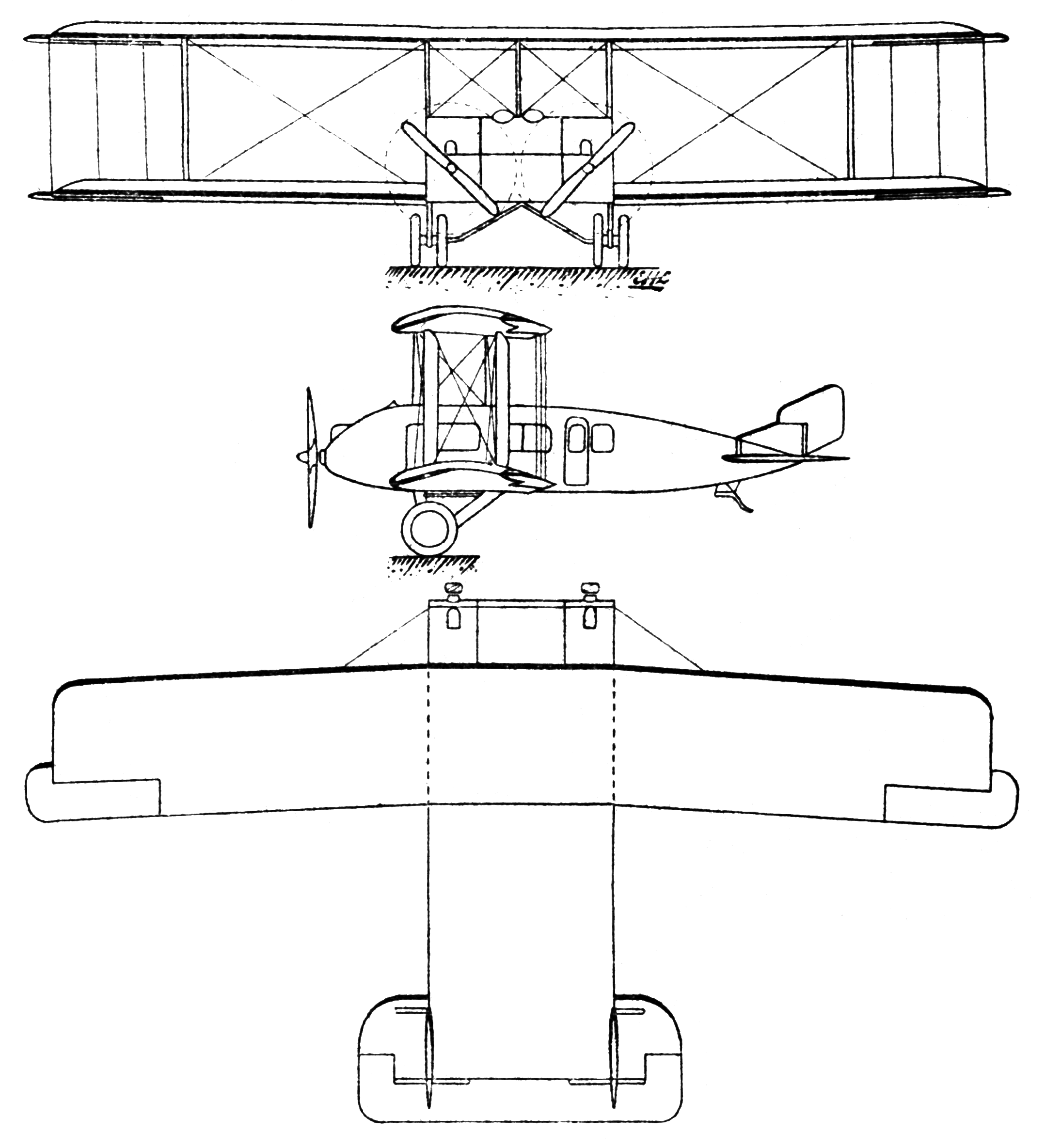
Remington-Burnelli Airliner 3-view drawing from Les Ailes December 15, 1921

Data from Flight 1921

General characteristics

- Crew: 2 pilots and 2 mechanics
- Capacity: 30 passengers
- Length: 41 ft 2 in (12.55 m)
- Upper wingspan: 74 ft 0 in (22.56 m)
- Lower wingspan: 74 ft 0 in (22.56 m)
- Height: 18 ft 0 in (5.49 m)
- Wing area: 1,827 sq ft (169.7 m^{2}) total, including 735 sq ft (68.3 m²) upper wing, 588 sq ft (54.6 m²) lower wing and 504 sq ft (46.8 m²) fuselage
- Airfoil: M-2
- Empty weight: 8,137 lb (3,691 kg)
- Gross weight: 14,637 lb (6,639 kg)
- Powerplant: 2 × Liberty XII V-12 liquid cooled, 400 hp (300 kW) each
- Propellers: 2-bladed, 5 ft 1.5 in (1.562 m) diameter

Performance

- Maximum speed: 110 mph (180 km/h, 96 kn)
- Cruise speed: 96 mph (154 km/h, 83 kn)
- Endurance: 8 hr
- Service ceiling: 14,000 ft (4,300 m)
- Rate of climb: 900 ft/min (4.6 m/s)
