= Lorraine Pétrel =

1930s French piston aircraft engine

12H Pétrel
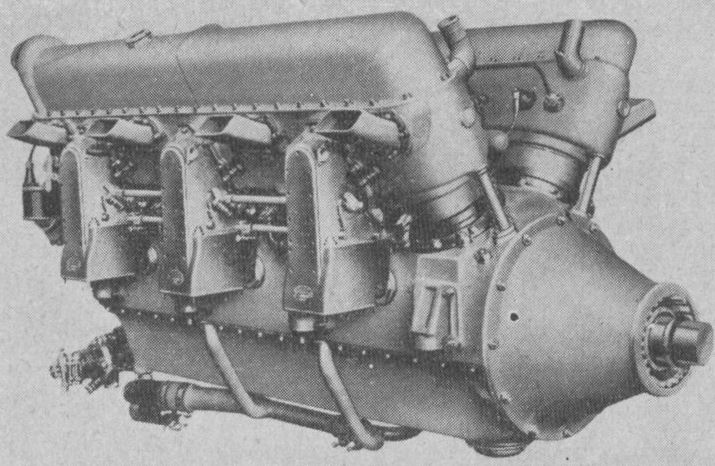
- Type: Upright water-cooled V12, supercharged and geared aircraft engine
- National origin: France
- Manufacturer: Société Lorraine, Argenteuil
- First run: 1932
- Major applications: Potez 542

The Lorraine 12H Pétrel was a French V12 supercharged, geared piston aircraft engine. It was produced by Société Lorraine, which in 1937 was nationalized as Société Nationale de Construction de Moteurs (SNCM).

During the 1930s, Société Lorraine continued its tradition of building large water-cooled aeroengines. These later engines were named after birds: Eider, Courlis (en:curlew), Pétrel, and Sterna. The last two remained in production in 1938. The Pétrel was initially rated at 370 kW (500 hp), but later developed to give 640 kW (860 hp). It powered a variety of mostly French aircraft in the mid-1930s, several on an experimental basis.

== Design and development ==
The Pétrel was an upright V12 engine with two banks of six cylinders, arranged at 60° to each other, driving a common crankshaft. The cylinder blocks were bolted onto the crankcase, all light alloy parts. The crankcase came in two pieces, with seven crankshaft bearings in the upper section. Roller bearings were used at the crankshaft ends; the remaining five were plain. The upper crankcase section also had integrally cast water channels as part of the cooling system.

Steel cylinder liners were screwed into the heads, with their lower parts projecting into the crankcase. Steel seats for valves and sparking plugs were shrunk into the heads. The pistons were forged from alugir, with three compression and one scraper ring and floating bronze bushes for the gudgeon pins. The twelve pistons were connected to the six crankpins in pairs, each with a master and an auxiliary connecting rod. The master rods had forked big ends with white metal bearings; the auxiliary rod ends ran between the forks on bronze bushes.

The Pétrel had four overhead valves per cylinder, two exhaust and two inlet, in bronze valve guides. Each bank had its own overhead camshaft and each cam operated a pair of valves through T-shaped tappets, the stem of the T moving in a guide to avoid sideways force on the valve stems. There were two spark plugs per cylinder and twin magnetos. A carburetor fed the mixture into the intake of the supercharger, at the rear of the engine. The Pétrel's output could be left or right handed; a Lorraine patent planet gearset, with six satellite gears, provided an 11:17 reduction of propeller shaft speed.

Engine lubrication was by forcing pressurized oil through the crankshaft, with sump scavenging. The supercharger had its own lubrication system.

First run in 1932, the early Pétrels produced only 370 kW (500 hp), but by 1938 the engine had been developed into the 12Hars model which gave 640 kW (860 hp).

== Operational history ==
Many of the aircraft types to use the Pétrel were one-offs, testing the Lorraine against better known engines from Hispano-Suiza and Rolls-Royce. The 12Hars model was used in the Koolhoven F.K.55 prototype fighter to drive a pair of counter-rotating twin-bladed propellers.

The Potez 542 (a version of the Potez 540) was built in numbers, with 74 of these twin-engined, multi-role (bomber, reconnaissance and transport) aircraft supplied to the French and Spanish air forces.

== Variants ==
12H Pétrel
Initial power 370 kW (500 hp).
12Ha
370 kW (500 hp)
12Hars
477 kW (640 hp).
12Hdr
370 kW (500 hp) at 2300 rpm
12Hdrs
536 kW (719 hp) at 2300 rpm
12Hfrs Normale
536 kW (719 hp).
12Hfrs Chasse
Designed for fighter aircraft produced higher powers, 567 kW (760 hp) at 2,800 rpm and 4,000 m (13,000 ft).
12Hgrs
608 kW (815 hp) at 2800 rpm

== Applications ==
- Breguet Br.19.10
- Fokker D.XVII
- Hawker Fury
- Hawker Hart
- Koolhoven F.K.55
- Nieuport-Delage NiD 82
- Potez 39
- Potez 542
- P.Z.L. P.8/II
- Renard R-31
- Société Aérienne Bordelaise AB-21
- French Motor Torpedo Boat Prototype 40K

== Engines on display ==
- A Pétrel is on display in the aircraft section of the Musée Royal de l'Armée, Brussels.

== Specifications (12Hfrs, Normale) ==
Data from Jane's all the World's aircraft 1938

=== General characteristics ===
- Type: Supercharged upright water-cooled 60° V12 piston engine
- Bore: 145 mm (5.71 in)
- Stroke: 145 mm (5.71 in)
- Displacement: 28.73 L (1,753 cu in)
- Length: 1,858 mm (73.15 in)
- Width: 707 mm (27.83 in)
- Height: 795 mm (31.30 in)
- Dry weight: with accessories 475 kg (1,047 lb)

=== Components ===
- Valvetrain: 4 spring-loaded valves per cylinder, driven in pairs via T-shaped tappets by cams on overhead camshafts, one per block
- Supercharger: centrifugal, driven at 8.8 crankshaft speed via epicyclic gears; independent lubrication with dedicated pressure and scavenge pumps
- Fuel system: single or double barrelled Lorraine carburettor at supercharger inlet, supplied by 2 A.M. fuel pumps
- Ignition system: 2 plugs per cylinder; 2 magnetos
- Fuel type: petrol
- Oil system: 1 pressure pump supplies oil via crankshaft, removed from sump by 2 scavenge pumps. Operating pressure 0.49 Mpa (71 psi)
- Cooling system: water
- Reduction gear: 17:11

=== Performance ===
- Power output: 536 kW (720 hp) rated at 2,650 rpm and 4,000 m (13,000 ft)
- Compression ratio: 6:1
- Specific fuel consumption: 315 g/(kW.h) (8.0 oz/(hp.h))
- Oil consumption: cruise 12±1 g/(kW.h) (0.33± 0.05 oz/(hp.h))
