= Dyle et Bacalan DB-10 =

1920s French bomber aircraft

DB-10
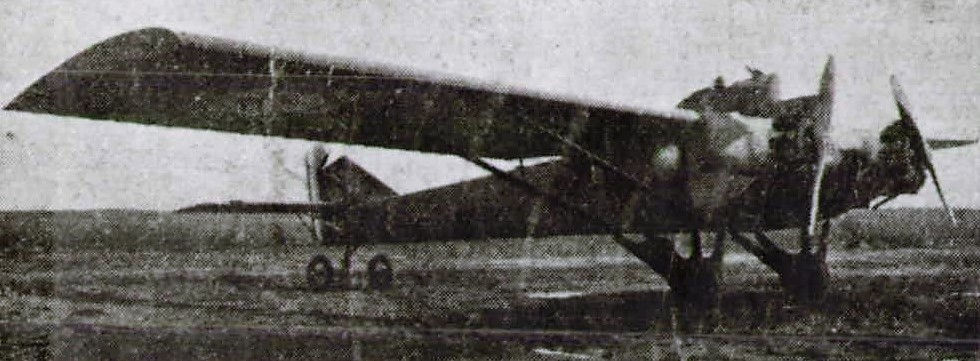

General information
- Type: Heavy night bomber
- National origin: France
- Manufacturer: Dyle et Bacalan, Bordeaux
- Number built: 1

History
- First flight: 1926

The Dyle et Bacalan DB-10 was a heavy night bomber, designed in France and flown in 1926. It was a twin engine, high wing, metal frame monoplane, distinguished by a very thick centre section wing which formed the forward fuselage and housed the engines.

== Design ==
In 1925 the well-established naval ship builders Société Anonyme de Travaux Dyle et Bacalan, based in Bordeaux, developed an aircraft manufacturing interest. Their first production was a high wing, twin engine heavy bomber, the DB-10. Like their later aircraft, the DB-10 was structurally an all-metal machine. In most respects the DB-10 was a conventional design for its day but it had one feature, a very thick wing centre section blended into the fuselage, which was also to become a characteristic of later Dyle et Bacalan aircraft.

At the front of the DB-10 the thick aerofoil centre section stretched unbroken between the engines, which were mounted upon it. Beyond the engines outer wings of normal thickness and constant chord, significantly thinner and narrower than the inboard section, were each supported by a pair of parallel struts to the lower edge of the centre section. Wing spars and struts were made of steel tubing, with duralumin ribs. A conventional, rectangular section, fuselage with duralumin longerons emerged from the centre section as the thick aerofoil thinned, carrying a tailplane on its upper surface, braced from below. It also carried a single fin and a deep rudder, which moved in a cut-out between the elevators. All surfaces, except those housing the uncowled Gnome-built Bristol Jupiter radial engines, were fabric. The DB-10 had a fixed, conventional undercarriage with each single, partly cowled, mainwheel mounted on a parallel pair of V-shaped struts behind the engines. The outer pair of struts was fixed close to the lower ends of the wing struts, at the edge of the thick aerofoil. A tailwheel was mounted at the rear of the fuselage, just in front of the rudder.

The thick centre section enclosed vertical bomb racks as well as fuel tanks. Open cockpits for the crew were built on top of it, starting with a navigator/bombardier's or gunner's position at the extreme leading edge. Immediately behind but stepped above it was the pilot's cockpit, with another cockpit just aft where the raised crew housing ended. There was a separate dorsal gunner's position, fitted with a gun ring, on the fuselage proper.

== Operational history ==
The DB-10 was entered into the 1926 French government BN3 competition for a new three man night bomber, held at Villacoublay where it flew against such aircraft as the Amiot 122, the Farman F.123, the Latécoère 19 and the eventual winner the Lioré et Olivier LéO 20. Only one DB-10 was built, though the company persisted with the thick wing idea in its later DB-70 transport aircraft.

== Specifications ==
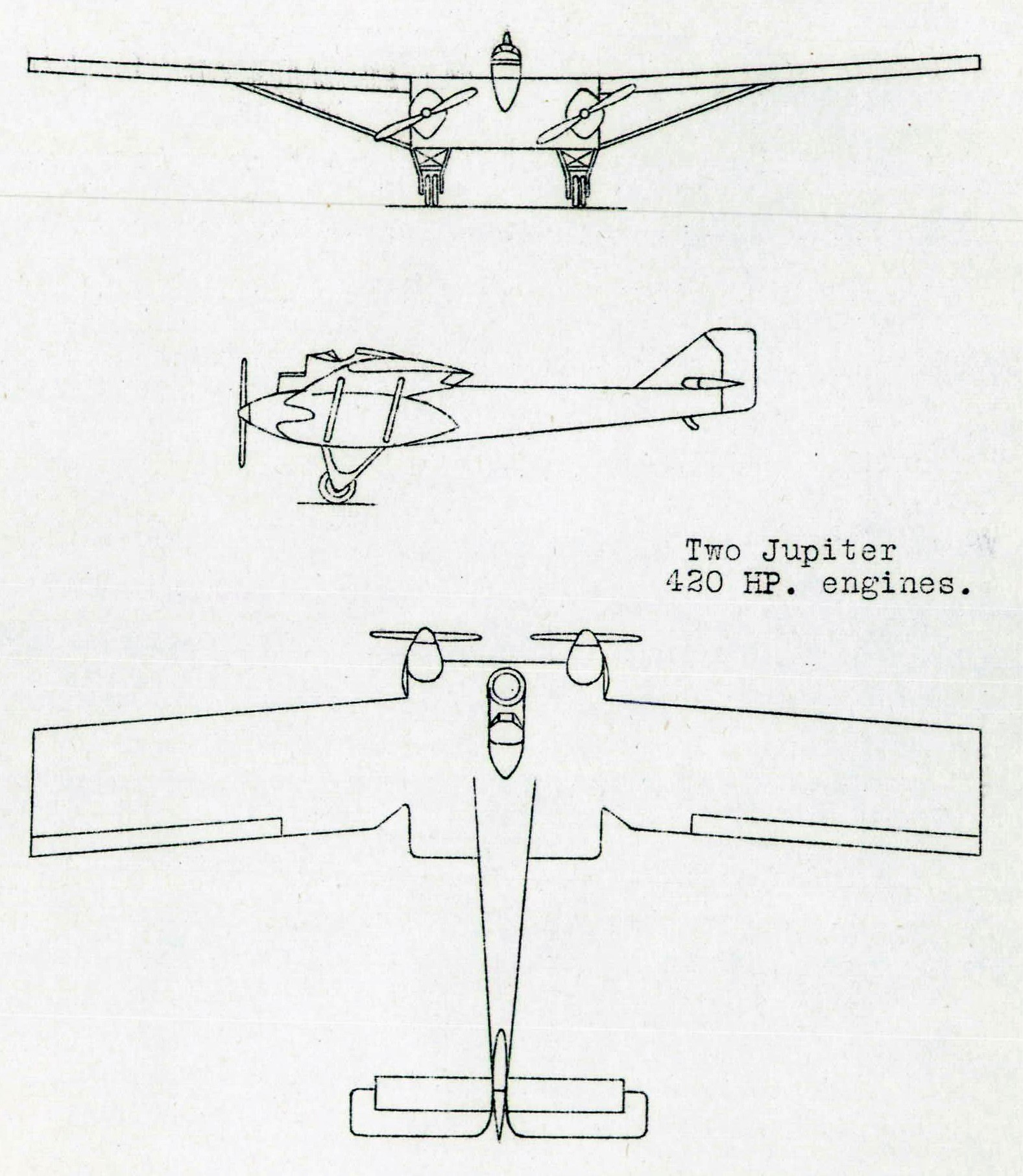
Dyle et Bacalan DB-10 3-view drawing from NACA Aircraft Circular No.27

Data from Flight December 1926, Air International:Plane Facts: The French "Burnelli", Aviafrance:Dyle et Bacalan DB-10, Jane's all the World's Aircraft 1928

General characteristics

- Crew: 3/4
- Length: 13.60 m (44 ft 7 in)
- Wingspan: 25 m (82 ft 0 in)
- Height: 3.80 m (12 ft 6 in)
- Wing area: 93.0 m^{2} (1,001 sq ft)
- Empty weight: 3,150 kg (6,945 lb)
- Gross weight: 5,600 kg (12,346 lb)
- Powerplant: 2 × Gnome et Rhône 9A Jupiter 9-cylinder radial, 360 kW (480 hp) each
- Propellers: 2-bladed fixed pitch wooden propellers

Performance

- Maximum speed: 195 km/h (121 mph, 105 kn) at sea level

173 km/h (107 mph; 93 kn) at 4,000 m (13,000 ft)

- Service ceiling: 5,500 m (18,000 ft)
- Wing loading: 60.1 kg/m^{2} (12.3 lb/sq ft)
- Power/mass: 0.1126 kW/kg (0.0685 hp/lb)

Armament

- Guns: 2× 7.7 mm (0.303 in) Lewis guns in nose gunner's position
- Bombs: 1,300 kg (2,900 lb) bombs in internal bomb bay
