= William Whitney Christmas =

American physician and aviator

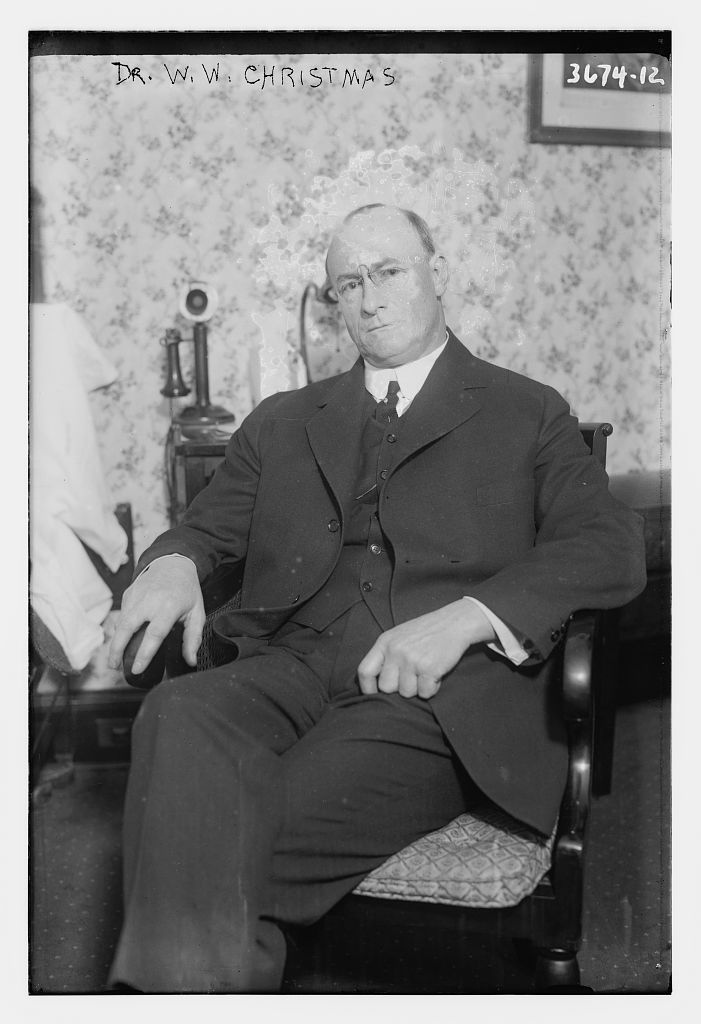
- Christmas in 1915
- Born: September 1, 1865; Warrenton, North Carolina, U.S.
- Died: April 14, 1960 (aged 94); Bellevue Hospital; Manhattan, New York City, U.S.
- Education: St. John's Military Academy; University of Virginia (BS, MS); George Washington University (MD)
- Occupations: Physician; Aviator
- Spouse: May Norris (m. 1899)
- Children: 1

William Whitney Christmas, M.D. (September 1, 1865 – April 14, 1960) was one of many claimants for an early design of the aileron. He was a vice-president of the General Development Corporation.

== Biography ==
Christmas was born on September 1, 1865, in Warrenton, North Carolina, to James Yancey Christmas and Rhoda Whitney. He attended the St. John's Military Academy then the University of Virginia where he obtained a bachelor's degree and a master's degree. He graduated from George Washington University in 1905 with an M.D.

He married May Norris in 1899 in Maryland, and they had as their son, Whitney Norris Christmas.

He developed the Christmas Bullet airplane in 1918 which had sprung steel wing spars, which crashed on its maiden flight after the wings tore themselves from the fuselage, killing the pilot. He then built a second example which also crashed on its maiden flight, again killing the pilot.

In retirement he was still proposing improbable aeroplane designs.

He died at Bellevue Hospital in Manhattan, New York City, of pneumonia on April 14, 1960.

== Aircraft ==
Aircraft designed or developed by Christmas, most of which never left the drawing board, but were supposed to introduce various aviation patents. It is unlikely that any of them other than the Bullet ever flew. (1910: (Dr William Whitney) Christmas Aeroplane Co, Washington DC. c.1912: Durham Christmas Aeroplane Sales & Exhibition Co. 1918: Cantilever Aero Co, Copiague, NY.)

- Christmas Red Bird 1909 biplane
- Christmas Red Bird II 1910 biplane
- Christmas 1912 pusher biplane
- Christmas 1913 tractor biplane
- Christmas 1915 biplane
- Christmas Aerial Express
- Christmas Bullet
