= Remington Burnelli RB-2 =

American prototype lifting-body airliner of 1924

RB-2
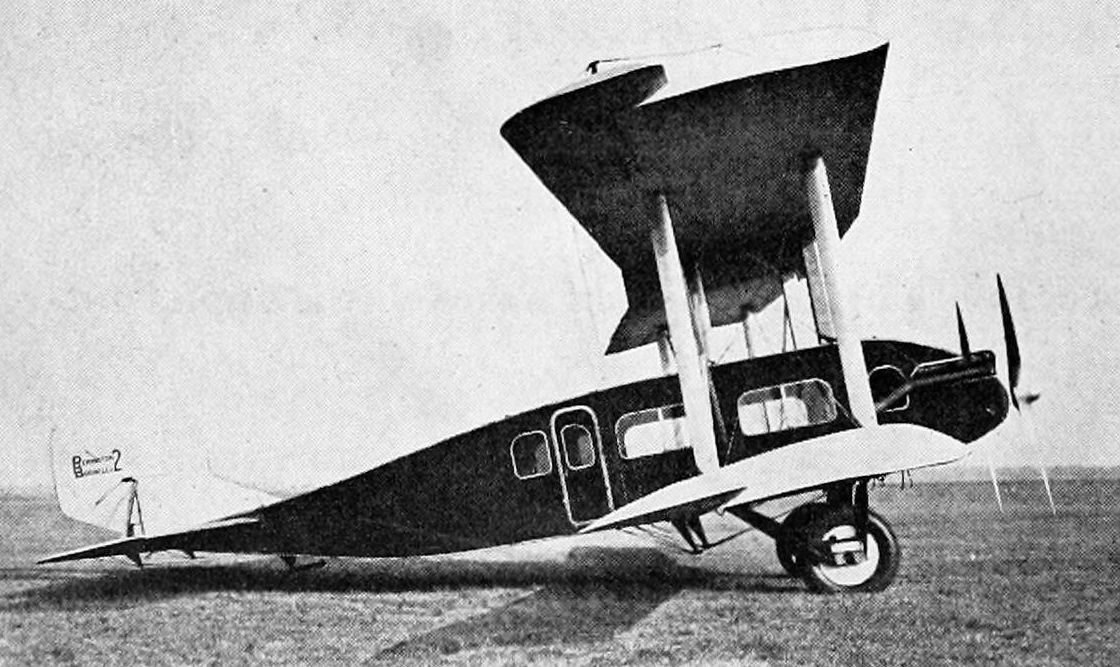

General information
- Type: Biplane freighter
- National origin: United States
- Manufacturer: Burnelli
- Designer: Vincent Burnelli
- Number built: 1

History
- First flight: 1924
- Developed from: Burnelli RB-1

The Remington Burnelli RB-2 was a 1920s American twin-engined biplane freighter or airliner, designed by Vincent Burnelli with a lifting body fuselage. At the time it was the world's largest commercial freighter. It was the first aircraft to carry a motor car inside its fuselage.

== Design and development ==
The RB-2 was based on the earlier RB-1 airliner, it had improved control surfaces and was powered by two 650 hp Galloway Atlantic piston engines. It had a corrugated metal construction with a dural skin giving it an empty weight of 5 tons. The passenger cabin could be fitted with 25 seats or used for freight.

In 1925 the aircraft was used by the Hudson Motor Car Company as a flying showroom for the Essex automobile.

== Specifications ==
Data from "The Remington–Burnelli Airliner" 1926, p.506, and as noted

General characteristics

- Length: 134 ft 6 in (41 m)
- Wingspan: 78 ft (24 m)
- Wing area: 1,517 sq ft (140.9 m^{2})
- Empty weight: 9,450 lb (4,286 kg)
- Gross weight: 15,600 lb (7,076 kg)
- Powerplant: 2 × Galloway Atlantic liquid cooled, 12-cylinder V engine, 500 hp (370 kW) each

== Notes ==
=== Bibliography ===
- The Illustrated Encyclopedia of Aircraft. London: Aerospace Publishing.
- Levy, Howard; Riding, Richard (March 1980). "Burnelli's Lifting Fuselages". Aeroplane Monthly. Vol. 8, no. 3. pp. 144–148. ISSN 0143-7240.
- Munson, Kenneth (1982). U.S. Commercial Aircraft. Jane's. p. 17. ISBN 9780710601209.
- Taylor, Michael J. H. (1993). Jane's Encyclopedia of Aviation. London: Studio Editions.
- World Aircraft Information Files. London: Bright Star Publishing.
- "The Remington–Burnelli Airliner". Aviation. April 5, 1926. p. 506.
- "The Remington-Burnelli "Airliner" Twin-engine Commercial Biplane". Flight. No. 28 June 1921. p. 581.
- "AeroFiles - Burnelli aircraft".
