= Vincent Burnelli =

American aeronautics engineer

Vincent Justus Burnelli
- Burnelli circa 1940-1950
- Born: November 22, 1895; Temple, Texas
- Died: June 22, 1964 (aged 68); Long Island, New York
- Resting place: Pinelawn Cemetery; Farmingdale, New York
- Education: St. Peter's College, New Jersey
- Occupation: Aircraft designer
- Known for: Lifting body, flying wing
- Spouse: Hazel Goodwin
- Children: Barbara Burnelli Adams, Patricia Burnelli Kimmins Steinhauser

Vincent Justus Burnelli (November 22, 1895 – June 22, 1964) was an American aeronautics engineer, instrumental in furthering the lifting body and flying wing concept.

== Biography ==
Burnelli was born on November 22, 1895, in Temple, Texas.

With his friend, John Carisi, he designed his first airplane in 1915, at Maspeth, Queens, New York. The open biplane was first demonstrated at the old Hempstead Plains Aviation Field, later to become Roosevelt Field. While the government wasn't interested in the Burnelli-Carisi biplane, it was purchased by the New York City Police Department, thus becoming the first aircraft that the department operated.

In 1919, Burnelli refined his ideas about aircraft design, after he had built what is believed to have been the world's first large commercial airliner, the Lawson L-4, in Milwaukee, Wisconsin, for the Lawson Airlines.

=== Flying wing/lifting body ===
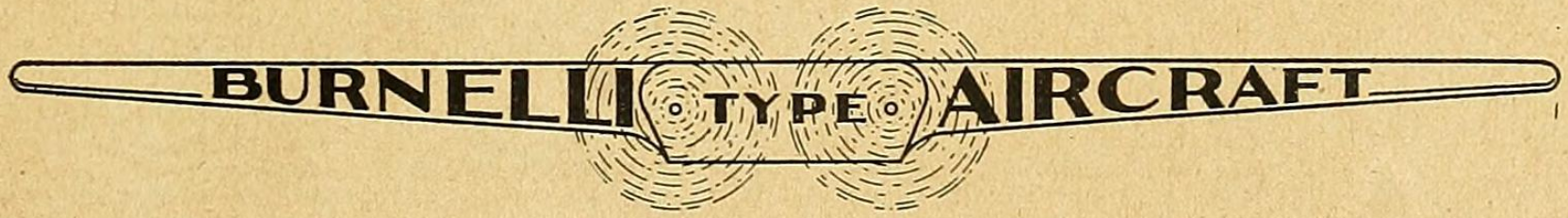
Logo of V. J. Burnelli Aircraft Construction

Although Burnelli referred to his lifting body transports as "flying wings", his production aircraft invariably retained some kind of a tail, frequently supported by upswept booms that extended rearward. More accurately, Burnelli had a "lifting fuselage" design, rather than a true "flying wing" where all major aeronautical components are housed within the wing.

Burnelli was one of the first American designers to capitalize on the "flying wing" mystique. He was dissatisfied with the Lawson L-4, stating that it was a "street car with wings" and that "street cars belong on the ground". In 1920 he, along with Charles Cox, bought the defunct Continental Aircraft Company factory in Amityville, Long Island. With backing from George C. T. Remington the Airliner Engineer Company was formed in 1921.

In the 1920s, he produced two biplane transports with large, airfoil-shaped fuselages that contributed a considerable portion of the airplane's lift. His goal was to develop a more efficient airplane that could carry a large payload. Their first aircraft, the Burnelli RB-1 biplane, was completed and flown at Curtiss Field, Long Island in July 1921. The next biplane, the Remington Burnelli RB-2, was completed in 1924.

In 1927 Vincent, with backing from Paul Champan (president of Skylines, Inc), designed and built the Burnelli CB-16 monoplane in 1928. In 1929 he teamed up with Inglis M. Uppercu to create the Uppercu-Burnelli Aircraft Corporation, which produced the Burnelli UB-20 in 1930. Also in 1929, Burnelli designed and built the Burnelli GX-3 which he entered into the Guggenheim Safe Aircraft Competition. 1934 saw the company change names once again, this time to the Burnelli Aircraft Company, which produced the Burnelli UB-14.

From 1938 to 1940 Burnelli worked with the Cuncliffe-Owen Aircraft Corporation in England to build the OA-1 Clyde Clipper. After returning to the United States he was hired as a consulting engineer with the Higgins Aircraft Corporation in New Orleans. The next, and last Burnelli designed aircraft was the Burnelli CBY-3 produced by Canadian Car and Foundry in 1944.

=== Later years ===
Moving to Southampton, New York, Burnelli remained tireless in his determination to promote his airfoil-shaped fuselage transport planes. In 1955, he adapted his final design, the Burnelli CBY-3 Loadmaster, to carry an expedition of 20 passengers and 41 sled dogs, along with their equipment, to the North Pole, but the enterprise was canceled. Until his death in 1964 at the age of 68, Vincent Burnelli championed his "flying wing" designs.

== Legacy ==
The Loadmaster continued to fly regularly as a commercial airliner both in northern Canada and South America. Acquired with design rights by Airlifts, Inc. of Miami, Florida, it went to Venezuela and returned to Burnelli Avionics for refitting with Wright R-2600 engines. The CBY-3 finally ended its flying days at Baltimore's airport in Maryland. In 1964, the quintessential Burnelli "flying wing" air transport was retired to the New England Air Museum in Windsor Locks, Connecticut, where it remains.

== Burnelli designs ==
- Continental KB-1 (1915)
- Burnelli (Lawson Airlines)
- Remington-Burnelli (airliner) SEE Burnelli, wide, airfoil-shaped fuselage w 2 Liberty 12 (400 hp) engines, 78' span;, 22.25' lg
- Burnelli RB-1 (1921)
- Burnelli RB-2 Air freighter (1924)
- Burnelli CB-16 Chapman Airliner (1928)
- Burnelli UB-20 (1929)
- Burnelli GX-3 (1929)
- Uppercu-Burnelli Aeromarine-Klemm Amphibian seaplane (1930)
- Burnelli UB-14 (1935)
  - Cunliffe-Owen Aircraft OA-1 Clyde Clipper (licence-built British version of the UB-14) (1939)
- Burnelli XCG-16 cargo glider (1943)
- Burnelli CBY-3 Loadmaster (1944) built in Canada by Canadian Car and Foundry
