= Avion =

Avion or Avión may refer to:

== Businesses ==
- Avion Corporation, the first of Jack Northrop's aviation firms
- Avion Express, a Lithuanian airline
- Avion Group, an Icelandic investment firm
- Avion Shopping Park, a shopping centre in the Ružinov borough of Bratislava, Slovakia
- Avión tequila, a brand of tequila produced in Jalisco, Mexico

== People ==
- Avion Black (born 1977), American former National Football League player
- Avion Blackman (born 1976), Trinidadian reggae singer

== Places ==
- Canton of Avion, Pas-de-Calais département, France
  - Avion, Pas-de-Calais, a commune in the canton
- Avión, a municipality in the province of Ourense in Spain
- Avion Ridge, Alberta, Canada

== Transportation ==
- Avion (car), an American prototype sports car
- Ader Avion II and Ader Avion III, steam-powered aircraft designed and built, respectively, by Clément Ader in the 1890s
- Avión Torpedo, an unbuilt rocket-powered aircraft
- Brock Avion, an American ultralight aircraft
- Blackjack Avion, a British three-wheeled kit car

== Other uses ==
- Avion (band), an Australian 1980s pop rock band
- CS Avion, a French football club based in Avion, Pas-de-Calais
- The Avion (newspaper), the student newspaper at Embry-Riddle Aeronautical University

== See also ==
- Les Avions, a French pop rock band from 1980 to 1997
