= Zanzottera MZ 301 =

Aircraft engine designed for ultralight aircraft

MZ 301
- Type: Two-stroke aircraft engine
- National origin: Italy
- Manufacturer: Zanzottera Technologies; Compact Radial Engines
- Manufactured: 2000-present

The Zanzottera MZ 301 is a three-cylinder, in-line two-stroke, dual ignition aircraft engine designed for ultralight aircraft.

The engine was originally designed and produced by Zanzottera Technologies of Italy, but the design was sold, along with the rest of the company's two-stroke ultralight aircraft engine line, to Compact Radial Engines of Surrey, British Columbia, Canada. Compact Radial Engines was then in turn acquired by Fiate Aviation Co., Ltd. of Hefei, Anhui, China in August 2017. Fiate Aviation did not advertise the engine as available in 2021.

== Development ==
The MZ 301 was developed first as a fuel injected 90 hp (67 kW) lightweight competitor to the more expensive liquid-cooled four stroke 80 hp (60 kW) Rotax 912. Later a carbureted version of the MZ 301 was developed with three Bing 54 carburetors and producing 85 hp (63 kW).

The MZ 301 has cylinder barrels that are Nikasil-coated. The bore and stroke are the same as the single cylinder MZ 34 engine and twin-cylinder MZ 201 and MZ 202 powerplants . The MZ 301 features electric starting and the RZ2 gearbox with optional reduction ratios of 2.18, 2.55, 2.88, 3.11 or 3.66 to 1.

== Variants ==
MZ 301 with three carburetors
Three-cylinder, fan-cooled, two stroke dual ignition 85 hp (63 kW) at 5,800 rpm aircraft engine. Equipped with three Bing 54 carburetors. Weight 53 kg (117 lb) with electric starter, 3 into 1 exhaust manifold and muffler.
MZ 301 with fuel injection
Three-cylinder, fan-cooled, two stroke dual ignition 90 hp (67 kW) at 6,250 rpm aircraft engine. Equipped with multipoint fuel injection. Weight 59 kg (130 lb) with electric starter, battery, fuel injection system, fuel pump, three mufflers and RZ2 gearbox.

== Applications ==
- Mosquito Aviation XE

== Specifications (MZ 301) ==
Data from Compact Radial Engines

=== General characteristics ===
- Type: Three-cylinder, two-stroke aircraft engine
- Bore: 76 mm (2.99 in)
- Stroke: 69 mm (2.72 in)
- Displacement: 940 cc (57.36 cu in)
- Dry weight: 53 kg (117 lb) with electric starter and muffler.

=== Components ===
- Valvetrain: Reed valve induction
- Fuel system: 3 X Bing 54 carburetters
- Fuel type: Premium auto fuel
- Oil system: 50:1 oil to fuel, premixed
- Cooling system: air cooled
- Reduction gear: RZ 2 gearbox with reduction ratios of 2.18, 2.55, 2.88, 3.11 or 3.66 to 1

=== Performance ===
- Power output: 85 hp (63 kW) at 5800 rpm

== See also ==
- Hirth 3701
