= Taggart GyroBee =

American gyroplane

GyroBee

General information
- Type: Autogyro
- National origin: United States
- Manufacturer: Star Bee Gyros
- Designer: Ralph E. Taggart
- Status: Free documentation available (2013); Kits in production (2013)

History
- Introduction date: 1990
- First flight: 1990
- Variant: Midwest Hornet

The Taggart GyroBee is an American autogyro that was designed by Ralph E. Taggart of Michigan State University and made available as free documentation. The aircraft is also produced in kit form by Star Bee Gyros of Worcester, Massachusetts for amateur construction.

== Design and development ==
The GyroBee was designed to comply with the US FAR 103 Ultralight Vehicles rules, including the category's maximum empty weight of 254 lb (115 kg). The aircraft has a standard empty weight of 247 lb (112 kg). It features a single main rotor, a single-seat open cockpit without a windshield, tricycle landing gear and a twin-cylinder, air-cooled, two-stroke, dual-ignition 45 hp (34 kW) Zanzottera MZ 201 engine in pusher configuration.

The aircraft fuselage is made from bolted-together 6061-T6 aluminum tubing. Its 23 ft (7.0 m) diameter Sport Copter rotor has a chord of 7 in (17.8 cm). With its empty weight of 247 lb (112 kg) and a gross weight of 550 lb (249 kg), it has a useful load of 303 lb (137 kg).

== Variants ==
Taggart Gyro Bee
Plans-built version introduced in 1990.
Star Bee Light
Kit-built version of the GyroBee, produced by Star Bee Gyros. Mounts a 23 ft (7.0 m) Sport Copter rotor, Ivoprop propeller and a 45 hp (34 kW) Zanzottera MZ 201.
Star Bee Total Bee
Kit-built version of the GyroBee, produced by Star Bee Gyros. Mounts a 23 ft (7.0 m) Dragon Wings rotor, Ivoprop propeller and a 60 hp (45 kW) Zanzottera MZ 202.
Midwest Hornet
Free plans-built version, based on the GyroBee.

== Specifications (Star Bee Light) ==
Data from Bayerl

General characteristics

- Crew: one
- Empty weight: 247 lb (112 kg)
- Gross weight: 551 lb (250 kg)
- Fuel capacity: 5 U.S. gallons (19 L; 4.2 imp gal)
- Powerplant: 1 × Zanzottera MZ 201 twin cylinder, air-cooled, two stroke aircraft engine, 45 hp (34 kW)
- Main rotor diameter: 24 ft 0 in (7.31 m)
- Propellers: 3-bladed Ivoprop

Performance

- Maximum speed: 68 mph (110 km/h, 59 kn)
- Cruise speed: 53 mph (85 km/h, 46 kn)
- Rate of climb: 590 ft/min (3 m/s)

== See also ==
Aircraft of comparable role, configuration, and era

- Bensen B-8
- Brock KB-2
- Midwest Hornet
- Wallis WA-116 Agile
