= Brock KB-3 =

American gyroplane

KB-3
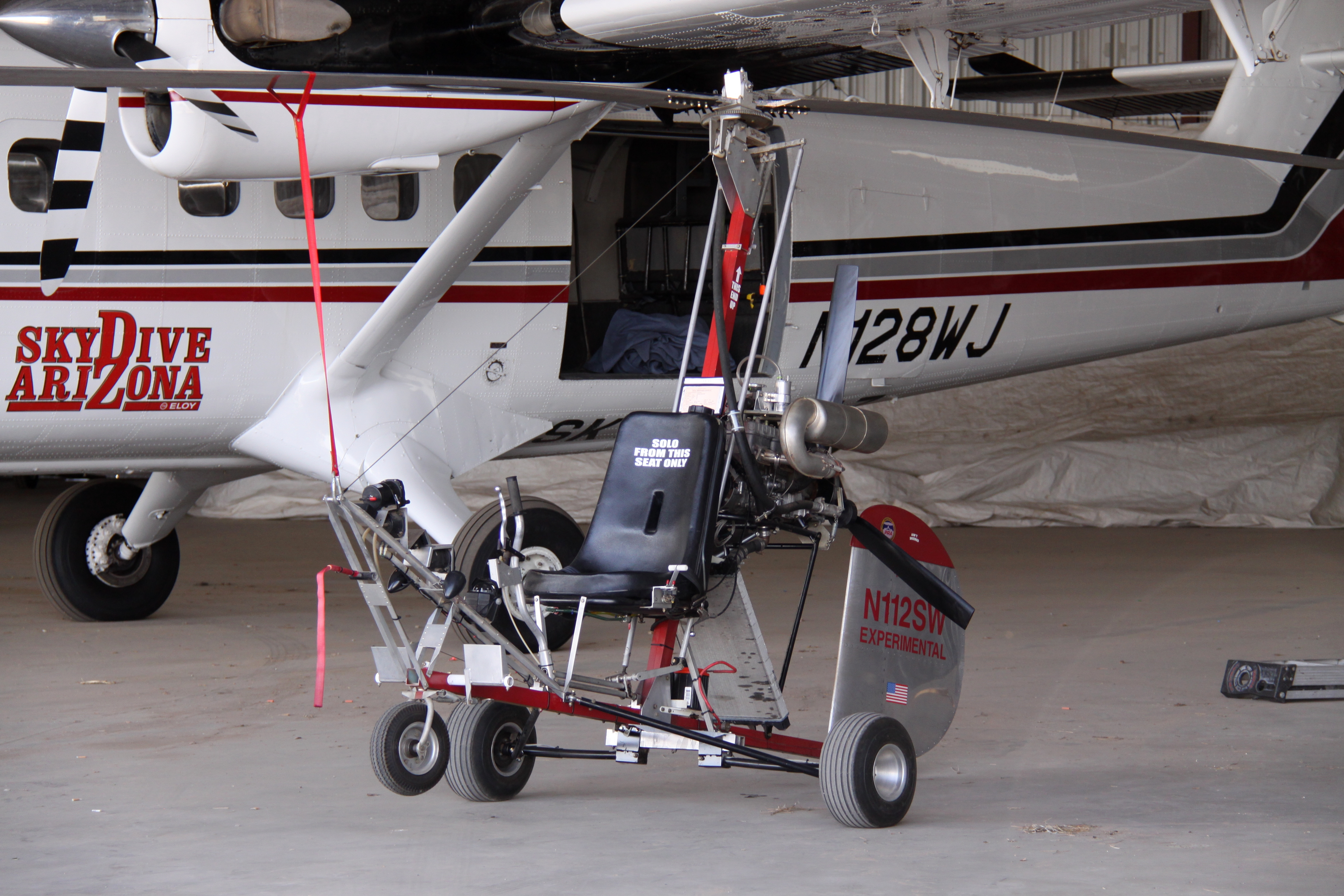

General information
- Type: Autogyro
- National origin: United States
- Manufacturer: Ken Brock Mfg
- Designer: Ken Brock
- Status: Production completed
- Number built: 200 (2005)

History
- Manufactured: 1985-2005
- Introduction date: 1985
- Developed from: Brock KB-2

The Brock KB-3 is an American autogyro that was designed by Ken Brock, produced by Ken Brock Mfg and introduced in 1985. The aircraft was supplied as a kit for amateur construction and was also available as plans.

== Design and development ==
The KB-3 was derived from the 1970 KB-2 and specifically designed to comply with the US FAR 103 Ultralight Vehicles rules, including the category's maximum empty weight of 254 lb (115 kg). The aircraft has a standard empty weight of 250 lb (113 kg). It features a single main rotor, a single-seat open cockpit without a windshield, tricycle landing gear and a twin cylinder, liquid-cooled, two-stroke, dual-ignition 64 hp (48 kW) Rotax 582 engine in pusher configuration.

The aircraft fuselage is made from bolted-together aluminum tubing. Its 22 ft (6.7 m) diameter rotor has two blades. Factory available options included a main rotor pre-rotator, a rotor brake and an instrument package. Fuel capacity is 5 U.S. gallons (19 L; 4.2 imp gal) and is housed in a combination pilot seat/fuel tank.

Due to its small size and light weight the KB-3 is easy to transport by trailer and can be set up to fly in ten minutes.

== Specifications (KB-3) ==
Data from Cliche and Kitplanes

General characteristics

- Crew: one
- Length: 12 ft 0 in (3.66 m)
- Empty weight: 250 lb (113 kg)
- Gross weight: 600 lb (272 kg)
- Fuel capacity: 5 U.S. gallons (19 L; 4.2 imp gal)
- Powerplant: 1 × Rotax 582 twin cylinder, liquid-cooled, two-stroke dual-ignition aircraft engine, 64 hp (48 kW)
- Main rotor diameter: × 22 ft 0 in (6.71 m)
- Main rotor area: 380 sq ft (35 m^{2})

Performance

- Maximum speed: 63 mph (101 km/h, 55 kn)
- Cruise speed: 60 mph (97 km/h, 52 kn)
- Range: 100 mi (160 km, 87 nmi)
- Service ceiling: 10,000 ft (3,000 m)
- Rate of climb: 1,200 ft/min (6.1 m/s)
- Disk loading: 1.58 lb/sq ft (7.7 kg/m^{2})
