= XLS =

XLS or xls may refer to:

- .xls, the filename extension for Excel Binary File Format, a spreadsheet file format used by older versions of Microsoft Excel
  - Blackboard Learn misuses this file extension when exporting what are actually tab-separated values files (which should have a .tsv or (less informatively) .txt extension), resulting in Microsoft Excel generating a warning message about the extension not matching the format
- Cadillac XLS, a prototype Cadillac concept car
- Exelis Inc. (NYSE symbol), a global aerospace, defense, information and services company
- Lusitanian language (ISO 639-3 code), an Indo-European Paleohispanic language
- Midwest Questar XLS, an American ultralight aircraft design
- Saint-Louis Airport (IATA airport code), near Saint-Louis, Senegal
