= The Butterfly LLC =

American aircraft manufacturer

- Genre: Gyroplane manufacturer
- Founder: Larry Neal
- Defunct: Early 2015
- Fate: Out of business
- Headquarters: Aurora, Texas
- Parent: Aerial Surveillance LLC

The Butterfly LLC was an American aircraft manufacturer specializing in homebuilt gyroplanes. Complete gyroplane kits were offered for the homebuilt market, as well as completed aircraft marketed for law enforcement surveillance. "The" was prefixed to the name of products.

The company seems to have gone out of business at the beginning of 2015.

== Aircraft ==
Aircraft built by The Butterfly
Model name	First flight	Number built	Type
The Butterfly The Ultralight Butterfly			Ultralight gyroplane
The Butterfly The Super Sky Cycle			Roadable gyroplane
The Butterfly The Aurora Butterfly			Gyroplane
The Butterfly The Golden Butterfly			Tandem gyroplane
The Butterfly The Turbo Golden Butterfly			Tandem gyroplane
The Butterfly The Emperor Butterfly			Gyroplane
The Butterfly The Monarch Butterfly			Gyroplane
