= Belite Aircraft =

American ultralight aircraft manufacturer

- Type: Privately held company
- Industry: Aerospace
- Founded: 2009
- Fate: Out of business due to fire
- Headquarters: Wichita, Kansas, United States
- Key people: James and Kathy Wiebe
- Products: Ultralight aircraft
- Owner: Belite Enterprises LLC
- Website: www.beliteaircraft.com

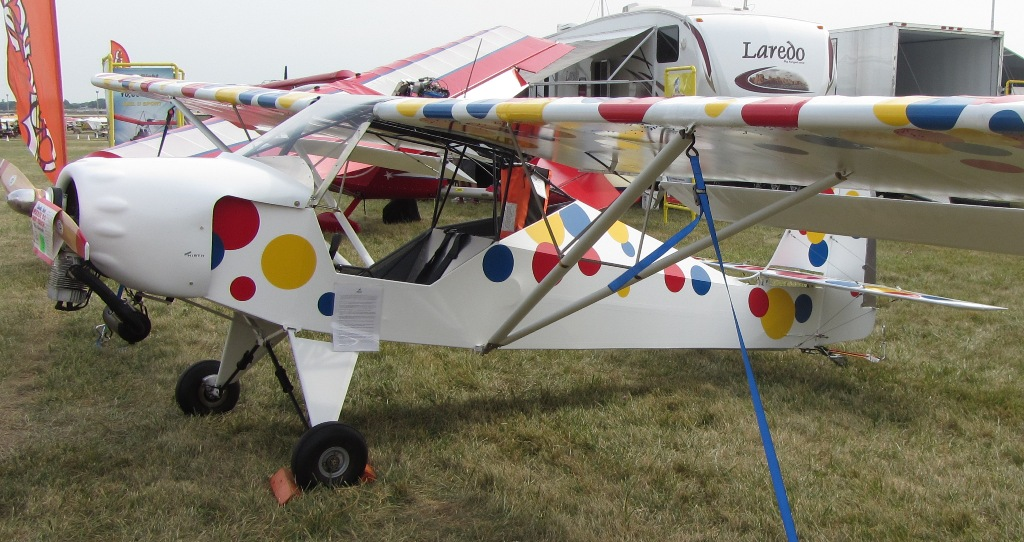
Belite Aircraft Superlite

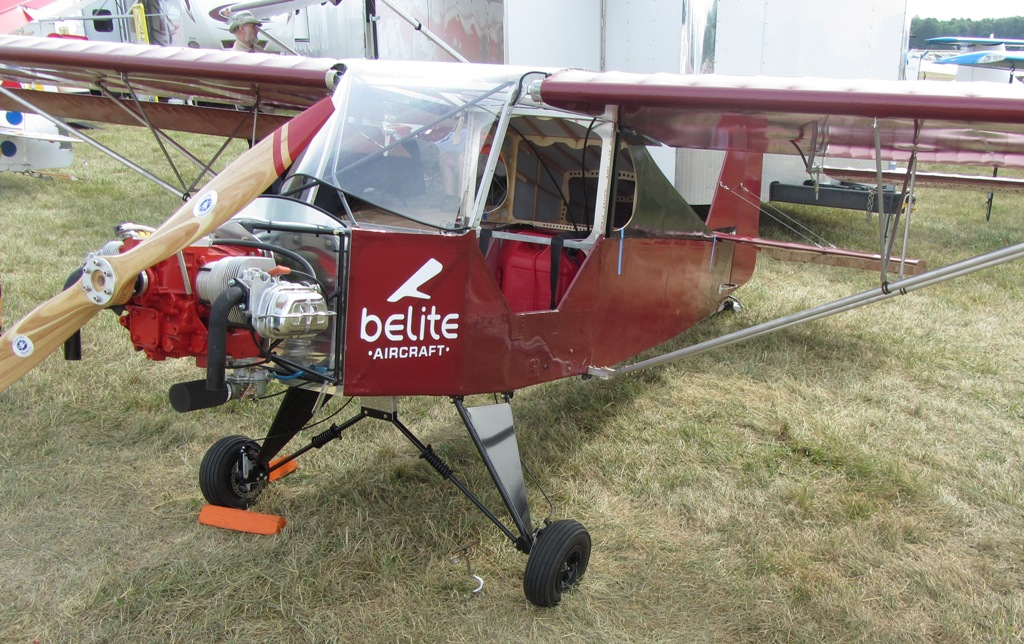
Belite Ultra Cub

Belite Aircraft was an American aircraft manufacturer based in Wichita, Kansas and founded by James and Kathy Wiebe in 2009. The company specialized in the design and manufacture of ultralight aircraft in the form of kits for amateur construction and ready-to-fly complete aircraft under the US FAR 103 Ultralight Vehicles rules.

The company was formed to produce the Belite Aircraft Superlite, a derivative of the Kitfox Lite single-seat ultralight design. Belite extensively redesigned the aircraft to incorporate carbon fibre wings, struts, spars and ribs, lowering the empty weight to 245 lb (111 kg). They "...acquired the production rights to a previously designed aircraft, the Kitfox Lite" and they "...acquired the tooling, existing parts and manufacturing rights to the aircraft in March 2009. As a condition of the transaction, they agreed to rebrand the airplane to prevent any confusion with the larger, two-place light sport Kitfox".

In January 2010, at the U.S. Sport Aviation Expo in Sebring, Florida, the company debuted two variants of the company's initial Belite 254: its "easy-to-land" tricycle-geared Trike, and its "higher performance" Superlite, a lighter-weight, higher-powered "STOL" (short takeoff and landing) version.

In 2013 the company flew the floatplane version of its new Belite Ultra Cub design, designated the Belite Sealite.

On 6 June 2019, the Belite facility was destroyed by fire and the company ceased operating.

== Aircraft ==
Summary of aircraft built by Belite Aircraft
Model name	First flight	Number built	Type
Belite Aircraft 254	2009		Single seat ultralight aircraft
Belite Aircraft Superlite	2009	10 (2011)	Single seat ultralight aircraft
Belite Aircraft Trike	2009		Single seat ultralight aircraft with tricycle gear
Belite Ultra Cub	2012		Single seat ultralight aircraft
Belite Sealite	2012		Single seat floatplane ultralight aircraft
Belite ProCub Lite			Single seat ultralight aircraft
Belite Chipper			Two seat experimental aircraft
