= Zanzottera MZ 201 =

Two-stroke aircraft engine

MZ 201 & MZ 202
- Type: Two-stroke aircraft engine
- National origin: Italy
- Manufacturer: Zanzottera Technologies; Compact Radial Engines; Fiate Aviation
- Major applications: Wings of Freedom Flitplane; ASAP Beaver Plus 2
- Manufactured: 2000–present

The Zanzottera MZ 201 and MZ 202 are a family of twin-cylinder, in-line two-stroke, dual ignition aircraft engines designed for ultralight aircraft and motor gliders.

The engine was originally designed and produced by Zanzottera Technologies of Italy, but the design was sold, along with the rest of the company's two-stroke ultralight aircraft engine line, to Compact Radial Engines of Surrey, British Columbia, Canada. Compact Radial Engines was then in turn acquired by Fiate Aviation Co., Ltd. of Hefei, Anhui, China in August 2017.

== Development ==
The MZ 202 was developed first as a 60 hp (45 kW) lightweight competitor to the liquid-cooled 64 hp (48 kW) Rotax 582. Later the MZ 201 was developed from the MZ 202 as a de-rated 45 hp (34 kW) version intended for motorgliders and single place ultralights that needed more power than the single-cylinder Zanzottera MZ 34.

The MZ 201 and 202 both have a cylinder barrels that are Nikasil-coated. The bore and stroke are the same as the single-cylinder MZ 34 engine. The MZ 201 features an optional recoil starter or electric starting, while the MZ 202 has electric starting only. The MZ 201 has a choice of a reduction drive belt or gearbox, while the MZ 202 offers just the gearbox with reduction ratios of 2.18, 2.55, 2.88, 3.11 or 3.66 to 1.

The owners manual acknowledges the limitations inherent in the design of the engine, stating:

This is not an aeronautic approved engine.

This engine has not been subjected to durability and safety tests in compliance with aeronautical standards and is not a certified engine. It is designed to be used in ULM or aeroplanes where engine failure will not produce serious consequences. The user must assume responsibility for all risks deriving from the use of this engine and must understand that this engine is subject to sudden failure. Engine failure may result in an emergency landing. Such accidents may cause serious material damage, injury and/or death.

Never use an aircraft fitted with this engine in areas, conditions and altitudes that may cause problems if forced to land as a result of sudden engine failure.

== Variants ==
MZ 201
Twin-cylinder, air-cooled, two-stroke dual ignition 45 hp (34 kW) aircraft engine optimized for motorgliders and single place ultralights. Equipped with a single Tillotson carburetor.
MZ 202
Twin-cylinder, air-cooled, two-stroke dual ignition 60 hp (45 kW) aircraft engine. Equipped with dual Bing carburetors.
MZ 202i
Twin-cylinder, air-cooled, two-stroke dual ignition 67 hp (50 kW) aircraft engine. Equipped with electronic fuel injection, controlled by a computerized engine management system. No longer in production

== Applications ==
MZ 201

- Belite Aircraft Superlite
- SlipStream Scepter
- SNAS Stryke-Air Bi
- Spacek SD-1 Minisport
- Star Bee Light
- Taggart GyroBee
- Wings of Freedom Flitplane

MZ 202

- ASAP Beaver Plus 2
- Apex Cross 5
- Innovator Mosquito Air
- Mosquito Aviation XE
- Sabre Wildcat
- Star Bee Total Bee

== Specifications (MZ 202) ==
Data from Instruction and Maintenance Manual MZ 202

=== General characteristics ===
- Type: Twin-cylinder, two-stroke aircraft engine
- Bore: 76 mm (2.99 in)
- Stroke: 69 mm (2.72 in)
- Displacement: 626 cc (38.20 cu in)
- Length: 313.5 mm (12.34 in)
- Width: 299.4 mm (11.79 in)
- Height: 331.1 mm (13.04 in)
- Dry weight: 38 kg (84 lb) with starter motor, two carburettors, fuel pump, cooling system and exhaust system.

=== Components ===
- Valvetrain: Reed valve induction
- Fuel type: Premium auto fuel
- Oil system: 50:1 oil to fuel, premixed
- Cooling system: air-cooled
- Reduction gear: RZ 2 gearbox with reduction ratios of 2.18, 2.55, 2.88, 3.11 or 3.66 to 1

=== Performance ===
- Power output: 63 hp (47 kW) at 6250 rpm
- Compression ratio: 9.1:1

== See also ==
- Hirth 2706
- Rotax 582
