= Wrobel Vroby 2 =

French powered parachute

Vroby 2

General information
- Type: Powered parachute
- National origin: France
- Manufacturer: Wrobel
- Designer: Gerard Wrobel
- Status: Production completed

The Wrobel Vroby 2 is a French powered parachute that was designed by Gerard Wrobel and produced by Wrobel of Beynes, Alpes-de-Haute-Provence. Now out of production, when it was available the aircraft was supplied as a complete ready-to-fly-aircraft.

== Design and development ==
The Vroby 2 was designed to comply with the Fédération Aéronautique Internationale microlight category, including the category's maximum gross weight of 450 kg (992 lb). The aircraft has a maximum gross weight of 250 kg (551 lb). It features a 38 m^{2} (410 sq ft) parachute-style wing, two-seats-in-tandem accommodation in an open-frame structure, tricycle landing gear and a single cylinder 26 hp (19 kW) Zanzottera MZ 34 engine in pusher configuration.

The aircraft carriage is built from 4130 steel tubing. In flight steering is accomplished via handles that actuate the canopy brakes, creating roll and yaw. On the ground the aircraft has lever-controlled nosewheel steering. The main landing gear incorporates triangulated spring rod suspension.

The aircraft has an empty weight of 58 kg (128 lb) and a gross weight of 250 kg (551 lb), giving a useful load of 192 kg (423 lb). With full fuel of 12 litres (2.6 imp gal; 3.2 US gal) the payload for crew and baggage is 183 kg (403 lb).

Reviewer Jean-Pierre le Camus, writing in 2003, described the design as "carefully constructed".

== Specifications (Vroby 2) ==
Data from Bertrand

General characteristics

- Crew: one
- Capacity: one passenger
- Wingspan: 15 m (49 ft 3 in)
- Wing area: 38 m^{2} (410 sq ft)
- Aspect ratio: 5.9:1
- Empty weight: 58 kg (128 lb)
- Gross weight: 250 kg (551 lb)
- Fuel capacity: 12 litres (2.6 imp gal; 3.2 US gal)
- Powerplant: 1 × Zanzottera MZ 34 single cylinder, two-stroke, air-cooled aircraft engine, 19 kW (26 hp)
- Propellers: 2-bladed wooden, fixed pitch

Performance

- Maximum speed: 60 km/h (37 mph, 32 kn)
- Cruise speed: 50 km/h (31 mph, 27 kn)
- Stall speed: 30 km/h (19 mph, 16 kn)
- Rate of climb: 1 m/s (200 ft/min)
- Wing loading: 6.6 kg/m^{2} (1.4 lb/sq ft)
