= Ken Brock Manufacturing =

American aircraft manufacturer

Ken Brock Manufacturing, Inc.
- Company type: Privately held company
- Industry: Aerospace
- Founded: 1960s
- Founder: Ken Brock
- Defunct: late 2005
- Fate: Out of business
- Headquarters: Stanton, California, United States
- Products: Kit aircraft, autogyros
- Subsidiaries: Santa Ana Metal Stamping

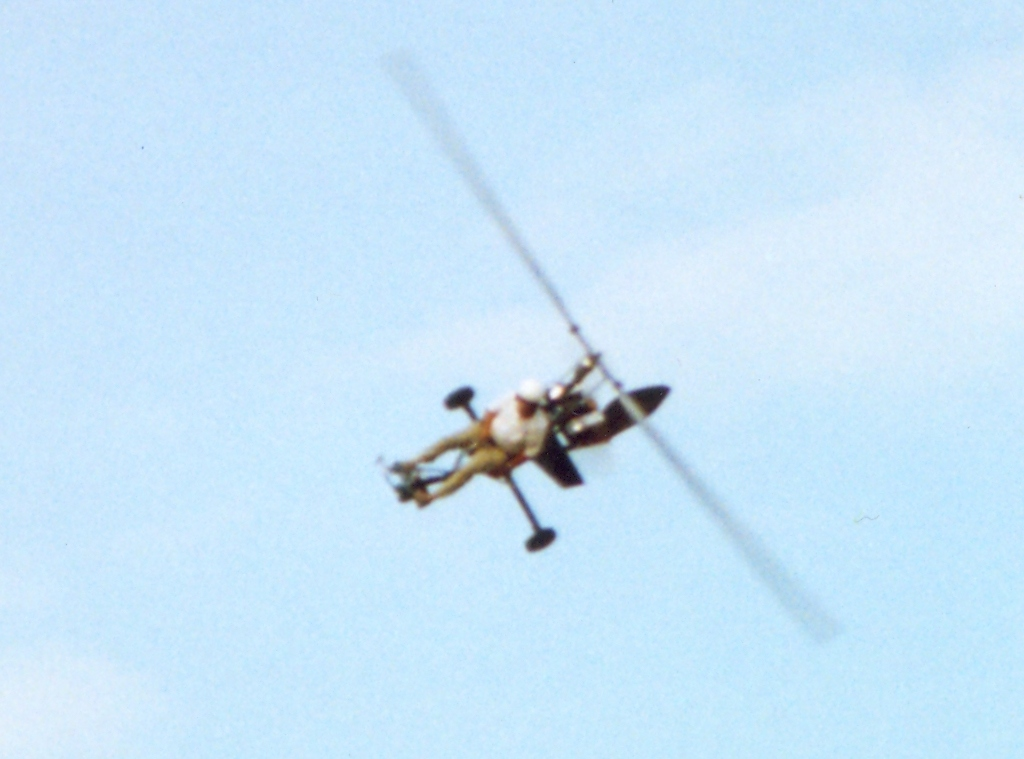
Ken Brock flying a Brock KB-2 in August 2001

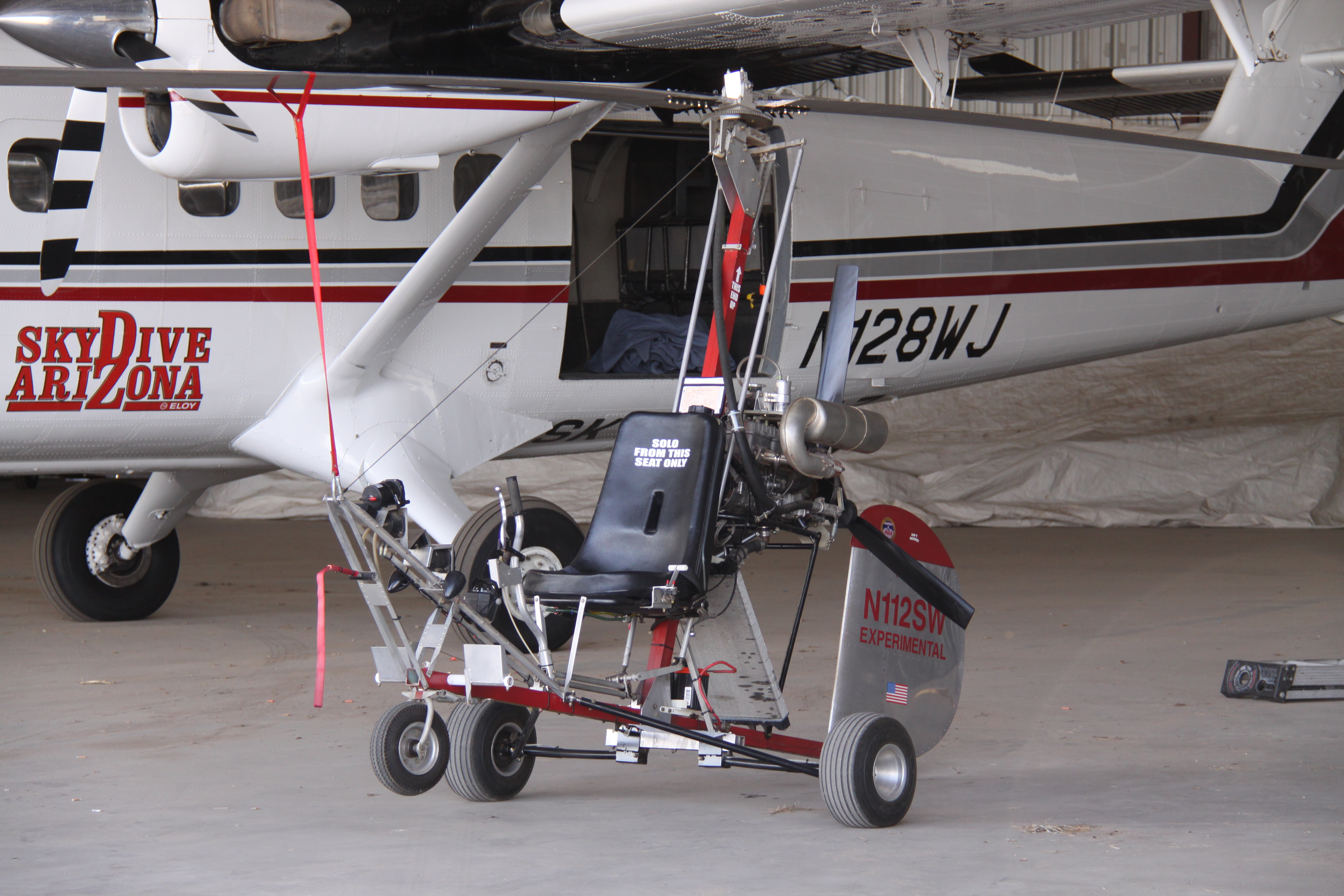
Brock KB-3

Ken Brock Manufacturing, Inc. was an American aircraft manufacturer founded by Ken Brock in the 1960s and based in Stanton, California. The company specialized in the design and manufacture of autogyros in the form of kits for amateur construction, including under the US FAR 103 Ultralight Vehicles rules.

Ken Brock Manufacturing produced a number of aircraft designs including the Brock KB-1, Brock KB-2 and Brock KB-3 autogyros, plus the Ken Hovey-engineered Brock Avion ultralight aircraft. The company was also noted for the high-quality aircraft parts that it produced for other designer's aircraft, especially the Rutan Long-EZ and the Cozy Mark IV.

The company occupied a 10,000 sq ft (930 m^{2}) plant that included lathes, milling machines, drill presses, tap and die making, equipment for heat treating metal, plating and welding.

A subsidiary was Santa Ana Metal Stamping, which Brock set up to produce stamped metal parts using numerical control machinery.

The company closed for business at the end of 2005 after Brock's death on 19 October 2001 while landing a Thorp T-18. After his death, Brock's widow, Marie Brock, who survived the 2001 accident, attempted to sell the business and parts on hand. Aircraft Spruce & Specialty Co purchased the Cozy Mark IV parts inventory, jigs, tooling and drawings.

== Aircraft ==
Summary of aircraft built by Ken Brock Manufacturing
Model name	First flight	Number built	Type
Brock KB-1			single seat autogyro
Brock KB-2	1970	more than 300 (2005)	single seat autogyro
Brock KB-3	1985	200 (2005)	single seat autogyro
Brock Avion			single seat ultralight aircraft
