= Midwest Hornet =

American autogyro

Hornet

General information
- Type: Autogyro
- National origin: United States
- Manufacturer: Midwest Engineering & Design
- Designer: Don Shoebridge
- Status: Plans available (2013)

History
- Introduction date: 1997
- Developed from: Taggart GyroBee

The Midwest Hornet is an American autogyro that was designed by Don Shoebridge and made available by Midwest Engineering & Design in the form of free plans for amateur construction.

== Design and development ==
The Hornet is a development of the Taggart GyroBee and was introduced in 1997. The Hornet was designed to comply with the US FAR 103 Ultralight Vehicles rules, including the category's maximum empty weight of 254 lb (115 kg). The aircraft has a standard empty weight of 254 lb (115 kg). It features a single main rotor, a single-seat, open cockpit without a windshield, tricycle landing gear and a twin cylinder, air-cooled, two-stroke, single-ignition 40 hp (30 kW) Rotax 447 engine in pusher configuration. The 50 hp (37 kW) Rotax 503 engine can also be fitted.

The aircraft fuselage is made from bolted-together aluminum tubing, while the landing gear and flight controls are fabricated from 4130 steel. The rotor has a diameter of 24 ft (7.3 m), while the propeller recommended is a Powerfin composite model with a diameter of 60 to 66 in (152 to 168 cm). With an empty weight of 254 lb (115 kg) and a gross weight of 534 lb (242 kg) the design offers a useful load of 280 lb (127 kg). Without a pre-rotator fitted the Hornet requires 600 to 800 ft (183 to 244 m) to become airborne.

== Specifications (Hornet) ==
Data from Bayerl and Midwest

General characteristics

- Crew: one
- Length: 11 ft 4.5 in (3.467 m) not including rotor
- Width: 6 ft 2 in (1.88 m)
- Height: 7 ft 6 in (2.29 m)
- Empty weight: 254 lb (115 kg)
- Gross weight: 534 lb (242 kg)
- Fuel capacity: 5 U.S. gallons (19 L; 4.2 imp gal)
- Powerplant: 1 × Rotax 447 twin cylinder, air-cooled, two-stroke, single-ignition aircraft engine, 40 hp (30 kW)
- Main rotor diameter: 24 ft (7.3 m)
- Propellers: 3-bladed Powerfin, 5 ft 6 in (1.68 m) diameter

Performance

- Maximum speed: 63 mph (101 km/h, 55 kn)
- Cruise speed: 50 mph (80 km/h, 43 kn)
- Range: 55 mi (89 km, 48 nmi)
- Rate of climb: 750 ft/min (3.8 m/s)

== See also ==
Aircraft of comparable role, configuration, and era

- Bensen B-8
- Brock KB-2
- Taggart GyroBee
- Wallis WA-116 Agile

Related lists

- List of experimental aircraft
