= Belite Aircraft Superlite =

Superlite
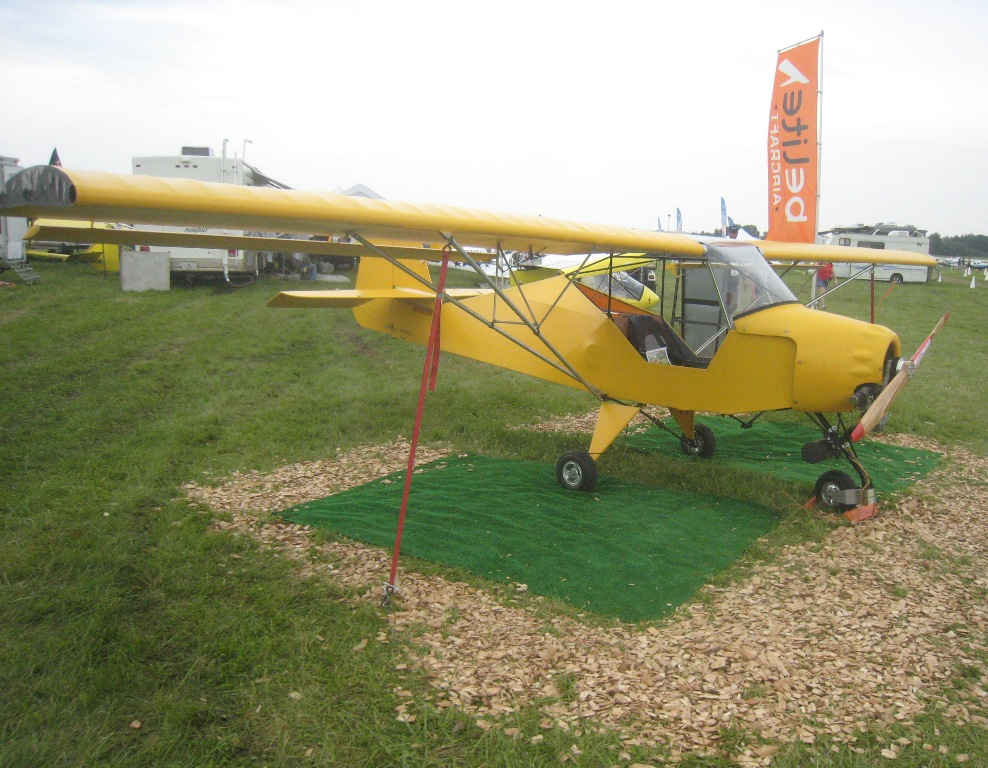
- A Belite Trike

General information
- Type: Ultralight aircraft
- National origin: United States of America
- Manufacturer: Belite Aircraft
- Designer: James Wiebe
- Number built: 10 (2011)

History
- Developed from: Kitfox Lite

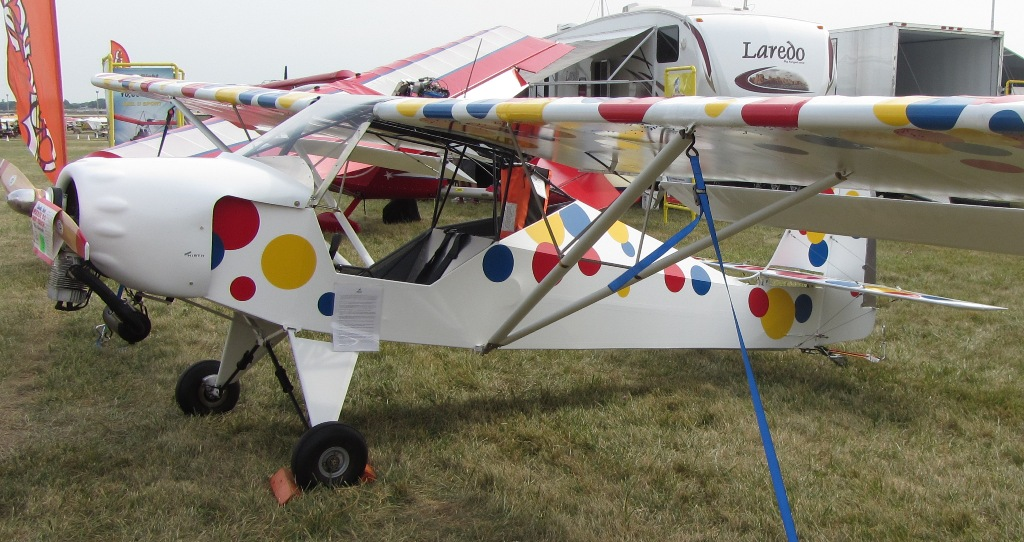
Belite Superlite

The Belite Superlite, originally the product of Belite Aircraft, is a single-seat, high-wing, single-engine ultralight aircraft developed from the Kitfox Lite aircraft especially for the United States FAR 103 Ultralight Vehicles category.

== Design and development ==
Designer James Wiebe bought the assets and tooling of the Kitfox Lite from Skystar. He modified the prototype Kitfox Lite to meet FAR 103 regulations requiring an ultralight aircraft to have an empty weight of less than 254 lb (115 kg).

The fuselage is made from 4130 steel tubing. Flaperons and vortex generators are used to improve roll control and low speed flight. The wings are foldable for storage.

Items were substituted with carbon-fiber-reinforced polymer to make the aircraft lighter than a Kitfox Lite. This included the tailwheel leaf spring, wing spars, wing ribs (aluminum on later kits), lift struts, firewall, elevator and fuel tank. A variety of engines may be used such as the Hirth F33, Hirth F-23, Zanzottera MZ 34, 1/2 Volkswagen air-cooled engine and the Zanzottera MZ 201.

== Variants ==
254
The basic ultralight fuselage design, for powerplants of 28 to 45 hp (21 to 34 kW).
Superlite
Maximum weight reduction fuselage for larger engines of 50 hp (37 kW), with an empty weight of 278 lb (126 kg) when equipped with the Hirth F-23 engine of 50 hp (37 kW).
Trike
A tricycle gear version of the Superlite, with an empty weight of 254 lb (115 kg) when equipped with the Hirth F-33 engine of 30 hp (22 kW).

== Specifications (Superlite) ==
Data from Sport Aviation

General characteristics

- Capacity: 1
- Wingspan: 25 ft 2 in (7.67 m)
- Empty weight: 254 lb (115 kg)
- Gross weight: 550 lb (249 kg)
- Fuel capacity: 5 US gallons (19 L; 4.2 imp gal)
- Ballistic parachute: Second Chantz system
- Powerplant: 1 × Compact Radial MZ-201 two stroke, 45 hp (34 kW)
- Propellers: 2-bladed

Performance

- Cruise speed: 48 kn (55 mph, 89 km/h)
- Stall speed: 24 kn (28 mph, 45 km/h)
- Rate of climb: 400 ft/min (2.0 m/s)
- Wing loading: 5.56 lb/sq ft (27.1 kg/m^{2})

Avionics

- Belite Electronics lightweight electronic gauges

== Popular culture ==
A Belite aircraft was used in the show Mythbusters Episode 174 – Duct Tape Plane. A Belite was "mauled" by an artificial bear claw with the damage being limited to the fabric skin of the rear fuselage and vertical stabilizer. The control surfaces were not damaged during the destruction. The aircraft was then repaired with Duct-Tape and successfully flown.

Note: This is not to be confused with Speed tape.
