= Acheville =

- Commune
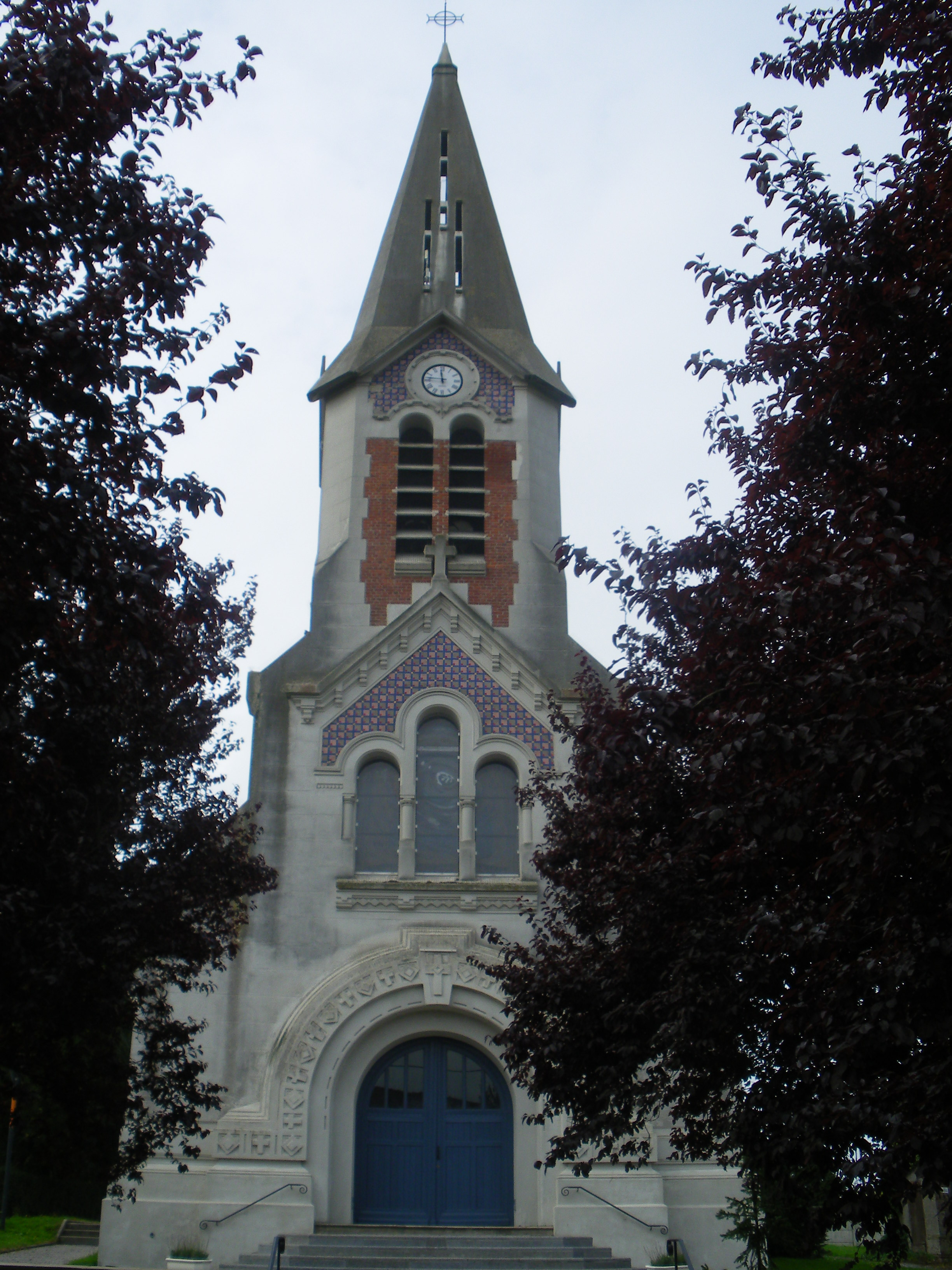
- The church of Acheville

- Coat of arms
- Location of Acheville
- Location within France Location within Hauts-de-France
- Coordinates: 50°23′02″N 2°53′01″E
- Country: France
- Region: Hauts-de-France
- Department: Pas-de-Calais
- Arrondissement: Lens
- Canton: Avion
- Intercommunality: Lens-Liévin

Government
  - Mayor (2020–2026): Philippe La Grange
- Area^{1}: 3.04 km^{2} (1.17 sq mi)
- Elevation: 59 m (194 ft)
- Highest elevation: 71 m (233 ft)
- Lowest elevation: 51 m (167 ft)
- Population (2023): 576
  - Density: 189/km^{2} (491/sq mi)
- Time zone: UTC+01:00 (CET)
  - Summer (DST): UTC+02:00 (CEST)
- INSEE/Postal code: 62003 /62320
- ^{1} French Land Register data, which excludes lakes, ponds, glaciers > 1 km^{2} (0.386 sq mi or 247 acres) and river estuaries.

Acheville (French pronunciation: [aʃvil]) is a commune in the Pas-de-Calais department in northern France.

== Geography ==
Acheville is situated some 4 miles (7 km) southeast of Lens, on the D33.

== Population ==
Historical population
Year	Pop.	±% p.a.
1968	290	—
1975	313	+1.10%
1982	399	+3.53%
1990	438	+1.17%
1999	457	+0.47%
2007	594	+3.33%
2012	628	+1.12%
2017	627	−0.03%
2023	576	−1.40%
Source: INSEE

== See also ==
Communes of the Pas-de-Calais department
