= The Butterfly Golden =

Trainer autogyro aircraft

The Golden Butterfly is a training two-seat autogyro produced by The Butterfly LLC as a complete kit for homebuilding. It won a rotorcraft award for "Outstanding New Design" at the Experimental Aircraft Association's AirVenture in 2004. The instructor has a seat behind and elevated relative to the pupil. To give the aircraft improved safety, the horizontal stabilizer is large and the line of thrust of the propeller is below the centre-of-gravity.
