= Mosquito Aviation XE =

American homebuilt helicopter

XE
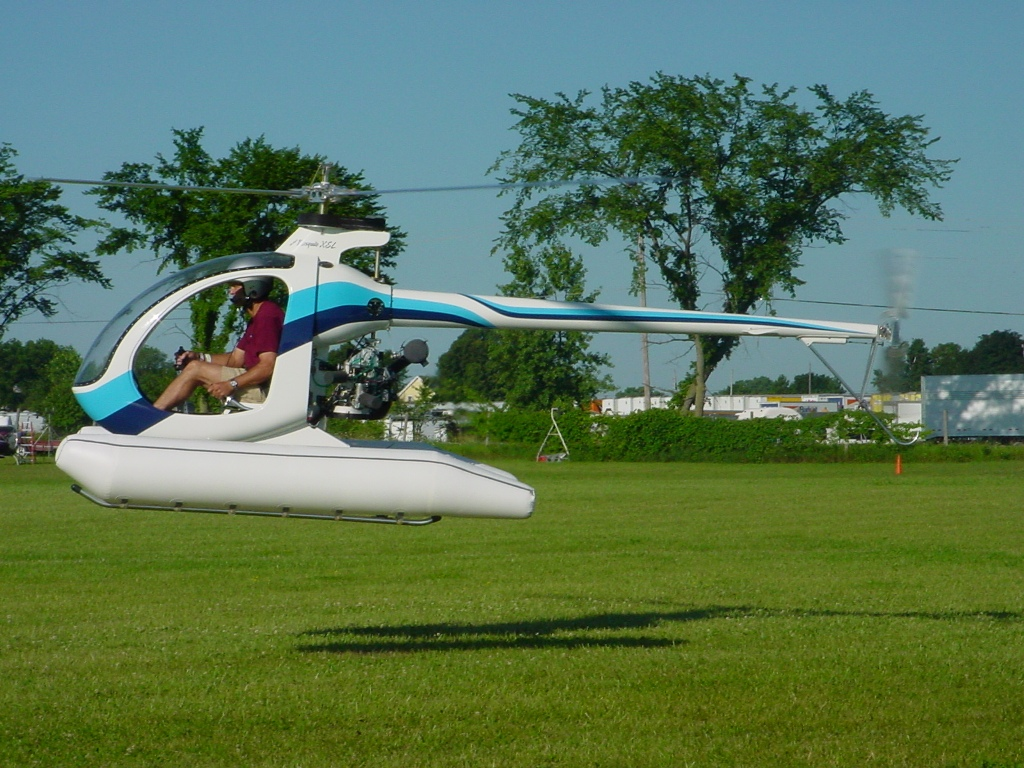
- XEL variant with floats

General information
- Type: Kit helicopter
- National origin: Canada
- Manufacturer: Mosquito Aviation; Innovator Technologies; Composite FX
- Designer: John Uptigrove
- Number built: 37+

History
- Introduction date: 2004
- Developed from: Mosquito Air

The Mosquito Aviation XE is a single seat homebuilt helicopter.

By 2015 Mosquito Aviation was out of business and the design was being produced by Innovator Technologies of Rockyview, Alberta, Canada. By 2019 the design was being produced by Composite FX of Trenton, Florida.

== Design and development ==
The XE is a development of the Mosquito Air, with a cockpit fairing and a more sophisticated exhaust system, plus a rotor diameter increased by 40 cm (15.7 in) to support the higher gross weight. The aircraft was designed to comply with the US Experimental – Amateur-built and European microlight aircraft rules. It features a single main rotor and tail rotor, a single-seat enclosed cockpit with a windshield, skid landing gear and a two-cylinder, air-cooled, two stroke 64 hp (48 kW) MZ 202 engine.

The aircraft fuselage is made from composites and metal tubing. Its two-bladed rotor has a diameter of 5.95 m (19.5 ft) and a chord of 17 cm (6.7 in). The aircraft has a typical empty weight of 135 kg (298 lb) and a gross weight of 280 kg (617 lb), giving a useful load of 145 kg (320 lb). With full fuel of 45 litres (9.9 imp gal; 12 US gal) the payload for the pilot and baggage is 112 kg (247 lb).

== Variants ==
AIR
(2002) Open aluminum frame with tripod landing gear
XE
(2004)
XEL
XE with floats. Meets United States FAA FAR 103 Ultralight Vehicles rules for 254 lb (115 kg) and under for ultralight aircraft.
XE285 – Discontinued
85 hp (63 kW) Inntec 800 2 cylinder 2 cycle
XE3 – Discontinued
85 hp (63 kW) CRE MZ 301 3 cylinder 2 cycle
XE 290
90 hp (67 kW) CFX 800 2-stroke, fuel injected, water cooled
XET
90 hp (67 kW) Solar T62-2A1 turbine

== Specifications (XE) ==
Data from manufacturer

General characteristics

- Crew: 1
- Length: 4.9 m (16 ft)
- Empty weight: 135 kg (298 lb)
- Gross weight: 277 kg (610 lb)
- Fuel capacity: 12 U.S. gallons (45 L; 10.0 imp gal)
- Powerplant: 1 × Compact Radial Engines MZ 202 2 cylinder, 2 stroke, 48 kW (64 hp)

Performance

- Maximum speed: 130 km/h (80 mph, 70 kn)

== See also ==
- Dynali H2S
- Heli-Sport CH-7

Related lists

- List of single seat helicopters
