= Midwest Zodiac Talon-Turbine =

American helicopter

Zodiac Talon-Turbine

General information
- Type: Helicopter
- National origin: United States
- Manufacturer: Midwest Engineering & Design
- Status: Plans no longer available (2015)
- Number built: at least 15

The Midwest Zodiac Talon-Turbine is an American helicopter that was designed and produced by Midwest Engineering & Design of Overland Park, Kansas. When it was available the aircraft was supplied in the form of plans for amateur construction, but the plans are no longer advertised for sale.

== Design and development ==
The Zodiac Talon-Turbine was designed to comply with the US Experimental - Amateur-built aircraft rules. It features a single 25 ft (7.6 m) diameter two-bladed main rotor, a two-bladed tail rotor, a two-seats-in side-by-side configuration enclosed cockpit with a bubble canopy, and skid-type landing gear. The acceptable power range is 95 to 225 hp (71 to 168 kW) and the standard engine used is a Sunstrand 190 hp (142 kW) turboshaft powerplant.

Rotor dynamic components can be sourced from commercially produced products for other helicopter models, including the Hughes 300, Robinson R22 and Rotorway Exec.

The aircraft fuselage is made from a combination of steel, aluminum and composite material. The aircraft has an empty weight of 600 lb (272 kg) and a gross weight of 1,425 lb (646 kg), giving a useful load of 825 lb (374 kg). With full fuel of 48 U.S. gallons (180 L; 40 imp gal) the payload for crew and baggage is 500 lb (227 kg). The cabin width is 42 in (107 cm).

The manufacturer estimated the construction time from the plans as 1100 hours.

== Operational history ==
By 1998 the company reported that 400 sets of plans had been sold and 15 aircraft were completed and flying. The prototype was reported to have 1200 hours on it flying overseas in the agricultural aircraft role.

By March 2015 no examples had been registered in the United States with the Federal Aviation Administration.

== Specifications (Zodiac Talon-Turbine) ==
Data from Purdy

General characteristics

- Crew: one
- Capacity: one passenger
- Length: 31 ft 0 in (9.45 m)
- Empty weight: 600 lb (272 kg)
- Gross weight: 1,425 lb (646 kg)
- Fuel capacity: 48 U.S. gallons (180 L; 40 imp gal)
- Powerplant: 1 × Sunstrand turbine aircraft engine, 190 hp (140 kW)
- Main rotor diameter: 25 ft 0 in (7.62 m)
- Main rotor area: 490 sq ft (46 m^{2})

Performance

- Maximum speed: 130 mph (210 km/h, 110 kn)
- Cruise speed: 95 mph (153 km/h, 83 kn)
- Range: 240 mi (390 km, 210 nmi)
- Service ceiling: 15,000 ft (4,600 m)
- Rate of climb: 1,100 ft/min (5.6 m/s)
- Disk loading: 2.9 lb/sq ft (14 kg/m^{2})

== See also ==
- List of rotorcraft
