= Midwest Questar Sport =

American ultralight aircraft

Questar Sport

General information
- Type: Ultralight aircraft
- National origin: United States
- Manufacturer: Midwest Engineering
- Number built: 30 (1998)

History
- Retired: Plans no longer available as of 29 June 2000

The Midwest Questar Sport is an American ultralight aircraft that was designed and produced by Midwest Engineering of Overland Park, Kansas. When it was available the aircraft was supplied in the form of plans for amateur construction, but the plans were withdrawn on 29 June 2000.

== Design and development ==
The Questar Sport was designed to comply with the US FAR 103 Ultralight Vehicles rules, including the category's maximum empty weight of 254 lb (115 kg). The aircraft has a standard empty weight of 160 lb (73 kg).

The aircraft features a strut-braced high-wing, a single-seat open cockpit without a windshield, fixed conventional landing gear without wheel pants and a single engine in tractor configuration.

The Questar Sport is made from bolted-together 6061-T6 aluminum tubing, with its flying surfaces covered in doped aircraft fabric. Its 33.25 ft (10.1 m) span wing has a wing area of 165.0 sq ft (15.33 m^{2}), is supported by "V" struts and can be folded in ten minutes for ground transport or storage. The acceptable power range is 30 to 40 hp (22 to 30 kW) and the standard engines used are small 30 hp (22 kW) two-stroke powerplants.

The aircraft has a typical empty weight of 160 lb (73 kg) and a gross weight of 400 lb (180 kg), giving a useful load of 240 lb (110 kg). With full fuel of 3 U.S. gallons (11 L; 2.5 imp gal) the payload for the pilot and baggage is 222 lb (101 kg).

The standard day, sea level, no wind, take off distance with a 30 hp (22 kW) engine is 120 ft (37 m) and the landing roll is 80 ft (24 m).

The manufacturer estimated the construction time from the supplied plans as 80 hours.

== Operational history ==
By 1998 the company reported that 120 sets of plans had been sold and that 30 aircraft were completed and flying.

== Specifications (Questar Sport) ==
Data from AeroCrafter

General characteristics

- Crew: one
- Length: 17.50 ft (5.33 m)
- Wingspan: 33.25 ft (10.13 m)
- Wing area: 165.0 sq ft (15.33 m^{2})
- Empty weight: 160 lb (73 kg)
- Gross weight: 400 lb (181 kg)
- Fuel capacity: 3 U.S. gallons (11 L; 2.5 imp gal)
- Powerplant: 1 × two-stroke aircraft engine, 30 hp (22 kW)
- Propellers: 2-bladed wooden

Performance

- Maximum speed: 48 mph (77 km/h, 42 kn)
- Cruise speed: 38 mph (61 km/h, 33 kn)
- Stall speed: 20 mph (32 km/h, 17 kn)
- Range: 60 mi (97 km, 52 nmi)
- Service ceiling: 10,000 ft (3,000 m)
- Rate of climb: 350 ft/min (1.8 m/s)
- Wing loading: 2.4 lb/sq ft (12 kg/m^{2})
