= The Butterfly Monarch =

American autogyro

Monarch

General information
- Type: Autogyro
- National origin: United States
- Manufacturer: The Butterfly LLC
- Status: In production (2012)

The Butterfly Monarch is an American autogyro, designed and produced by The Butterfly LLC of Aurora, Texas. The aircraft is supplied as a kit for amateur construction.

== Design and development ==
The Monarch was designed to comply with the US Experimental - Amateur-built rules. It features a single main rotor, a single-seat open cockpit without a windshield, tricycle landing gear with wheel pants and a twin cylinder, liquid-cooled, two-stroke, dual-ignition 64 hp (48 kW) Rotax 582 engine in pusher configuration.

The Monarch's fuselage is made from metal tubing and mounts a two-bladed main rotor with a diameter of 8 m (26.2 ft), with an electric pre-rotator to shorten take-off distances. The aircraft has an empty weight of 360 lb (160 kg) and a gross weight of 630 lb (290 kg), giving a useful load of 270 lb (120 kg). The tail surfaces are made from Kevlar. The landing gear is of 4130 steel construction, incorporates springs and has a long stroke of 18 in (46 cm) to allow almost vertical landings, including descent rates of 500 ft/min (2.5 m/s) at touchdown. The tricycle landing gear is supplemented by a triple tail caster.

Optional equipment available includes a cockpit fairing with a windshield, rotor brake, auxiliary 6 U.S. gallons (23 L; 5.0 imp gal) fuel tank and an airshow smoke system.

== Operational history ==
By December 2012 eight examples had been registered in the United States with the Federal Aviation Administration.

== Specifications (Monarch) ==
Data from Bayerl and The Butterfly

General characteristics

- Crew: one
- Capacity: one passenger
- Length: 11 ft 2 in (3.40 m)
- Width: 6 ft 0 in (1.83 m)
- Height: 7 ft 5 in (2.26 m)
- Empty weight: 359 lb (163 kg)
- Gross weight: 628 lb (285 kg)
- Fuel capacity: 7.5 U.S. gallons (28 L; 6.2 imp gal)
- Powerplant: 1 × Rotax 582 twin cylinder, liquid-cooled, two stroke aircraft engine, 64 hp (48 kW)
- Main rotor diameter: 26 ft 3 in (8 m)
- Propellers: 2-bladed Tennessee Propellers wooden

Performance

- Maximum speed: 70 mph (112 km/h, 60 kn)
- Cruise speed: 62 mph (100 km/h, 54 kn)
