= Midwest Engineering & Design =

American manufacturer

- Company type: Privately held company
- Industry: Aerospace
- Headquarters: Overland Park, Kansas, United States
- Products: Aircraft plans, boat and submarine plans, kits and parts
- Owner: Digital Marketing USA
- Website: www.digitalmarketingusa.com

Midwest Engineering & Design (also called just Midwest Engineering) is an American aircraft, boat and submarine manufacturer based in Overland Park, Kansas. The company specializes in the design and manufacture of a wide variety of vehicles and other products under the motto "Exploring our world by land, sea and air".

The company is a division of Digital Marketing USA.

The company's products include autogyros, sailboats, submarines, Scuba diver propulsion vehicle, hydrofoils, off-road motorcycles, amphibious gliders, underwater camera housings, hydrophones, powered paragliders, a line of outdoor cookbooks and a discontinued line of ultralight aircraft and helicopters. Some products are available as plans, kits, parts or complete units.

== Aircraft ==
Summary of aircraft built by Midwest Engineering
Model name	First flight	Number built	Type
Midwest Hornet	1997		Autogyro
Midwest Questar Arrowstar		60 (1998)	Ultralight aircraft
Midwest Questar Open Aire		10 (1998)	Ultralight aircraft
Midwest Questar Sport		30 (1998)	Ultralight aircraft
Midwest Questar XLS		10 (1998)	Ultralight aircraft
Midwest Zodiac Talon-Turbine	1990s	15 (1998)	helicopter
