= Butterfly Super Sky Cycle =

Type of aircraft

Super Sky Cycle
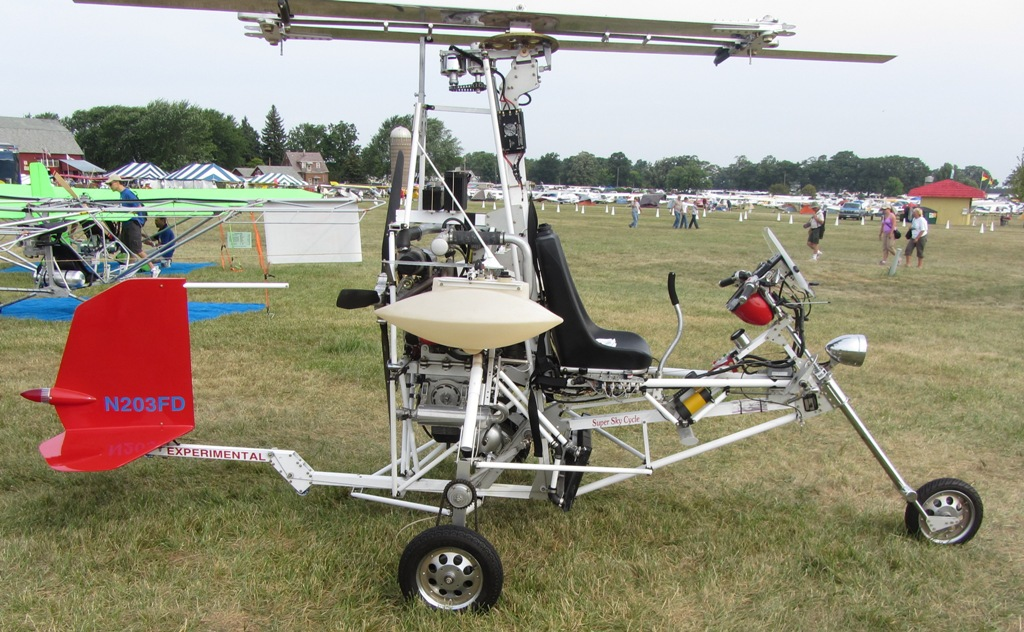

General information
- Type: Gyroplane
- National origin: United States
- Manufacturer: The Butterfly Aircraft LLC
- Designer: Larry Neal

History
- Introduction date: 2009

The Butterfly Super Sky Cycle is an American homebuilt roadable gyroplane designed and manufactured by The Butterfly Aircraft LLC.

== Design ==
The Super Sky Cycle is a pusher gyroplane with tricycle undercarriage and belt drive propulsion. A second two cycle engine drives the main wheels. A Kevlar tail provides directional control in flight. The rotors are able to be folded for road travel. Two 5 U.S. gallons (19 L; 4.2 imp gal) tanks are mounted in reserve.

== Specifications ==
Data from Manufacter

General characteristics

- Length: 14 ft 8 in (4.47 m)
- Height: 8 ft 3 in (2.51 m) Can be reduced to 7 ft 10 in (2.39 m) for storage
- Empty weight: 750 lb (340 kg)
- Fuel capacity: 7.5 U.S. gallons (28 L; 6.2 imp gal)
- Powerplant: 1 × Rotax 914 Turbocharged 4 cylinder piston aircraft engine, 115 hp (86 kW)
- Powerplant: 1 × Zanzottera MZ 34 two stroke aircraft engine, 27 hp (20 kW) (ground propulsion only)
- Propellers: 2-bladed

Performance

- Cruise speed: 70 kn (80 mph, 130 km/h)
