= Innovator Mosquito Air =

Canadian homebuilt helicopter

Mosquito Air
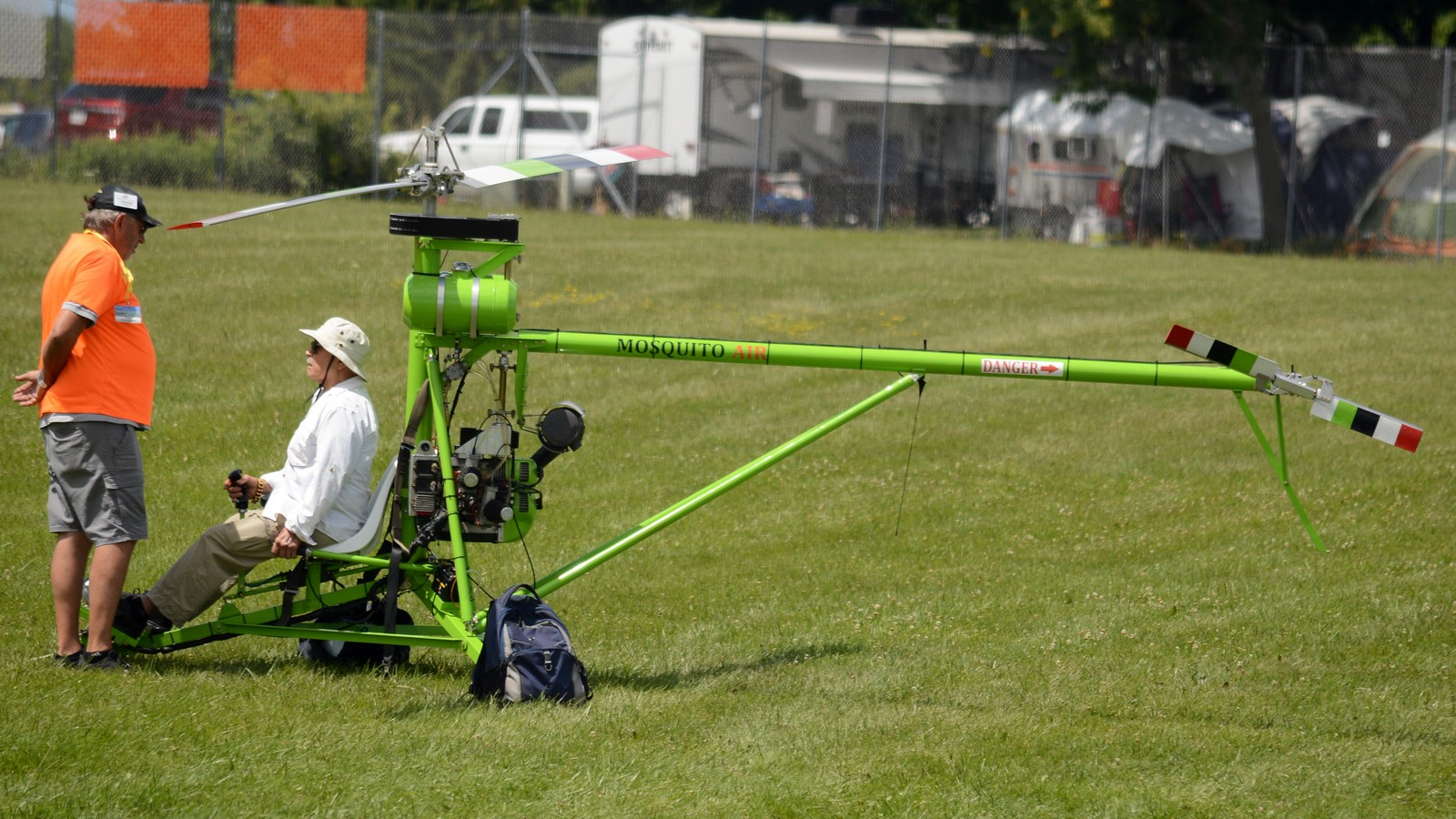

General information
- Type: Helicopter
- National origin: Canada
- Manufacturer: Innovator Technologies
- Status: In production (2017)

History
- Variant: Mosquito XE

The Innovator Mosquito Air is a Canadian helicopter produced by Innovator Technologies of Rockyview, Alberta. The aircraft is supplied as a kit for amateur construction.

== Design and development ==
The Mosquito Air was designed to comply with the United States FAR 103 Ultralight Vehicles, including the category's maximum empty weight of 254 lb (115 kg). The aircraft has a standard empty weight of 254 lb (115 kg). It features a single main rotor and tail rotor, a single-seat open cockpit without a windshield, skid landing gear and a two-cylinder, air-cooled, two-stroke 64 hp (48 kW) Zanzottera MZ 202 engine.

The aircraft fuselage is made from bolted-together 6061-T6 aluminium tubing, with a carbon fibre tail boom and support struts. Its two-bladed rotor has a diameter of 5.5 m (18.0 ft) and a chord of 17 cm (6.7 in). The cyclic control is routed via the centre of the rotor mast and the main rotor transmission is a poly "V" belt. The aircraft has a typical empty weight of 115 kg (254 lb) and a gross weight of 240 kg (529 lb), giving a useful load of 125 kg (276 lb). With full fuel of 19 litres (4.2 imp gal; 5.0 US gal) the payload for the pilot and baggage is 111 kg (245 lb).

Reviewer Werner Pfaendler describes the design as "simple, but intelligent and reliable".

The Mosquito Air is the basis for the enclosed cockpit Mosquito XE.

== Specifications (Mosquito Air) ==
Data from Tacke

General characteristics

- Crew: one
- Empty weight: 115 kg (254 lb)
- Gross weight: 240 kg (529 lb)
- Fuel capacity: 19 litres (4.2 imp gal; 5.0 US gal)
- Powerplant: 1 × Zanzottera MZ 202 twin cylinder, air-cooled, two-stroke aircraft engine, 48 kW (64 hp)
- Main rotor diameter: 5.5 m (18 ft 1 in)
- Main rotor area: 24 m^{2} (260 sq ft)

Performance

- Maximum speed: 102 km/h (63 mph, 55 kn)
- Cruise speed: 102 km/h (63 mph, 55 kn)
- Rate of climb: 4 m/s (790 ft/min)
- Disk loading: 10 kg/m^{2} (2.0 lb/sq ft)

== See also ==
- List of rotorcraft
