= Midwest Questar Arrowstar =

American ultralight aircraft

Questar Arrowstar

General information
- Type: Ultralight aircraft
- National origin: United States
- Manufacturer: Midwest Engineering
- Number built: 60 (1998)

History
- Retired: Plans no longer available as of 29 June 2000

The Midwest Questar Arrowstar is an American ultralight aircraft that was designed and produced by Midwest Engineering of Overland Park, Kansas. When it was available the aircraft was supplied in the form of plans for amateur construction, but the plans were withdrawn on 29 June 2000.

== Design and development ==
The Questar Arrowstar was designed to comply with the US FAR 103 Ultralight Vehicles rules, including the category's maximum empty weight of 254 lb (115 kg). The aircraft has a standard empty weight of 230 lb (104 kg).

The aircraft features a strut-braced high-wing, a single-seat open cockpit without a windshield, fixed tricycle landing gear without wheel pants and a single engine in tractor configuration.

The Questar Arrowstar is made from bolted-together 6061-T6 aluminum tubing, with its flying surfaces covered in doped aircraft fabric. Its 27.25 ft (8.3 m) span wing has a wing area of 130.0 sq ft (12.08 m^{2}), is supported by "V" struts and the wing can be detached in ten minutes for ground transport or storage. The acceptable power range is 30 to 40 hp (22 to 30 kW) and the standard engines used are small 30 hp (22 kW) two-stroke powerplants.

The aircraft has a typical empty weight of 230 lb (100 kg) and a gross weight of 450 lb (200 kg), giving a useful load of 220 lb (100 kg). With full fuel of 3 U.S. gallons (11 L; 2.5 imp gal) the payload for the pilot and baggage is 202 lb (92 kg).

The standard day, sea level, no wind, take off distance with a 30 hp (22 kW) engine is 100 ft (30 m) and the landing roll is 80 ft (24 m).

The manufacturer estimated the construction time from the supplied plans as 80 hours.

== Operational history ==
By 1998 the company reported that 170 sets of plans had been sold and that 60 aircraft were completed and flying.

== Specifications (Questar Arrowstar) ==
Data from AeroCrafter

General characteristics

- Crew: one
- Length: 15.00 ft (4.57 m)
- Wingspan: 27.25 ft (8.31 m)
- Wing area: 130.0 sq ft (12.08 m^{2})
- Empty weight: 230 lb (104 kg)
- Gross weight: 450 lb (204 kg)
- Fuel capacity: 3 U.S. gallons (11 L; 2.5 imp gal)
- Powerplant: 1 × two-stroke aircraft engine, 30 hp (22 kW)
- Propellers: 2-bladed wooden

Performance

- Maximum speed: 58 mph (93 km/h, 50 kn)
- Cruise speed: 48 mph (77 km/h, 42 kn)
- Stall speed: 24 mph (39 km/h, 21 kn)
- Service ceiling: 10,000 ft (3,000 m)
- Rate of climb: 600 ft/min (3.0 m/s)
- Wing loading: 3.5 lb/sq ft (17 kg/m^{2})
