= Avion Ridge =

Ridge in Alberta, Canada

Coordinates: 49.169°N 114.105°W

Avion Ridge is a ridge in Alberta, Canada.

Avion is a name derived from French meaning "airplane".
