= Blackjack Cars =

British car manufacturer

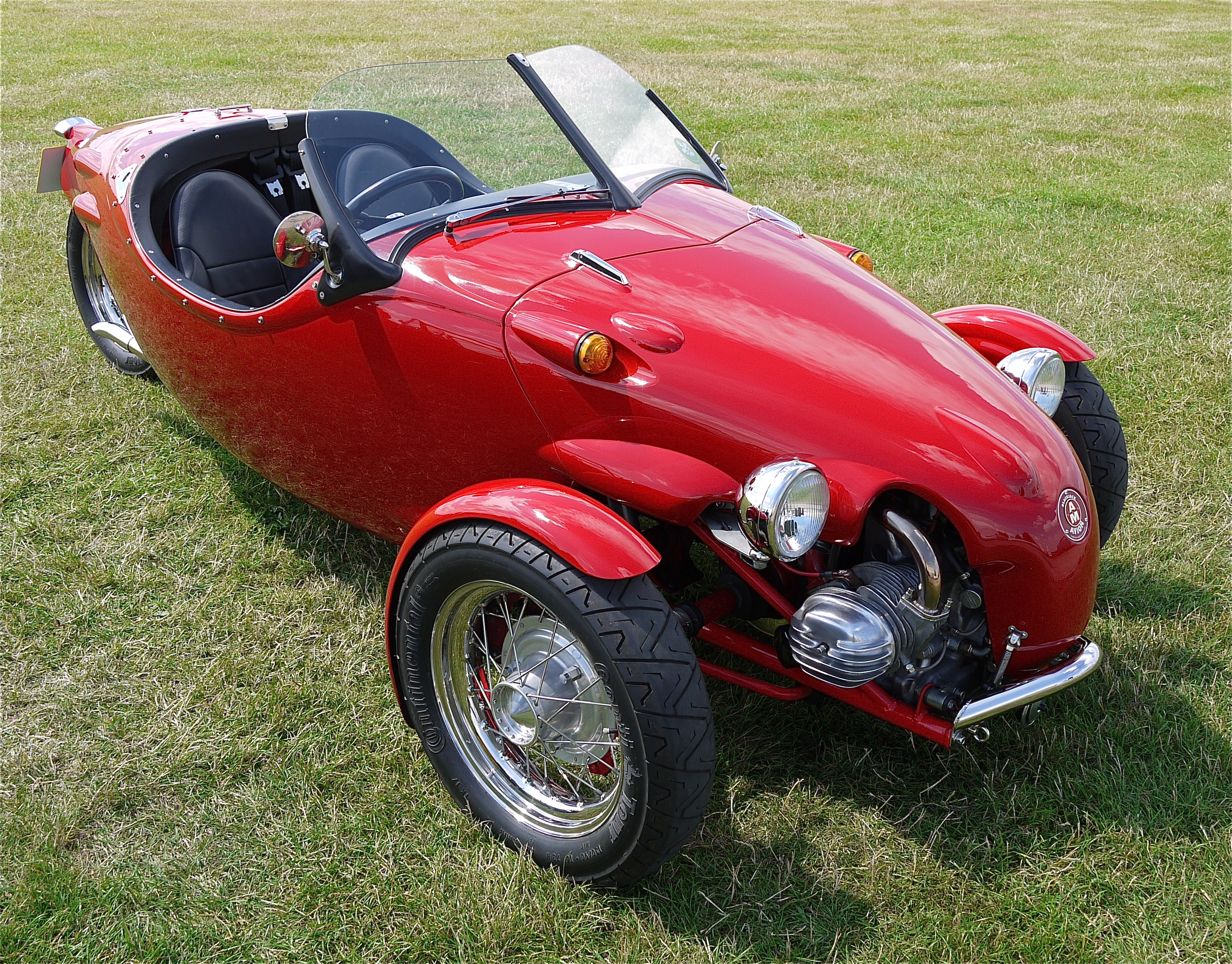
- Blackjack Avion
- Type: Private
- Industry: Motoring
- Founded: 1996
- Founder: Richard Oakes
- Headquarters: Helston, Cornwall, England
- Products: Kit cars

Blackjack cars, founded by Richard Oakes in 1996, was a manufacturer of three-wheeled kit cars based in Helston, Cornwall, England. The company's first car, the Blackjack Avion, was produced from 1996 until 2004, replaced by the VW Beetle-engined Blackjack Zero. In 2008 a lighter variant of the Zero known as the Blackjack Guzzi was introduced, the name derived from the Moto Guzzi motorcycle engine that powers it. Blackjack Zero kits have been unavailable since June 2013.

== Vehicles ==
=== Blackjack Avion ===
The styling of the two front wheel and single rear-wheeled Avion is based on the pre-war Morgan three-wheeler racing cars. It was launched in 1996 and continued in production until 2004, during which time 69 were built. It uses Citroën 2CV mechanical parts and engine mounted on a steel chassis of Blackjack's own design, all housed in an open-top doorless fibreglass body.

=== Blackjack Zero/Guzzi ===
The Zero is a more performance-oriented car than the Avion, with which it shares its three-wheeled front-wheel drive layout. Introduced in 2005, it was initially powered by a VW Beetle air-cooled engine.

A 2009 review published in The Telegraph praises the "elegant practicality and the production-quality finish" of the Zero.
