= Brock Avion =

American homebuilt aircraft

Avion

General information
- Type: Ultralight aircraft
- National origin: United States
- Manufacturer: Ken Brock Manufacturing
- Status: Production completed

The Brock Avion (English: airplane) is an American ultralight aircraft that was designed and produced by Ken Brock Manufacturing, a company usually noted for its gyroplanes. The Avion was supplied as a kit for amateur construction.

== Design and development ==
The aircraft was designed to comply with the US FAR 103 Ultralight Vehicles rules, including the category's maximum empty weight of 254 lb (115 kg). The Avion has a standard empty weight of 240 lb (109 kg). The Avion features a strut-braced high-wing, single-seat, open cockpit, single pusher engine configuration, and is equipped with tricycle landing gear.

The aircraft is made from bolted together aluminum tubing, with the wing ribs constructed from stamped aluminum. The wing and tail covering is Dacron sailcloth. Its 34 ft (10.4 m) span wing is supported by "V" lift struts. The tail is mounted to a straight aluminum tube that passes above the pusher propeller. Both the elevator and rudder are all-flying surfaces; the ailerons are full-span. The standard engine fitted was the Rotax 277 of 28 hp (21 kW). The fuel tank was integral with the pilot's seat and common with Brock's gyroplane designs. The pilot sits on the seat in the open air, with no windshield. The landing gear is of tricycle configuration and features a steerable nosewheel and hydraulic brakes. The Avion can be assembled for flight in 30 minutes.

The Avion underwent a complete engineering stress analysis by Bob Hovey, the designer of the Hovey Delta Bird and Hovey Whing Ding II. The Avion was designed to +6/-4g.

== Specifications (Avion) ==
Data from Cliche

General characteristics

- Crew: one
- Wingspan: 34 ft 0 in (10.36 m)
- Wing area: 145 sq ft (13.5 m^{2})
- Empty weight: 240 lb (109 kg)
- Gross weight: 455 lb (206 kg)
- Fuel capacity: 5 U.S. gallons (19 L; 4.2 imp gal)
- Powerplant: 1 × Rotax 277 , 28 hp (21 kW)

Performance

- Maximum speed: 52 mph (84 km/h, 45 kn)
- Cruise speed: 48 mph (77 km/h, 42 kn)
- Stall speed: 27 mph (43 km/h, 23 kn)
- g limits: +6/-4
- Rate of climb: 700 ft/min (3.6 m/s)
