= Canton of Avion =

Coordinates: 50°24′10″N 2°50′22″E

Avion
- Canton
- Location of Avion within the department
- Country: France
- Region: Hauts-de-France
- Department: Pas-de-Calais
- No. of communes: {{{nbcomm}}}
- Area: 27.43 km^{2} (10.59 sq mi)
- Population (2023): 39,044
  - Density: 1,423/km^{2} (3,687/sq mi)
- INSEE code: 62 08

The Canton of Avion is a canton situated in the department of the Pas-de-Calais and in the Hauts-de-France region of northern France.

== Composition ==
At the French canton reorganisation which came into effect in March 2015, the canton was expanded from 2 to 4 communes:

- Acheville
- Avion
- Méricourt
- Sallaumines

== See also ==
- Cantons of Pas-de-Calais
- Communes of Pas-de-Calais
- Arrondissements of the Pas-de-Calais department
