= Midwest Questar XLS =

American ultralight aircraft

Questar XLS

General information
- Type: Ultralight aircraft
- National origin: United States
- Manufacturer: Midwest Engineering
- Number built: 10 (1998)

History
- Retired: Plans no longer available as of 29 June 2000

The Midwest Questar XLS is an American ultralight aircraft that was designed and produced by Midwest Engineering of Overland Park, Kansas. When it was available the aircraft was supplied in the form of plans for amateur construction, but the plans were withdrawn on 29 June 2000.

== Design and development ==
The Questar XLS was designed to comply with the US FAR 103 Ultralight Vehicles rules, including the category's maximum empty weight of 254 lb (115 kg). The aircraft has a standard empty weight of 240 lb (109 kg).

The aircraft features a strut-braced high-wing, a single-seat open cockpit without a windshield, fixed tricycle landing gear without wheel pants and a single engine in pusher configuration.

The Questar XLS is made from bolted-together 6061-T6 aluminum tubing, with its flying surfaces covered in doped aircraft fabric. Its 31.30 ft (9.5 m) span wing has a wing area of 146.0 sq ft (13.56 m^{2}), is supported by "V" struts and the wing can be detached in ten minutes for ground transport or storage. The acceptable power range is 30 to 40 hp (22 to 30 kW) and the standard engines used are small 30 hp (22 kW) two-stroke powerplants.

The aircraft has a typical empty weight of 240 lb (110 kg) and a gross weight of 500 lb (230 kg), giving a useful load of 260 lb (120 kg). With full fuel of 5 U.S. gallons (19 L; 4.2 imp gal) the payload for the pilot and baggage is 230 lb (100 kg).

The standard day, sea level, no wind, take off distance with a 30 hp (22 kW) engine is 100 ft (30 m) and the landing roll is 80 ft (24 m).

The manufacturer estimated the construction time from the supplied plans as 200 hours.

== Operational history ==
By 1998 the company reported that 70 sets of plans had been sold and that 10 aircraft were completed and flying.

== Specifications (Questar XLS) ==
Data from AeroCrafter

General characteristics

- Crew: one
- Length: 17.00 ft (5.18 m)
- Wingspan: 31.30 ft (9.54 m)
- Wing area: 146.0 sq ft (13.56 m^{2})
- Empty weight: 240 lb (109 kg)
- Gross weight: 500 lb (227 kg)
- Fuel capacity: 5 U.S. gallons (19 L; 4.2 imp gal)
- Powerplant: 1 × two-stroke aircraft engine, 30 hp (22 kW)
- Propellers: 2-bladed wooden

Performance

- Maximum speed: 54 mph (87 km/h, 47 kn)
- Cruise speed: 45 mph (72 km/h, 39 kn)
- Stall speed: 24 mph (39 km/h, 21 kn)
- Rate of climb: 580 ft/min (2.9 m/s)
- Wing loading: 3.4 lb/sq ft (17 kg/m^{2})
