= Avion, Pas-de-Calais =

Avion
- Commune
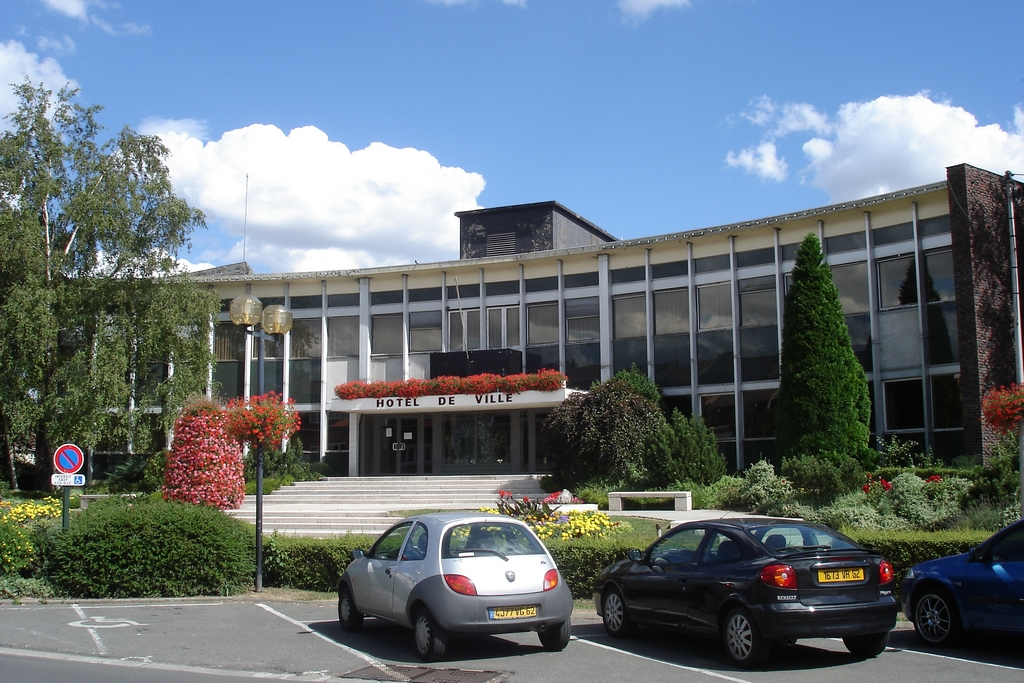
- The town hall of Avion

- Coat of arms
- Location of Avion
- Location within France Location within Hauts-de-France
- Coordinates: 50°24′36″N 2°50′01″E
- Country: France
- Region: Hauts-de-France
- Department: Pas-de-Calais
- Arrondissement: Lens
- Canton: Avion
- Intercommunality: Communaupole de Lens-Liévin

Government
  - Mayor (2023–2026): Jean Letoquart
- Area^{1}: 13.04 km^{2} (5.03 sq mi)
- Elevation: 52 m (171 ft)
- Highest elevation: 77 m (253 ft)
- Lowest elevation: 27 m (89 ft)
- Population (2023): 17,435
  - Density: 1,337/km^{2} (3,463/sq mi)
- Time zone: UTC+01:00 (CET)
  - Summer (DST): UTC+02:00 (CEST)
- INSEE/Postal code: 62065 /62210
- ^{1} French Land Register data, which excludes lakes, ponds, glaciers > 1 km^{2} (0.386 sq mi or 247 acres) and river estuaries.

Avion (French pronunciation: [avjɔ̃]) is a commune in the Pas-de-Calais department in the Hauts-de-France region of France.

== Geography ==
An ex-coal mining industrial town, with a little farming, situated just 1 mile (1.6 km) south of Lens at the junction of the N17, D40 and D55 roads.

== Population ==
Historical population
Year	Pop.	±% p.a.
1968	22,422	—
1975	22,894	+0.30%
1982	21,023	−1.21%
1990	18,534	−1.56%
1999	18,298	−0.14%
2007	17,653	−0.45%
2012	18,168	+0.58%
2017	17,622	−0.61%
2023	17,435	−0.18%
Source: INSEE

== Sights ==
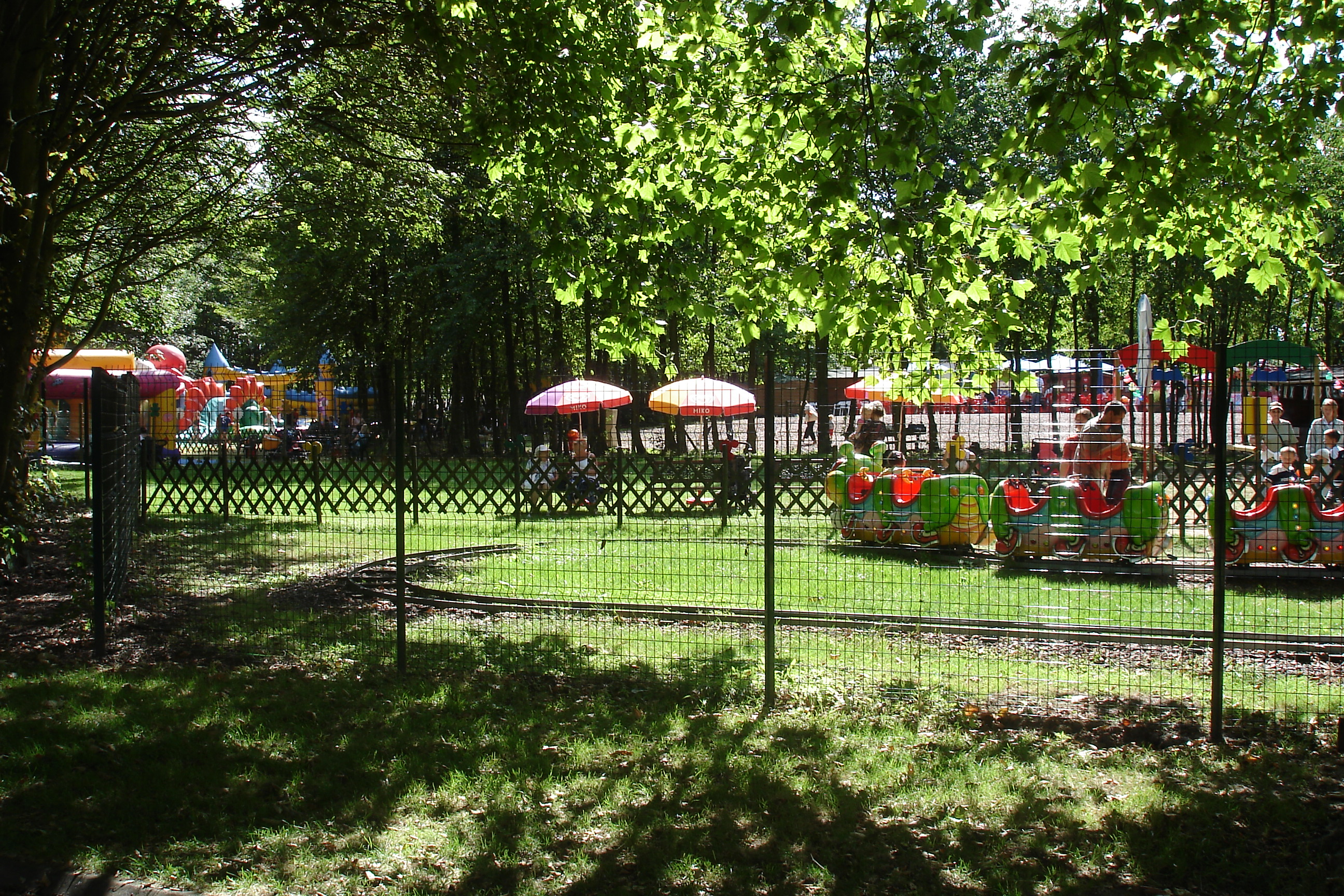
The amusement park « Ch'ti Parc »

* The church of St. Eloi, rebuilt, as was most of the village, after the First World War.

- The modern church of St. Denis.
- The war memorial.
- The nearby Commonwealth War Graves Commission cemetery.
- The nearby Canadian National Vimy Memorial

== International relations ==
Avion is twinned with:

- Doncaster, England, since May 1981.
- Oelsnitz/Erzgebirge, Germany since 1961.
- Zgorzelec, Poland since 1987.
- Zagorje ob Savi, Slovenia since 1961.

== Photographs ==
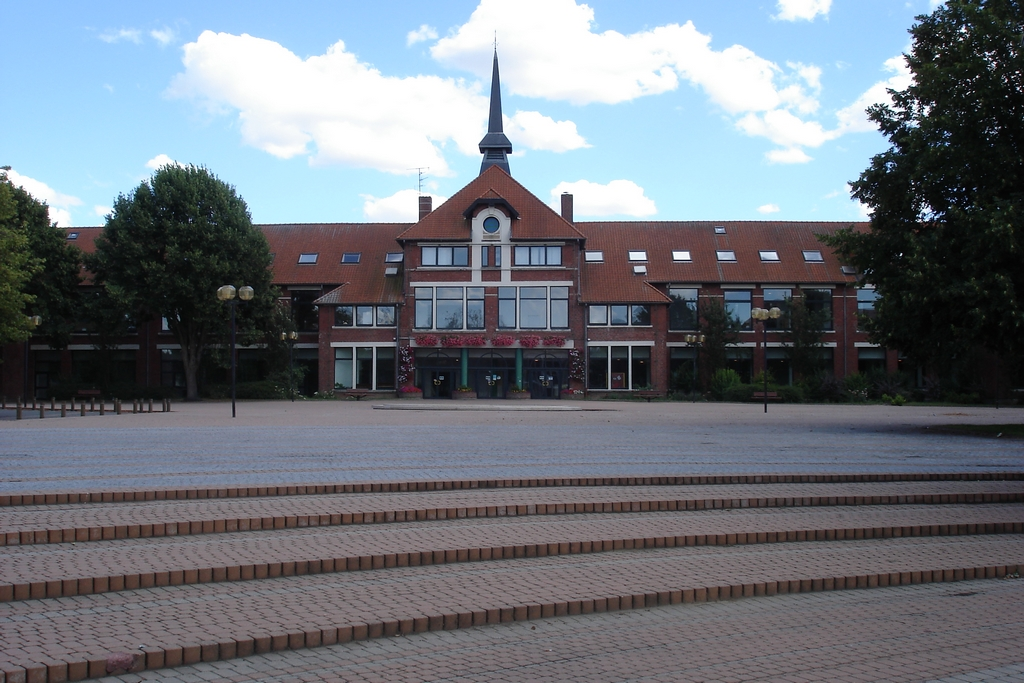
The library and Place des Droits de l'Enfant

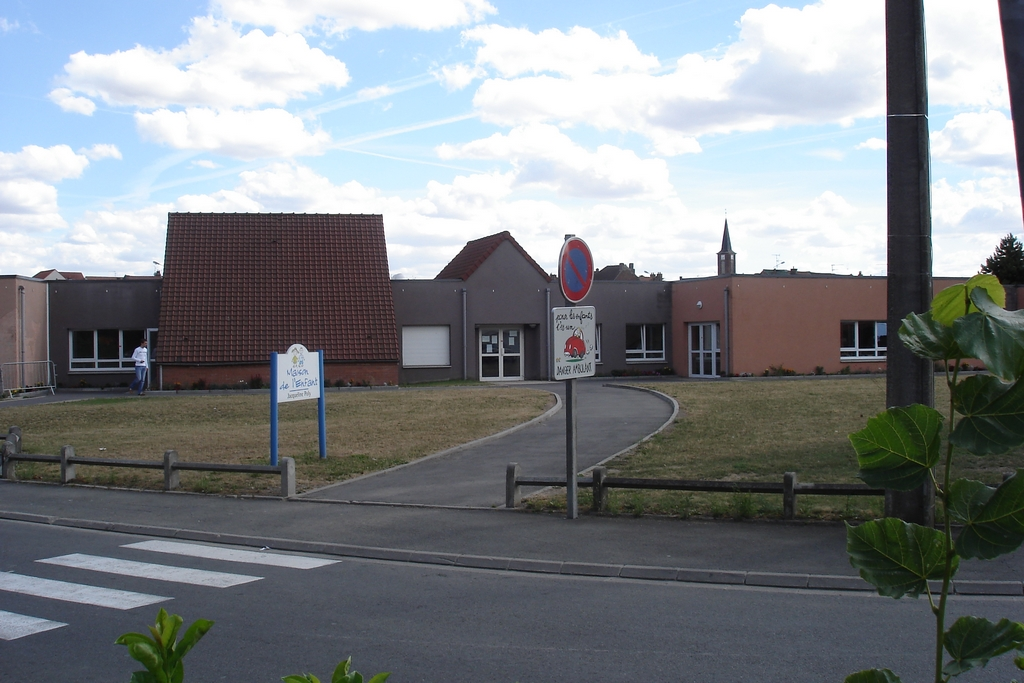
La Maison de l'Enfant

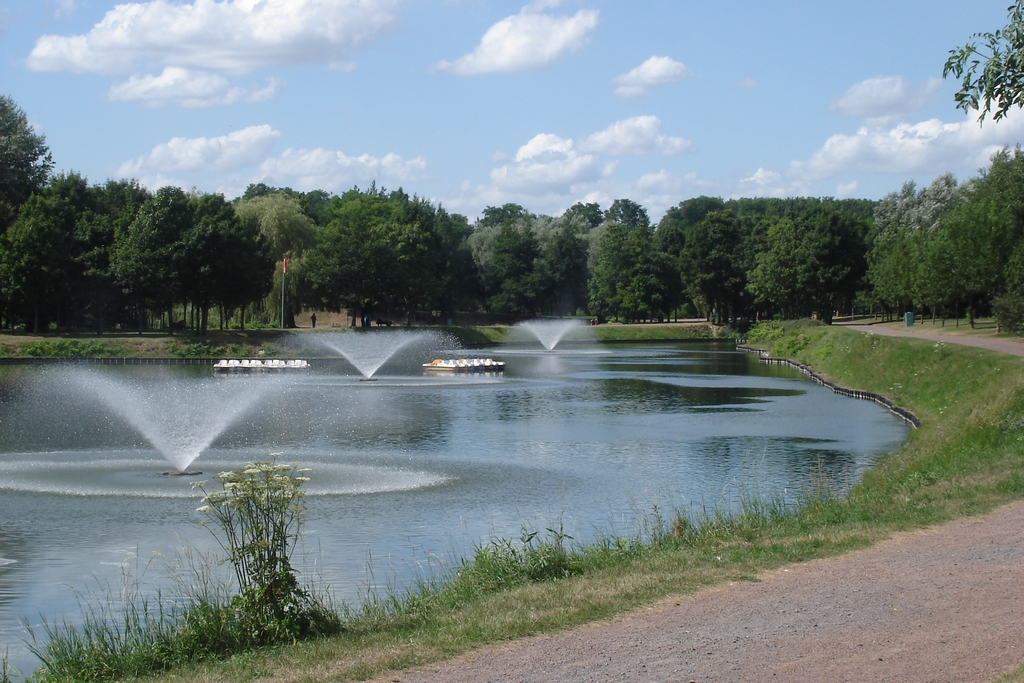
One of lakes in the parc Glissoire

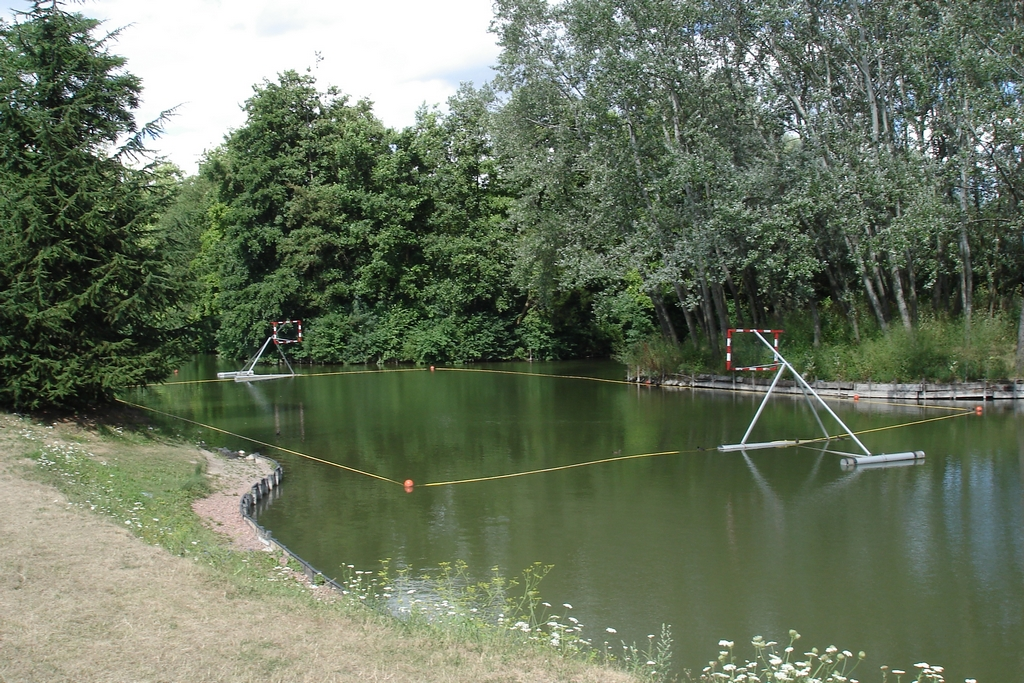
The canoe course in the parc Glissoire

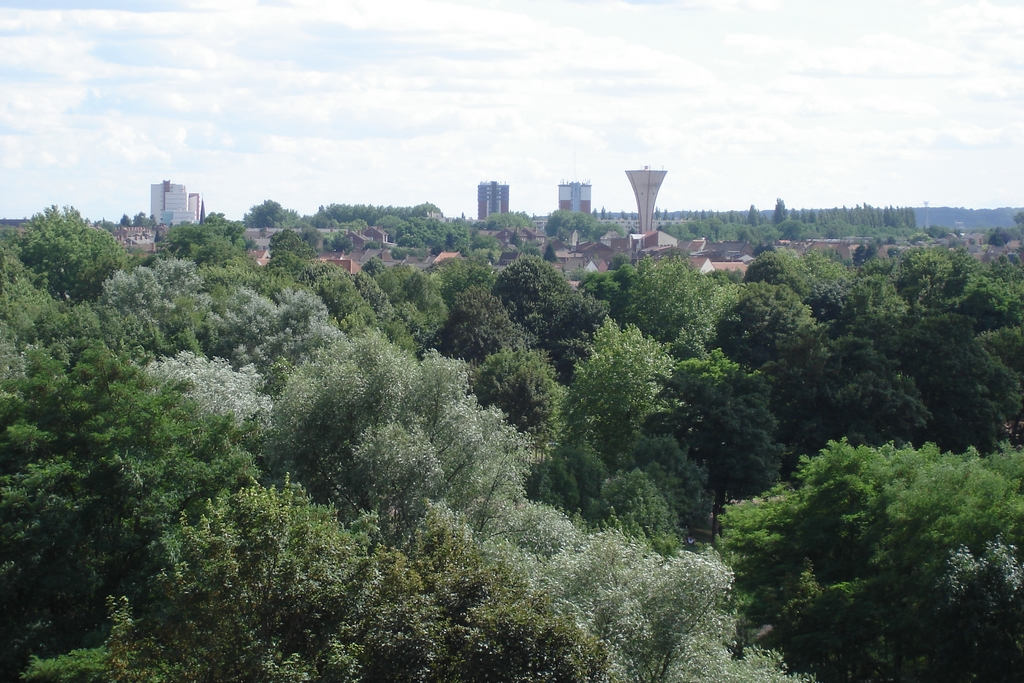
The city of the Republic view from the top of the slag heap in the parc Glissoire

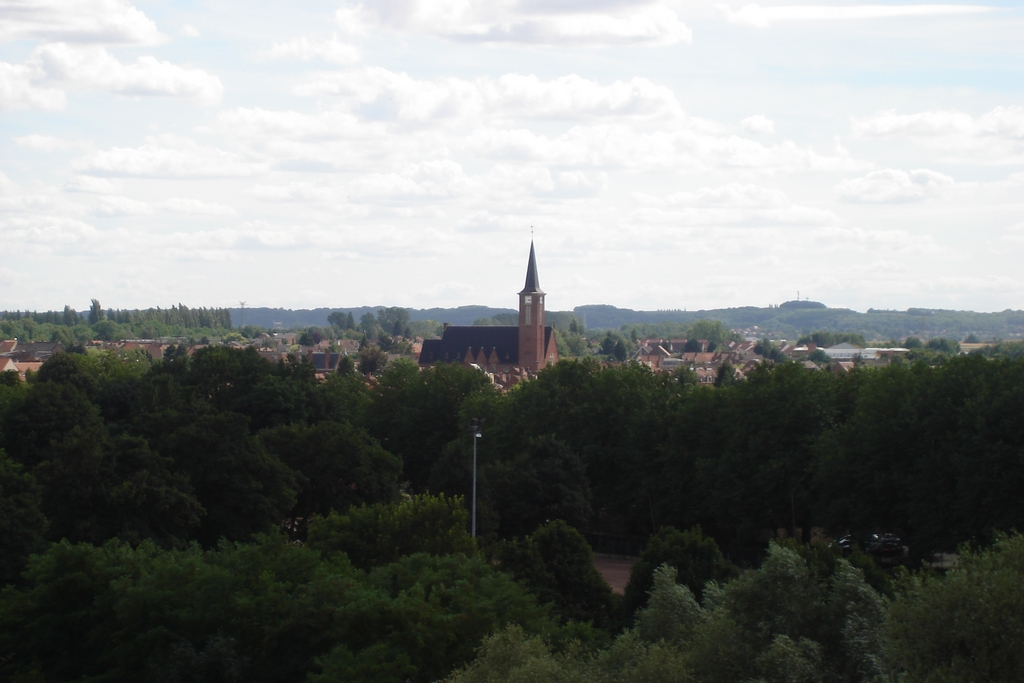
The church from the top of the spoil heap in the park of the Glissoire

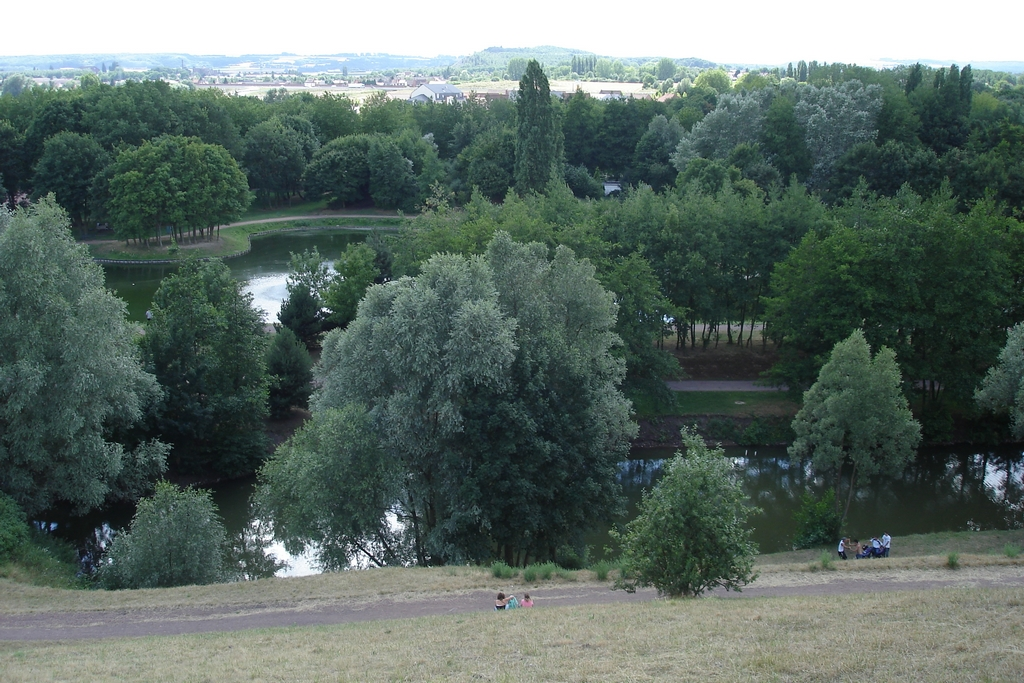
The Parc Glissoire

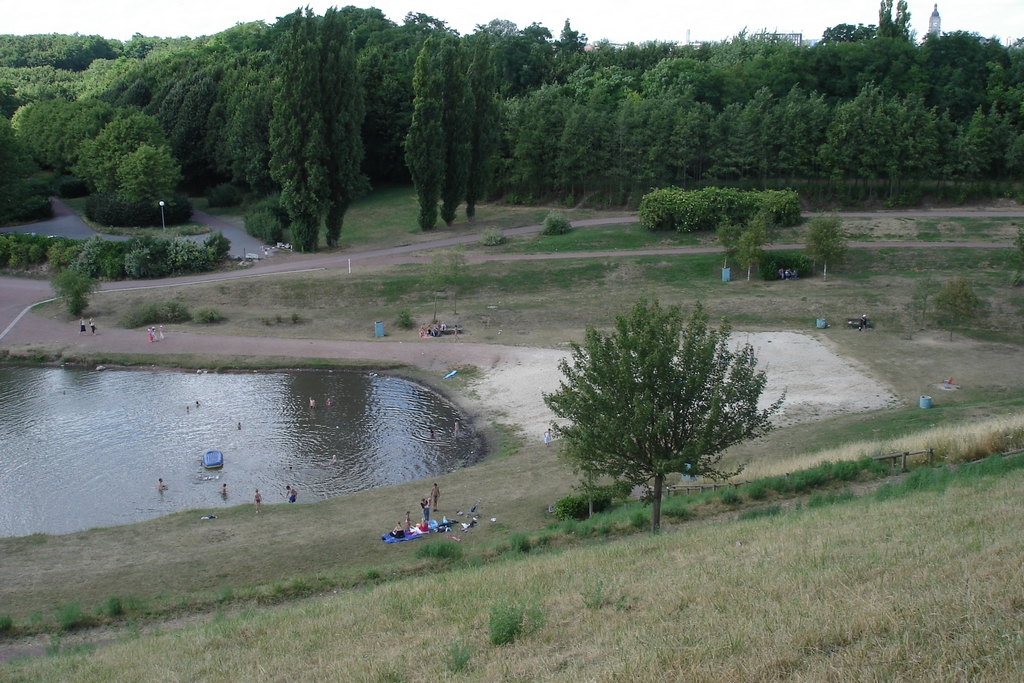
The bathing area view in the parc Glissoire

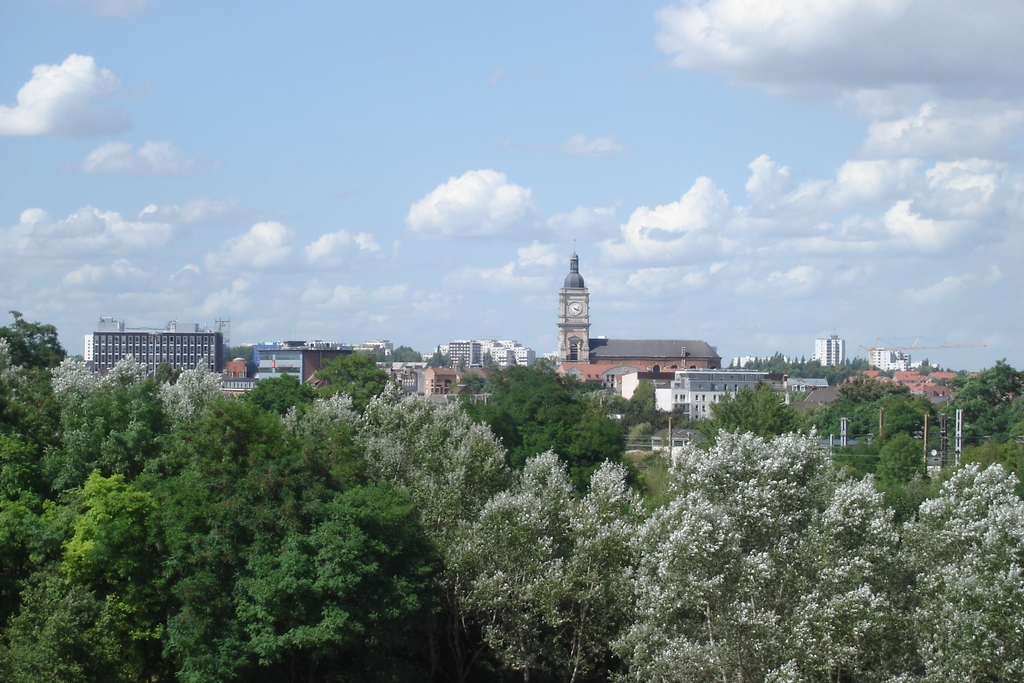
The city of Lens view from the top of the slagheap

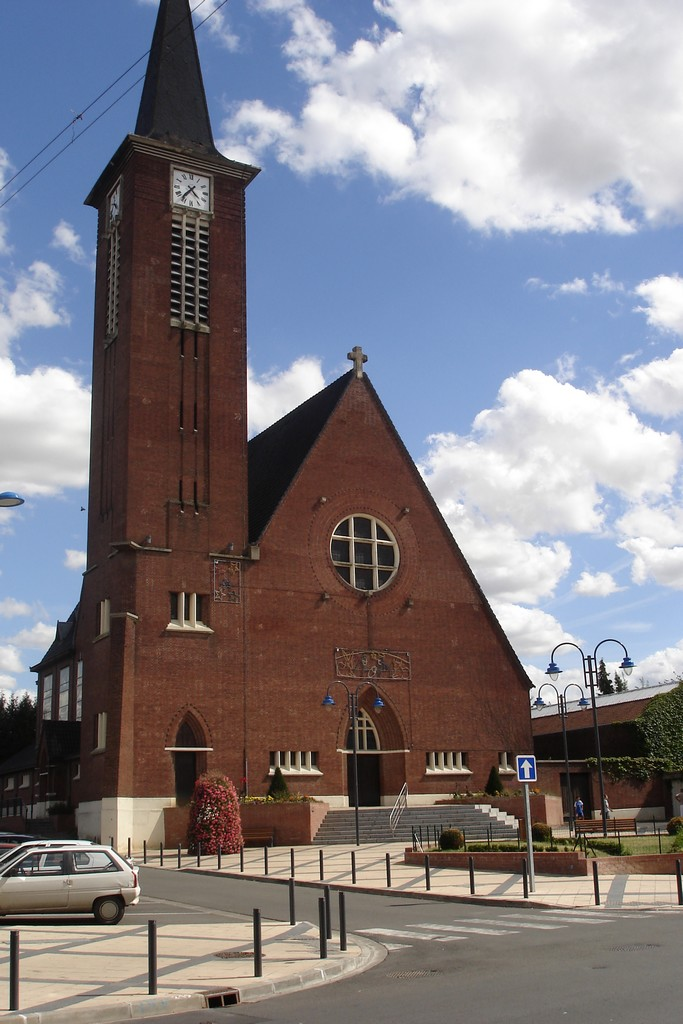
The church of Avion

== See also ==
- Communes of the Pas-de-Calais department
