= Avion (car) =

Prototype sports car

- Industry: Automotive
- Founded: 1986
- Founder: Craig Henderson; Bill Green
- Headquarters: Bellingham, Washington, United States
- Products: Avion

The Avion is a prototype sports car that achieves over 119 miles per US gallon (1.98 L/100 km) driving on interstate highways in real world conditions.

The Avion is based on the concept that fuel economy is largely determined by minimizing drag, rolling resistance and weight and matching gear ratio to the required horsepower. The Avion uses existing automotive components, an existing high-efficiency automotive diesel engine and marries them to a lightweight aluminum frame and highly aerodynamic composite body.

The Avion was an official contender in the Progressive Insurance Automotive X Prize.

== History ==
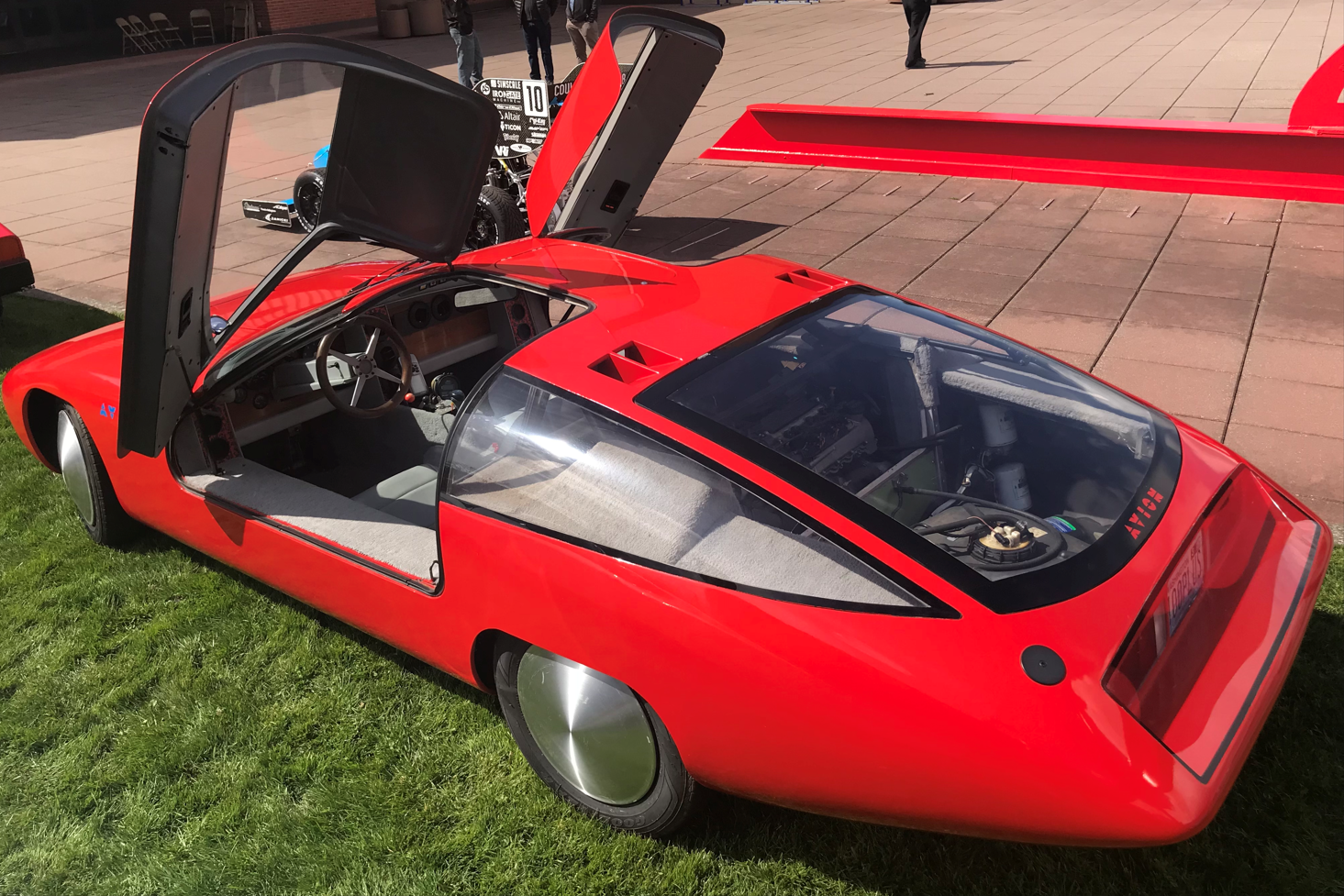
The Avion on display in 2022

The Avion was built by Craig Henderson and Bill Green after they graduated from Western Washington University in Bellingham, Washington, where they had studied at the Vehicle Research Institute. The prototype was completed in 1984, and entered the Three Flags Econo Rally driving from the Mexican border to the Canadian border and was displayed in the Expo 86. During the 1986 contest the Avion set a Guinness World Record for at 103.7 mpg.

In 2010, Henderson drove the Avion from The Canada border to the Mexico Border averaging 119.1 real world miles per gallon of diesel and without refueling, resetting his record from 1986.

Henderson later drove the Avion from Bellingham, Washington to Portland, Oregon, achieving 113.1 mpg.

As of October 2023, the car is on display at the San Diego Air & Space Museum.

== Vehicle ==
The car was designed to be manufactured in small volume using existing automotive components as a kit car. It features a lightweight composite body of highly aerodynamic design with butterfly doors attached to an aluminum frame. The Avion can run on regular diesel or biodiesel.
