= Avion (band) =

Australian musical group

- Also known as: Lionheart
- Origin: Sydney, New South Wales, Australia
- Genres: Pop rock
- Years active: 1981–1987
- Labels: RCA, EMI
- Past members: Evan Murray; Martyn Toole; John Waller; Kendall Waller; Randall Waller; Paul Gannell

Avion were an Australian 1980s pop rock band formed in 1981, originally named Lionheart, the line-up was Evan Murray on keyboards, Martyn Toole on guitar, and three brothers: John Waller on drums, Kendall Waller on bass guitar and Randall Waller on lead vocals and lead guitar. The group issued two albums, Avion (1983) and White Noise (1987). Late in 1987, Murray died in a car accident and the group disbanded. According to Australian rock music historian, Ian McFarlane, the group had "a strong cult following ... [with their] brand of melodic, American-influenced Adult Oriented Rock ... [but] met with virtual indifference at home".

== History ==
Avion's lead guitarist and lead singer, Randall Waller had previously released two albums as a solo artist, Oasis (1978) and Midnight Fire (1980). In 1981 Waller formed pop rock group Lionheart in Sydney with Evan Murray on keyboards, Martyn Toole on guitar, and his two brothers: John Waller on drums and Kendall Waller on bass guitar – the group was soon renamed as Avion. Avion signed with RCA Records and, in September 1983, released their debut self-titled album. Despite being mixed by Bob Clearmountain at the Power Station recording studio in New York City, the album was not a success. The album spawned three singles, "I Need You" (March 1983), "Diamond Eyes" (September) and "Never Let Me Go" (October) which were not successful. AllMusic described the album, "its overwrought AOR sound and simplistic lyrics failing to secure significant sales".

In August 1984 the group issued a non-album single, "Still the Night". Paul Gannell replaced Toole on guitar and, in September 1985, released "We've Got Secrets" on RCA. In 1986, the band signed a deal with EMI Records and "Celebration" appeared in September. In 1987 the band's second album, White Noise, followed "but the more considered songwriting failed to produce an upturn in Avion's career". It also lacked airplay, and was not a success – the group was dropped by EMI. In April 1987 they released the third single from the album, "Berlin Wall". In September 1987 Evan Murray died in a car accident while the group were on tour and the band essentially disbanded. According to Australian rock music historian, Ian McFarlane, the group had "a strong cult following ... [with their] brand of melodic, American-influenced Adult Oriented Rock ... [but] met with virtual indifference at home". Randall Waller was briefly a member of Sharon O'Neill's backing band before relocating to United Kingdom from 1988 to 1993 where he worked as a record producer and engineer. In 1992, Waller laid down vocals for the "Surrender Absolute" album by David Zaffiro (Intense Records). As of 1998, he was playing guitar for Shania Twain's band.

== Discography ==
=== Albums ===
List of albums, with selected chart positions
Title	Album details	Peak chart positions
Title	Album details	AUS
Avion	Released: September 1983; Label: RCA Records	48
White Noise	Released: 1987; Label: EMI Records	-

=== Singles ===
List of singles, with selected chart positions
Title	Year	Chart positions
Title	Year	AUS
"I Need You"	1983	61
"Diamond Eyes"	1983	-
"Never Let Me Go"	1983	-
"Still the Night"	1984	-
"We've Got Secrets"	1985	-
"Celebration"	1986	-
"Berlin Wall"	1987	-
