= Zanzottera MZ 34 =

Family of single-cylinder, two-stroke, single ignition aircraft engines

MZ 34 & MZ 35
- Type: Two-stroke aircraft engine
- National origin: Italy
- Manufacturer: Zanzottera Technologies; Compact Radial Engines; Fiate Aviation

The Zanzottera MZ 34 and MZ 35 are a family of single-cylinder, two-stroke, single ignition aircraft engines designed for powered paragliders, one and two place powered parachutes, single place ultralight trikes, light single place ultralight aircraft and motor gliders.

The engine was originally designed and produced by Zanzottera Technologies of Italy, but the design was sold, along with the rest of the company's two-stroke ultralight aircraft engine line to Compact Radial Engines of Surrey, British Columbia, Canada. Compact Radial Engines was then in turn acquired by Fiate Aviation Co., Ltd. of Hefei, Anhui, China in August 2017.

== Development ==
The MZ 34 and 35 both have a cylinder barrel that is Nikasil-coated. The engine features a decompression channel to allow easier recoil starting, a tuned exhaust system and a belt-type reduction drive. Starting options include a recoil or electric starter.

Earlier versions produced 26 hp (19 kW) at 6250 rpm or 38 hp (28 kW) with a tuned exhaust at 6450 rpm. The Compact Radial Engines production engine is rated at 27.5 hp (21 kW) at 6250 rpm. Reduction ratios available are 1.84, 2.05, 2.14, 2.24 and 2.34 to 1.

The owners manual acknowledges the limitations inherent in the design of the engine, stating:

This is not an aeronautics approved engine.

This engine has not been subjected to durability and safety tests in compliance with aeronautical standards. It is designed to be used in paramotors and ULM or aeroplanes where engine failure will not produce serious consequences. The user must assume responsibility for all risks deriving from the use of this engine and must understand that this engine is subject to sudden failure. Engine failure may result in an emergency landing. Such accidents may cause serious material damage and injuries.

Never use an aircraft fitted with this engine in areas or at conditions and altitudes which may cause problems if forced to land as a result of sudden engine failure.

== Variants ==
MZ 34
Single cylinder, two stroke single ignition aircraft engine optimized for powered paragliders, one and two place powered parachutes, single place ultralight trikes, light single place ultralight aircraft
MZ 35
Single cylinder, two stroke single ignition aircraft engine with a narrower profile, optimized for motor-gliders

== Applications ==
- Aviastroitel AC-5M
- Belite Aircraft Superlite
- The Butterfly Super Sky Cycle
- Earthstar Thunder Gull
- Fly Products Power
- North Wing ATF
- Paraavis Vityaz
- Paramotor Inc FX5
- SNAS Stryke-Air Bi
- Skyrunner Powerful
- Spartan DFS Trike
- Wrobel Vroby 2

== Specifications (MZ 34) ==
Data from Instruction and Maintenance Manual MZ34/35

=== General characteristics ===
- Type: Single cylinder, two-stroke aircraft engine
- Bore: 76 mm (2.99 in)
- Stroke: 69 mm (2.72 in)
- Displacement: 313 cc (19.10 cu in)
- Length: 296 mm (11.65 in)
- Height: 410 mm (16.14 in)
- Dry weight: 17 kg (37 lb) with engine mount and silent-block mountings, starter motor, manual starter, reduction drive and muffler

=== Components ===
- Valvetrain: Reed valve induction
- Oil system: 50:1 oil to fuel, premixed
- Cooling system: air cooled
- Reduction gear: Belt drive with optional ratios of 1.84, 2.05, 2.14, 2.24 or 2.34 to 1

=== Performance ===
- Power output: 27.5 hp (21 kW) at 6250 rpm
- Compression ratio: 9.6:1

== See also ==
- Hirth F-33
- Rotax 277
