= Brock KB-2 =

Brock KB-2 Freedom Machine
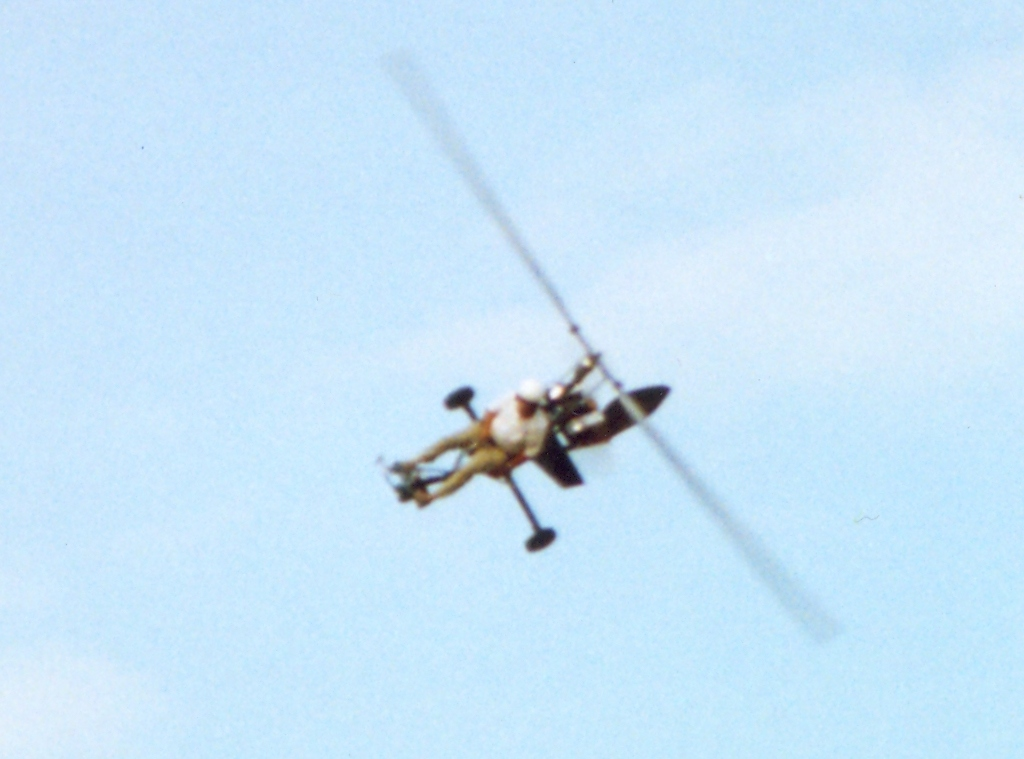
- Ken Brock at Oshkosh 2001

General information
- Type: Autogyro
- National origin: United States of America
- Manufacturer: Ken Brock Manufacturing
- Designer: Ken Brock

History
- First flight: 1970
- Developed from: Brock KB-1 Gyroplane

The KB-2 Freedom Machine is an autogyro designed by Ken Brock based on the designs of the Bensen B-8.

== Design and development ==
Ken Brock was an early innovator in homebuilt gyrocopters starting with his first ride in 1957. Brock set to work on building and marketing a series of homebuilt gyroplanes with the KB-1 and later the KB-2.

== Operational history ==
Ken Brock used his KB-2 design for years in airshow acts and completed several world records. In 1971 he completed the first coast-to-coast autogyro flight from Long Beach, California to Kitty Hawk, North Carolina.

== Variants ==
KB-2
Powered variant
KB-2G
Variant with the same frame and rotor head as a KB-2. The "glider" is a two-seat gyroplane designed to be towed by car. The aircraft with the same frame and rotor assembly can be converted to a powered gyroplane.

== Aircraft on display ==
A 1970 demonstrator KB-2 is in the EAA Airventure Museum in Oshkosh, Wisconsin

== Specifications (KB-2) ==
Data from EAA

General characteristics

- Capacity: 1
- Empty weight: 240 lb (109 kg)
- Gross weight: 600 lb (272 kg)
- Powerplant: 1 × McCulloch 4318 , 90 hp (67 kW)
- Main rotor diameter: 2 × 12 ft (3.7 m)

Performance

- Cruise speed: 61 kn (70 mph, 110 km/h)
- Range: 520 nmi (600 mi, 970 km)
- Rate of climb: 1,900 ft/min (9.7 m/s)

== See also ==
Aircraft of comparable role, configuration, and era

- Bensen B-8
- Midwest Hornet
- Taggart Gyrobee
- Wallis WA-116 Agile
