= Hawker Hurricane =

British fighter aircraft of the 1930s and 40s

Hurricane
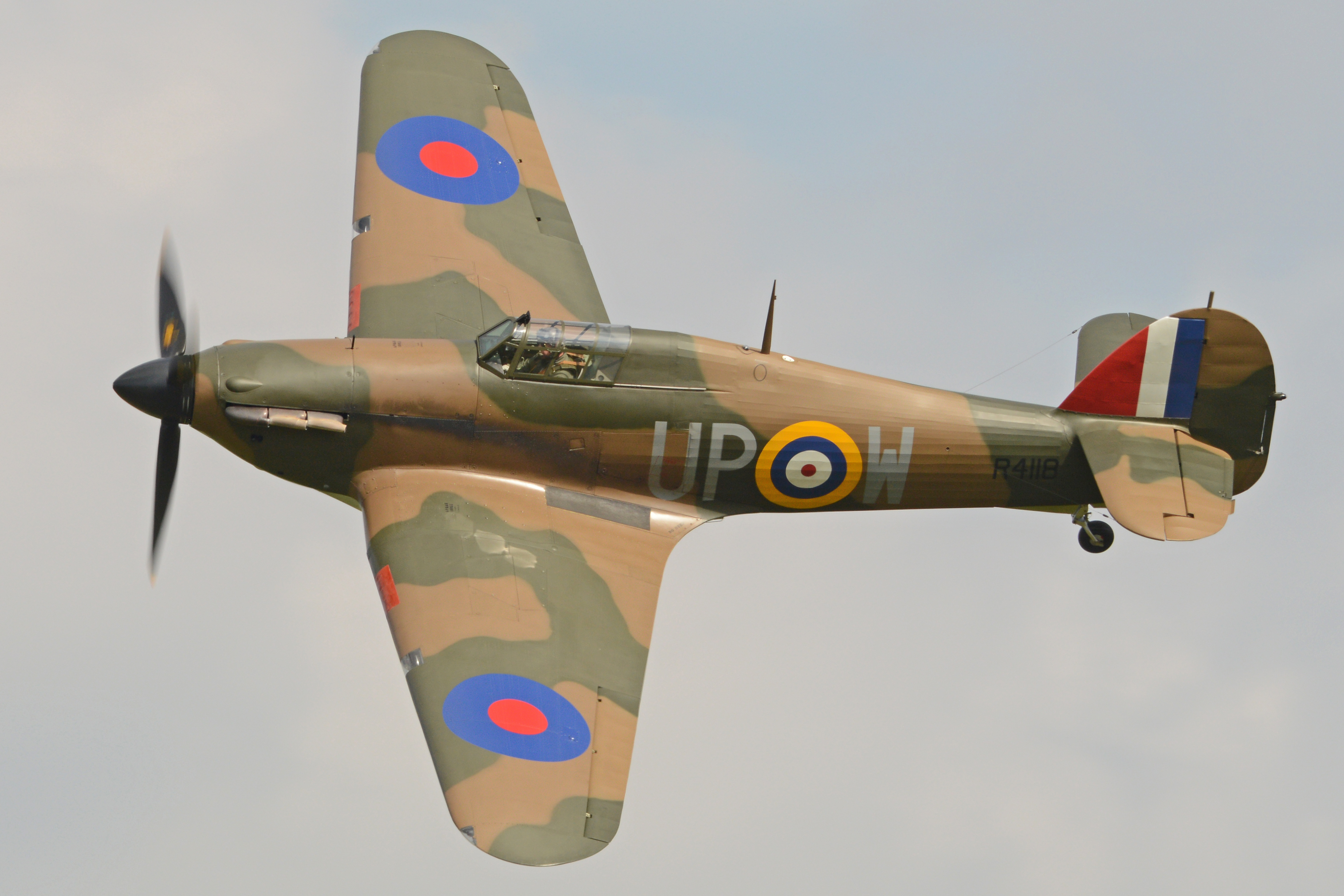
- Hurricane Mk I, R4118, currently the world's only airworthy Hurricane to have fought in the Battle of Britain

General information
- Type: Fighter aircraft
- National origin: United Kingdom
- Manufacturer: Hawker Aircraft
- Designer: Sydney Camm
- Built by: Austin Motor Company; Avions Fairey; Canadian Car and Foundry; Gloster Aircraft Company; Rogožarski; Zmaj Aircraft
- Primary users: Royal Air Force: Royal Canadian Air Force; Royal Navy; Soviet Air Forces
- Number built: 14,487 (UK and Canada)

History
- Manufactured: 1937–1944
- Introduction date: December 1937
- First flight: 6 November 1935

The Hawker Hurricane is a British single-seat fighter aircraft of the 1930s–40s which was designed and predominantly built by Hawker Aircraft Ltd. for service with the Royal Air Force (RAF). It was overshadowed in the public consciousness by the Supermarine Spitfire during the Battle of Britain in 1940, but the Hurricane inflicted 60% of the losses sustained by the Luftwaffe in the campaign and fought in all the major theatres of the Second World War.

The Hurricane originated from discussions between RAF officials and aircraft designer Sir Sydney Camm about a proposed monoplane derivative of the Hawker Fury biplane in the early 1930s. Despite an institutional preference for biplanes and lack of interest by the Air Ministry, Hawker refined its monoplane proposal, incorporating several innovations that became critical to wartime fighter aircraft, including retractable landing gear and the more powerful Rolls-Royce Merlin engine. The Air Ministry ordered Hawker's Interceptor Monoplane in late 1934, and the prototype Hurricane K5083 performed its maiden flight on 6 November 1935.

The Hurricane went into production for the Air Ministry in June 1936 and entered squadron service in December 1937. Its manufacture and maintenance were eased by using conventional construction methods so that squadrons could perform many major repairs without external support. The plane was rapidly procured prior to the outbreak of the Second World War; in September 1939, the RAF had 18 Hurricane-equipped squadrons in service. It was relied upon to defend against German aircraft operated by the Luftwaffe, including dogfighting with Messerschmitt Bf 109s in multiple theatres of action.

The Hurricane was developed through several versions - bomber interceptors, fighter-bombers, and ground-support aircraft, as well as fighters. Versions designed for the Royal Navy known as the Sea Hurricane had modifications including an arrestor hook near the tail, enabling operation from ships. Some were converted as catapult-launched convoy escorts. By the end of production in July 1944, 14,487 units had been completed in Britain and Canada, with others built in Belgium and Yugoslavia.

== Development ==
=== Background ===
During the early 1930s, when Hawker Aircraft company developed the Hurricane, RAF Fighter Command had just 13 squadrons, equipped with the Hawker Fury, Hawker Demon, or the Bristol Bulldog, all biplanes with fixed-pitch wooden propellers and nonretractable undercarriages. At the time, an institutional reluctance existed towards change within the Air Staff; some senior figures were prejudiced against the adoption of monoplane fighter aircraft, while midlevel officers were typically more open-minded.

In 1934, the British Air Ministry issued Specification F.5/34 in response to demands within the RAF for a new generation of fighter aircraft. During 1933, British aircraft designer Sydney Camm had conducted discussions with Major John Buchanan of the Directorate of Technical Development on a monoplane based on the existing Fury. Mason attributes Camm's discussions with figures within the RAF, such as Squadron Leader Ralph Sorley, as having provoked the specification and some of its details, such as the preference for armaments being installed within the wings instead of within the aircraft's nose.

An outline of the "Fury Monoplane" armed with two guns in the wings and two in the nose and powered by the Goshawk engine was prepared and discussed with Roger Liptrot of the Air Ministry in December 1933. The design was reworked with the PV.12, following detailed work working drawings of the "Interceptor Monoplane" were begun in May 1934. The complete design was presented to the Air Ministry on 4 September.

Camm's initial submission in response to the earlier fighter specification F.7/30 was a development of the Fury, the Hawker P.V.3, (Note: PV standing for "private venture", a design manufactured by Hawker without government backing) However, the P.V.3 was not among the proposals which the Air Ministry selected to be built as prototype to official contract. (Note: Competition included the Blackburn F.3, the Bristol Type 123, the Bristol Type 133, the Supermarine Type 224, and the Westland F.7/30) After the rejection of the P.V.3 proposal, Camm started work on a new design involving a cantilever monoplane arrangement with a fixed undercarriage, armed with four machine guns and powered by the Rolls-Royce Goshawk engine. The original 1934 armament specifications for what evolved into the Hurricane were for a similar armament fitment to the Gloster Gladiator - four machine guns, two in the wings and two in the fuselage, synchronised to fire through the propeller arc. By January 1934, the proposal's detail drawings had been finished, but these failed to impress the Air Ministry enough for a prototype to be ordered.

Camm's response to this rejection was to further develop the design, introducing a retractable undercarriage and replacing the unsatisfactory Goshawk engine with a new Rolls-Royce design, initially designated the PV-12, which went on to become famous as the Merlin. In August 1934, a one-tenth scale model of the design was produced and sent to the National Physical Laboratory at Teddington, where a series of wind tunnel tests confirmed the aerodynamics were satisfactory, and in September 1934, Camm again approached the Air Ministry. This time, the ministry's response was favourable, and a prototype of the "Interceptor Monoplane" was promptly ordered.

In July 1934, at a meeting chaired by Air Commodore Arthur Tedder (director of training), the Air Ministry Science Officer Captain F.W. "Gunner" Hill presented his calculation showing that future fighters must carry no fewer than eight machine guns, each capable of firing 1,000 rounds per minute./ Hill's assistant in making his calculations was his 13-year-old daughter Hazel Hill. Of the decision to place eight machine guns in fighters, Claude Hilton Keith, at the time assistant director of armament research and development, said "The battle was brisk and was carried into very high quarters before the implementing authority was given. My Branch had made out a sound case for 8-gun fighters and if this recommendation had not been accepted and we had been content with half-measures, it might indeed have gone ill for us during the late summer of 1940". Present at the meeting was Squadron Leader Ralph Sorley of the Air Ministry's Operational Requirements branch, who played an important role in the decision. In November 1934, the Air Ministry issued Specification F.5/34, which called for new fighter aircraft to be armed with a total of eight guns. By this time, though, work had progressed too far to modify immediately the planned four-gun installation. By January 1935, a wooden mock-up had been finished, and although a number of suggestions for detail changes were made, construction of the prototype was approved, and a new specification (F.36/34) was written around the design. In July 1935, this specification was amended to include installation of eight guns.

The mock-up conference with Air Ministry staff was on 10 January 1935 at Kingston. The ministry order to purchase a prototype to the September proposal was placed on 21 February 1935. At the time, the armament was two Vickers Mark V machine guns in the fuselage and one Browning machine gun in each wing. Work on stressed-skin outer wings to replace the fabric-covered ones began in July, and the contract was altered in August to include another set of wings with eight guns in them; the guns were to be either Vickers or Brownings. These wings were delivered in June 1936.

=== Prototype and trials ===
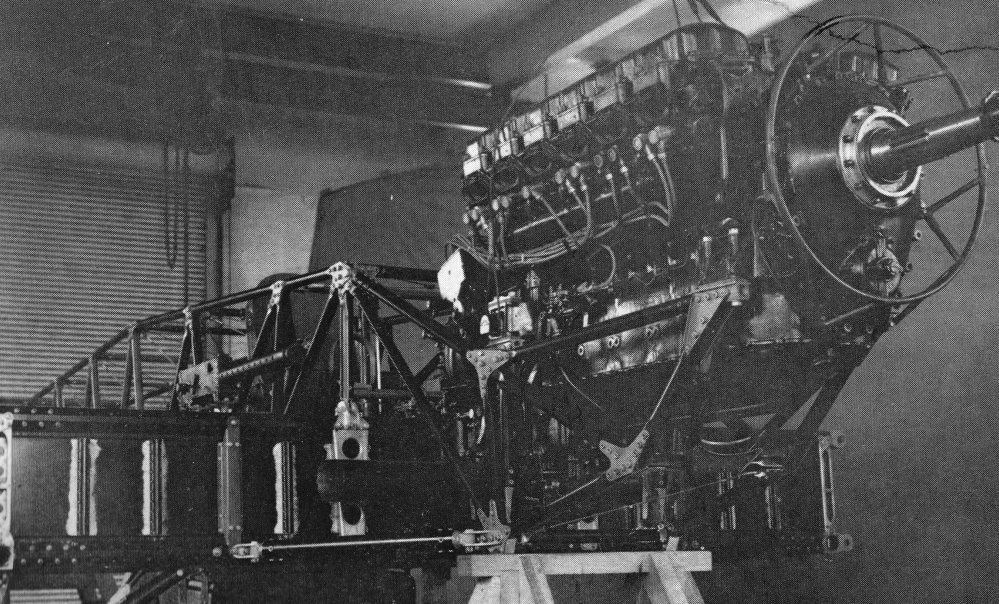
An early mock-up for the Hurricane's fuselage, showing side fuselage-mounted synchronised machine gun, like earlier British biplane fighters

By the end of August 1935, work on the airframe had been completed at Hawker's Kingston upon Thames facility, and the aircraft components were transported to Brooklands, Surrey, where Hawker had an assembly shed; the prototype was fully reassembled on 23 October 1935. Ground testing and taxi trials took place over the following two weeks. On 6 November 1935, the prototype K5083 took to the air for the first time at the hands of Hawker's chief test pilot, Flight Lieutenant George Bulman. Bulman was assisted by two other pilots in subsequent flight testing; Philip Lucas flew some of the experimental test flights, while John Hindmarsh conducted the firm's production flight trials. As completed, the prototype had been fitted with ballast to represent the aircraft's armament prior to the acceptance of the final multigun wing armament.

By March 1936, the prototype had completed 10 flying hours, covering all major portions of the flight envelope. Early testing had gone reasonably well, especially in light of the trial status of the Merlin engine, which had yet to achieve full flight certification at this time, thus severe restrictions had been imposed upon use of the engine. In early 1936, the prototype was transferred to RAF Martlesham Heath, Suffolk, to participate in initial service trials under the direction of Squadron Leader D.F. Anderson. Sammy Wroath, later to be the founding commandant of the Empire Test Pilots' School, was the RAF test pilot for the Hurricane: his report was favourable, stating: "The aircraft is simple and easy to fly and has no apparent vices," and proceeded to praise its control response.

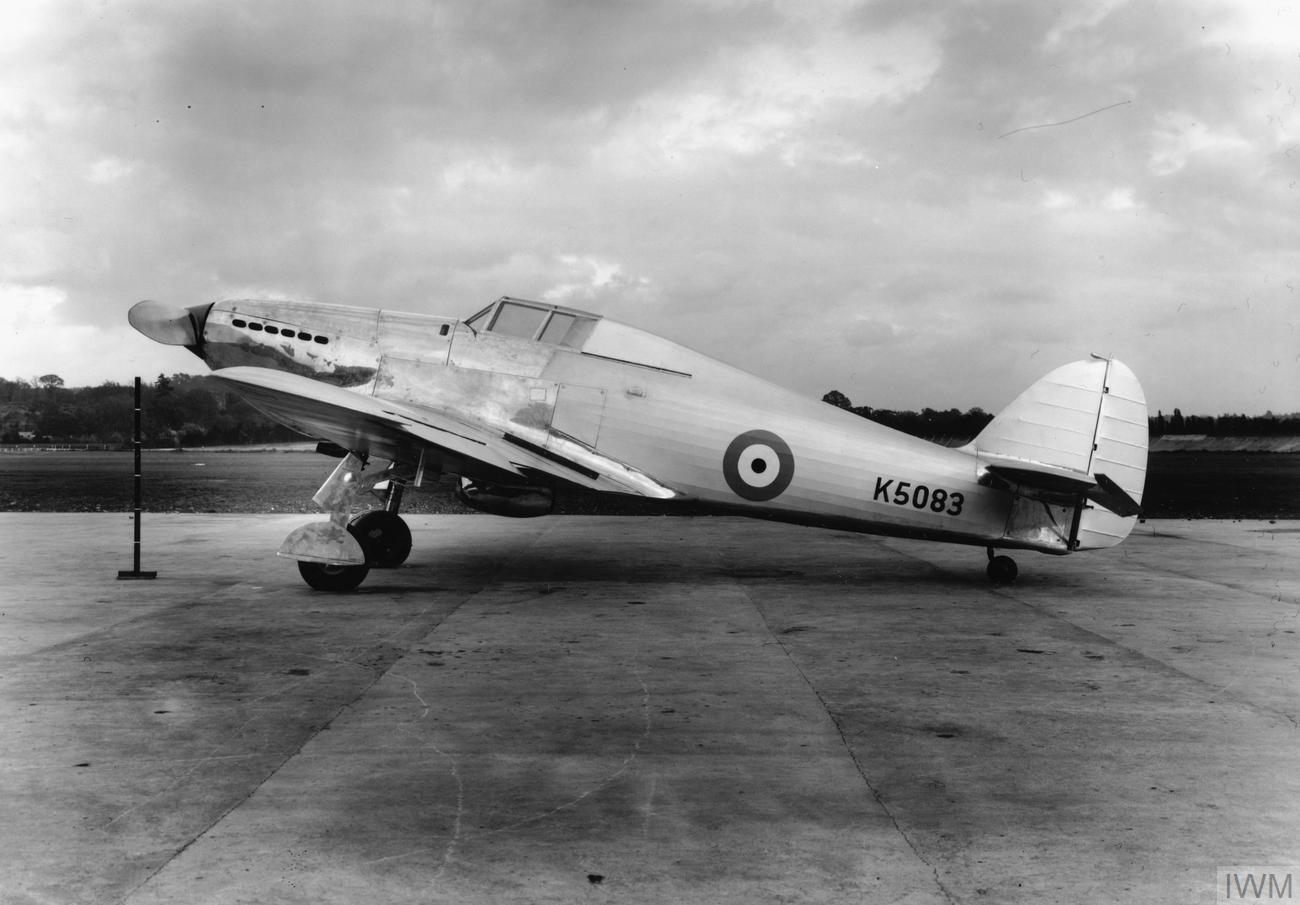
K5083, the prototype, photographed before its first flight in November 1935

In the course of RAF trials, despite the problems with the Merlin engine, which had suffered numerous failures necessitating several changes, enthusiastic reports were produced on the aircraft and its performance. The trials had proved the aircraft to possess a maximum level speed of 315 mph (507 km/h) at an altitude of 16,200 ft (4,900 m), climb to 15,000 ft (4,600 m) in 5.7 minutes, and a stall speed of 57 mph (92 km/h) (only marginally higher than the Gladiator biplane), the last achieved using its flaps.

Further testing found that the Hurricane had poor spin recovery characteristics, in which all rudder authority could be lost due to shielding of the rudder. Hawker's response to the issue was to request that spinning tests be waived, but the Air Ministry refused the request; the situation was resolved by the Royal Aircraft Establishment (RAE), which established that the aerodynamic problem had been caused by a breakdown of the airflow over the lower fuselage, and could be cured by the addition of a small ventral fairing and extension of the bottom of the rudder. This discovery had come too late for the changes to be incorporated in the first production aircraft, but were introduced upon the 61st built and all subsequent aircraft.

Returning from a tour of several German diesel-engine manufacturers, Frank Murdoch realized that impressive weapons plans were underway in Germany. He reported his data to Thomas Sopwith, who tried to convince the British government of the necessity to modernize the RAF. The Air Ministry's initial response was an order for a dozen airplanes. In early 1936, the Hawker board of directors had decided, in the absence of official authorisation and at company expense, to proceed with the issue of the design drawings to the production design office and to start tooling-up for a production line capable of producing a batch of 1,000 Hurricanes.

=== Production ===
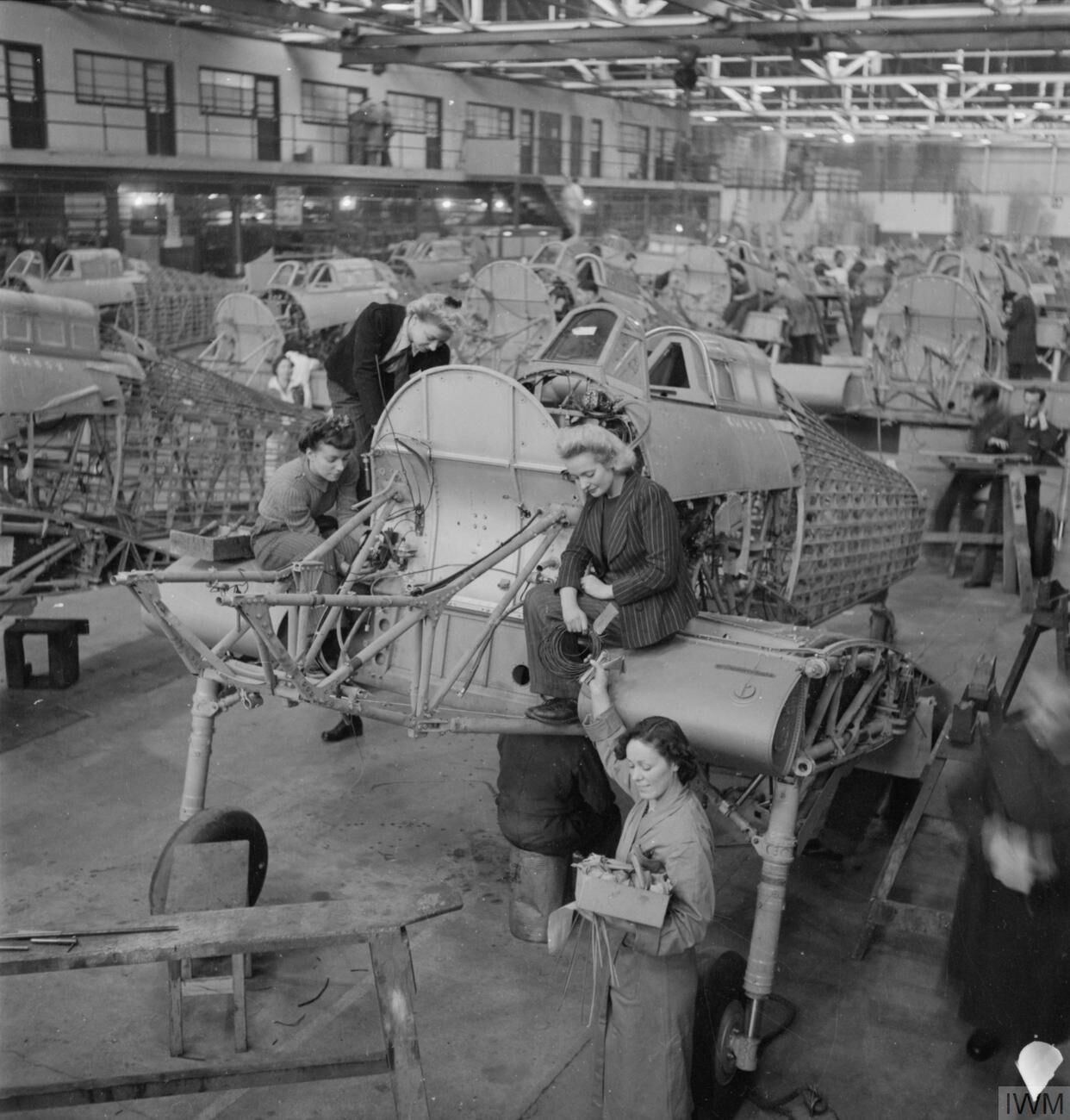
Hurricane production line, 1942

In June 1936, the Air Ministry placed its first order for 600 aircraft. On 26 June 1936, the Air Ministry approved the type name of "Hurricane" that had been proposed by Hawker, and an informal naming ceremony occurred the following month during an official visit by King Edward VIII to Martlesham Heath.

It was significantly cheaper to produce than the Supermarine Spitfire and took 10,300 man hours per airframe to produce, compared to 15,200 for the Spitfire, which had many parts formed by hand, with English wheels. As war was looking likely, and time was of the essence in providing the RAF with an effective fighter, the authorities expected problems with the more advanced Spitfire, while the Hurricane made use of well-proven manufacturing techniques. The service squadrons were also already experienced in maintaining aircraft structurally similar to the Hurricane. A fabric-covered wing was initially adopted to accelerate production, while a higher-performing, stressed-skin metal wing was introduced in late 1939.

The first production Hurricane I first flew on 12 October 1937, flown by Flight Lieutenant Philip Lucas and powered by a Merlin II engine. While a contract for 600 Hurricanes was received on 2 June 1936, deliveries lagged by roughly six months due to a decision in December 1936 to replace the Merlin I with the improved Merlin II, which resulted in many detail alterations.

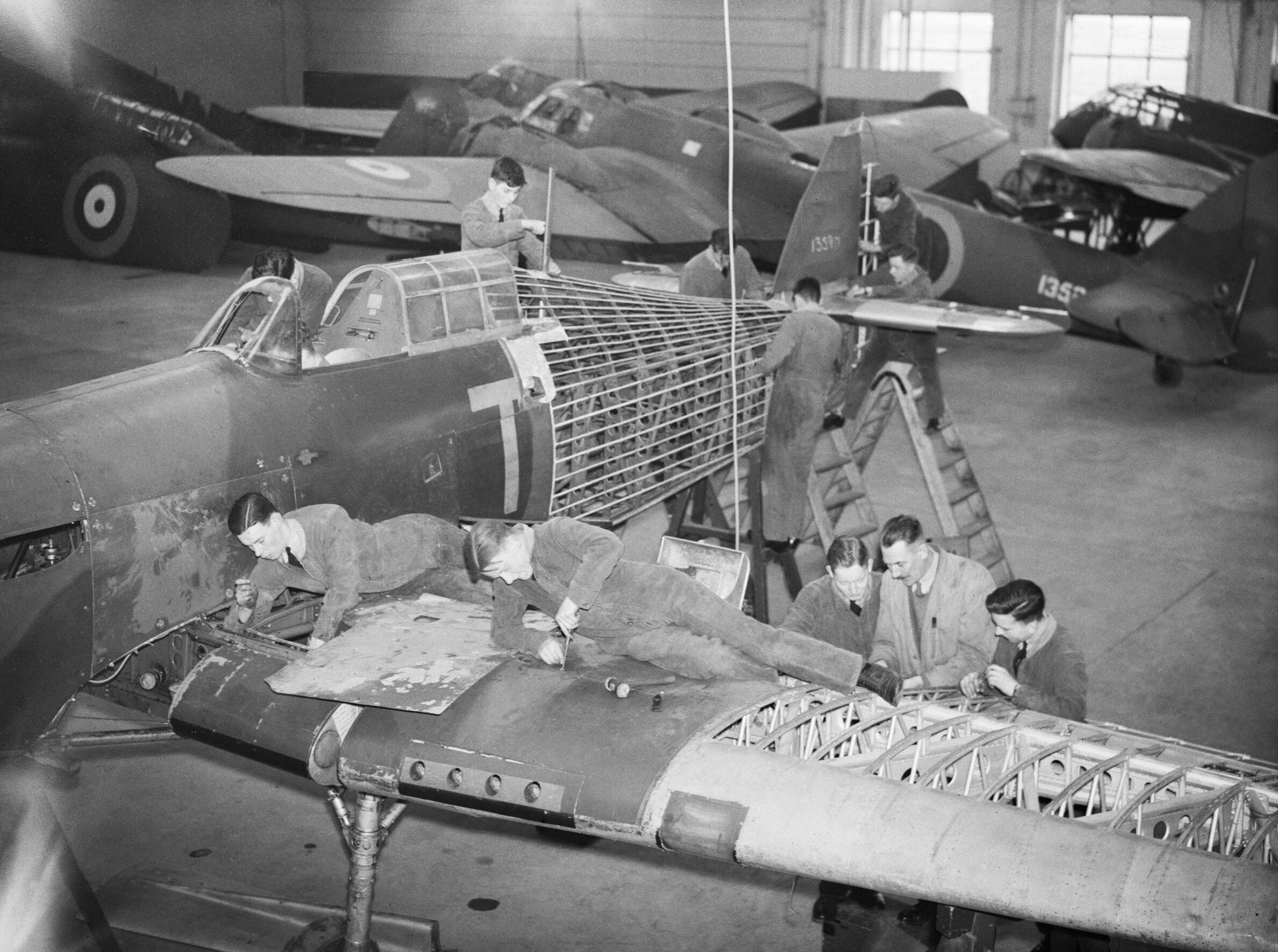
Trainee aircraft fitters working on instructional Hurricanes 1939–1940

Merlin I production ended after 180 were built. This engine had been prioritised for the Fairey Battle light bomber and the Hawker Henley, a failed competitor to the Battle briefly adapted as a target tug, which shared common elements with the Hurricane design. By the following December, the first four aircraft to enter service with the RAF had joined No. 111 Squadron, stationed at RAF Northolt. By February 1938, No. 111 Squadron had received 16 Hurricanes. Upon the outbreak of the Second World War, over 550 Hurricanes had been produced, equipping 18 squadrons, with 3,500 more on order.

During 1940, Lord Beaverbrook, the Minister of Aircraft Production, established the Civilian Repair Organisation through which a number of manufacturers were to repair and overhaul battle-damaged aircraft, including Hurricanes. Some of these were later sent to training units or to other air forces. Factories involved included the Austin Aero Company's Cofton Hackett plant, and David Rosenfield Ltd, based at Barton aerodrome near Manchester.

The Canadian Car and Foundry of Fort William, Ontario, Canada, was a major Hurricane manufacturer, producing them from November 1938 after receiving their initial contract for 40 Hurricanes. The facility's chief engineer, Elsie MacGill, became known as the "Queen of the Hurricanes". The initiative was commercially driven, but was endorsed by the British government. Hawker recognised that a major conflict was inevitable after the Munich Crisis of 1938 and drew up preliminary plans to expand Hurricane production at a new factory in Canada. Under this plan, samples, pattern aircraft, and design documents stored on microfilm were shipped to Canada. In 1938/39 the RCAF ordered 24 Hurricanes to equip one fighter squadron, 20 of which were delivered, and two were supplied to Canadian Car and Foundry as pattern aircraft, but one probably did not arrive, while the other was returned to Britain in 1940. The first Hurricane built at Canadian Car and Foundry was completed in February 1940. Canadian-built Hurricanes shipped to Britain participated in the Battle of Britain.

Overall, some 14,487 Hurricanes and Sea Hurricanes were produced in England and Canada. The majority of Hurricanes, 9,986 were built by Hawker (who produced the type at Brooklands from December 1937 to October 1942 and at Langley Airfield, Berkshire from October 1939 to July 1944), while Hawker's sister company, the Gloster Aircraft Company, constructed 2,750. The Austin Aero Company completed 300 Hurricanes, and Canada Car and Foundry produced 1,451. Those shipped to Britain, though, were often incomplete airframes, and about 80% were delivered without an engine.

In 1939, production of 100 Hurricanes was initiated in Yugoslavia by Zmaj and Rogožarski. Of these, 20 were built by Zmaj by April 1941. Recognising that the supply of British-made Merlin engines might not be guaranteed, one of the Yugoslavian Hurricanes was fitted with a Daimler-Benz DB 601 engine, instead. This aircraft was flown in 1941. In 1938, a contract for 80 Hurricanes was placed with Fairey's Belgian subsidiary Avions Fairey SA for the Belgian Air Force, and it was intended to arm these aircraft with four 13.2 mm (0.52 in) Browning machine guns. Three were built and two flown with this armament by the time of the German invasion of Belgium in May 1940, with at least 12 more constructed by Avions Fairey armed with the conventional eight rifle-calibre machine-gun armament.

== Design ==
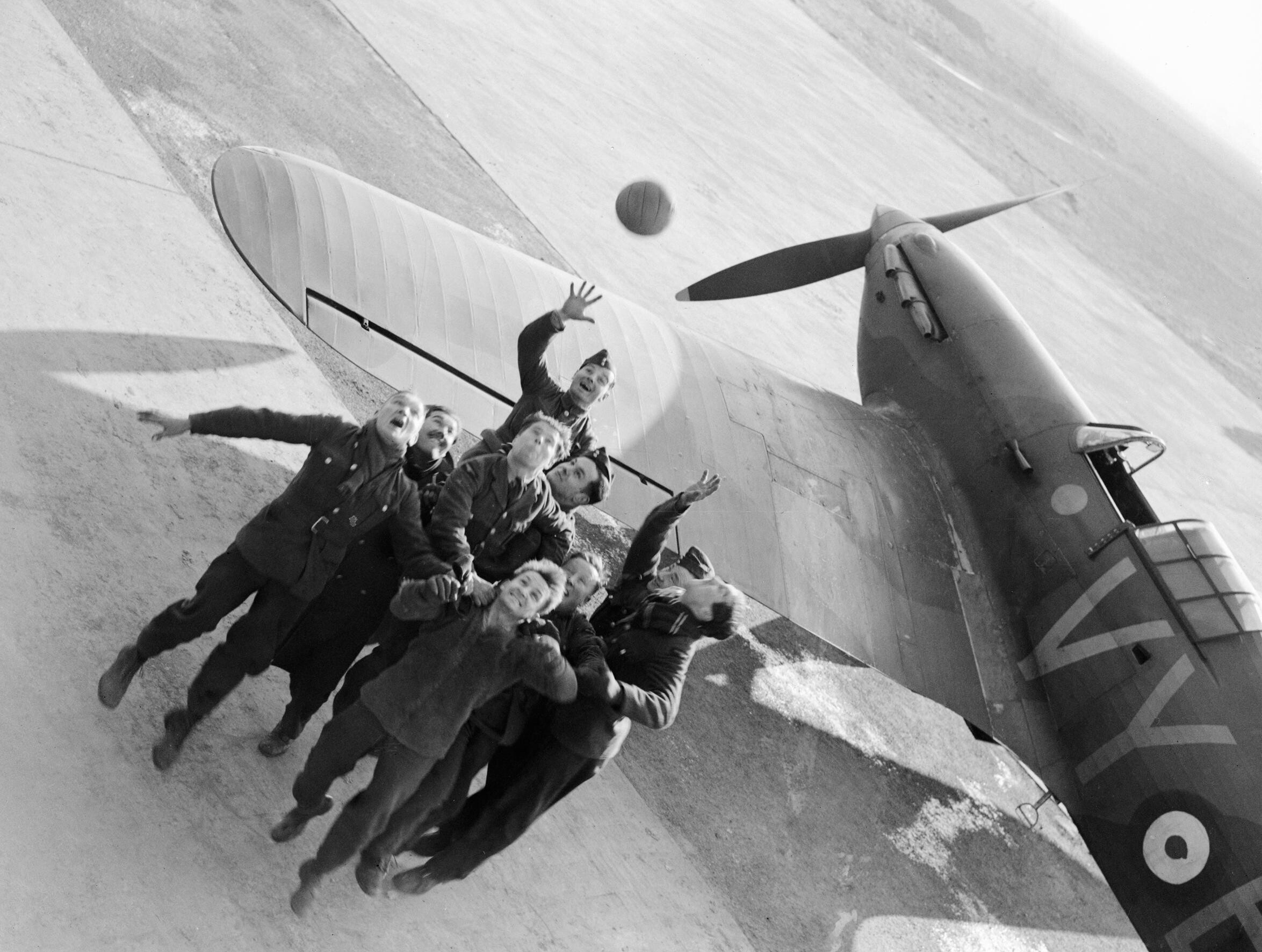
Mk.I in France, November 1939, showing original fabric-covered outer wing and two-bladed propeller

The Hawker Hurricane is a low-wing, cantilever, monoplane with retractable undercarriage and an enclosed cockpit. The primary structure of the fuselage was a Warren truss box-girder with high-tensile steel longerons and duralumin cross-bracing, which were mechanically fastened rather than being welded. Over this, a secondary structure composed of wooden formers and stringers covered with doped linen gave the fuselage a rounded section. Most of the external surfaces were linen, except for a section between the cockpit and the engine cowling, which used lightweight metal panels, instead. Camm had decided to use traditional Hawker construction techniques instead of more advanced options, such as a stressed-skin metal construction. This form of construction resembled that of earlier biplanes and was already considered to be somewhat outdated when the Hurricane was introduced to service . The Hurricane was initially armed with an arrangement of eight remotely operated, wing-mounted Browning machine guns, intended for conducting rapid engagements. The Hurricane was typically equipped for flying under both day and night conditions, being provided with navigation lights, Harley landing lights, complete blind-flying equipment, and two-way radios. Upon its entry to service, much of the performance data was intentionally concealed from the general public, but the type was known to possess a speed range of 6:1. A simple steel-tube structure supported the engine; detachable cowling panels allowed access to most of the engine's areas for maintenance. Installed underneath the fuselage, the liquid-cooled radiator has a rectangular opening to its aft; this is covered by a hinged flap, allowing the pilot to control the cooling level. An atypical feature for the era was the use of Tungum alloy pipes throughout the cooling system.

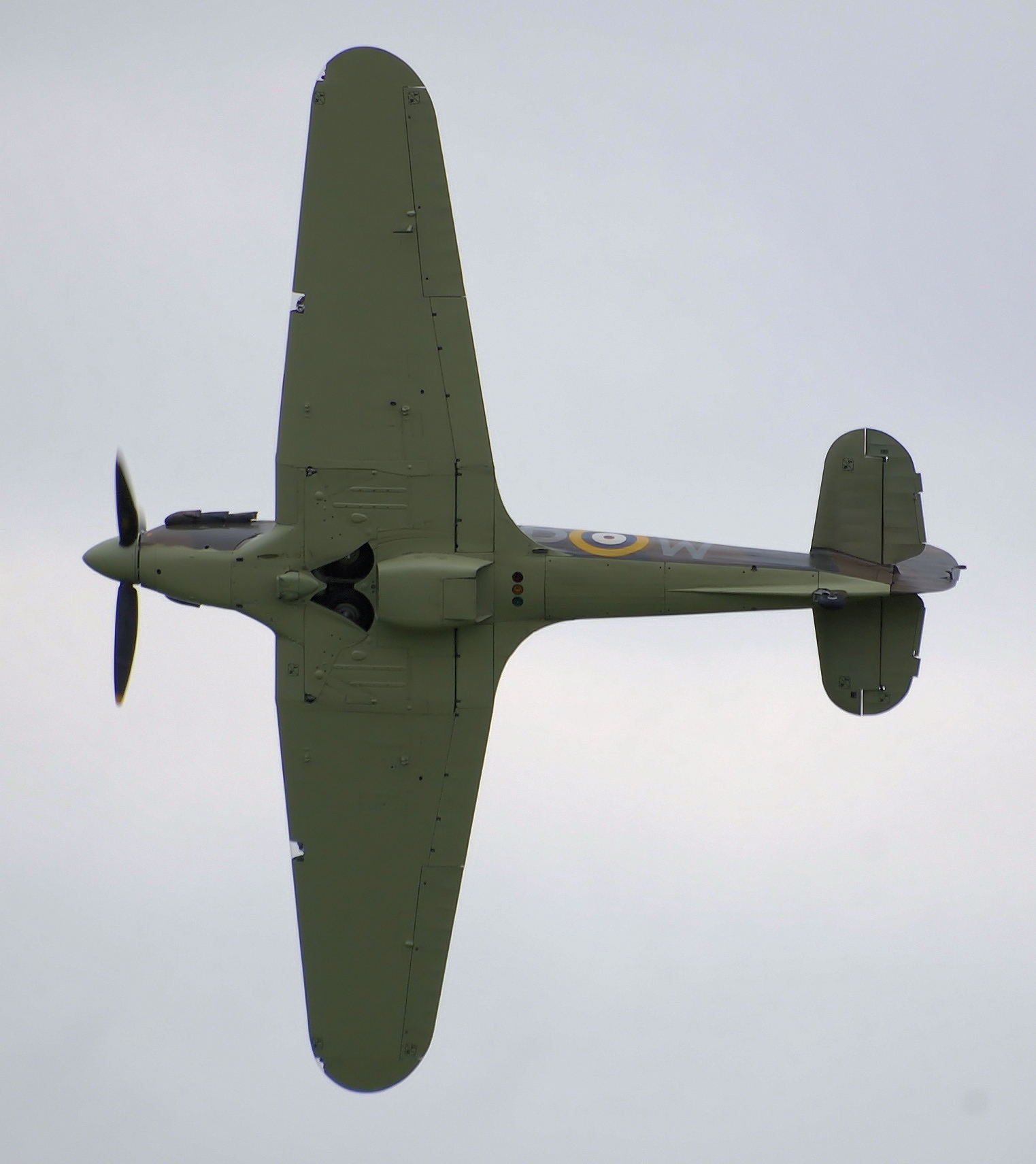
Underside view of R4118, a preserved Hurricane from the Battle of Britain

Initially, the structure of the Hurricane's cantilever wing consisted of two steel spars, which possessed considerable strength and stiffness. The wing was described by Flight as relatively straightforward to manufacture, employing simple vertical jigs to attach the two spars, after which the wing ribs were installed using horizontal bolts, forming separate units between the front and rear spars. Hydraulically actuated split trailing-edge flaps were fitted to the inner end of the wings. This wing was predominantly fabric-covered, like the fuselage, although some lightweight metal sheets were used on the inner wing and its leading edge. The majority of the flight control surfaces, such as the Frise-type ailerons, also had fabric coverings.

An all-metal, stressed-skin wing of duraluminium (a DERD specification similar to AA2024) was introduced in April 1939 and was used for all of the later marks. "The metal-skinned wings allowed a diving speed that was 80 mph (130 km/h) higher than the fabric-covered ones. They were very different in construction but were interchangeable with the fabric-covered wings; one trials Hurricane, L1877, was even flown with a fabric-covered port wing and metal-covered starboard wing. The great advantage of the metal-covered wings over the fabric ones was that the metal ones could carry far greater stress loads without needing as much structure." Several fabric-wing Hurricanes were still in service during the Battle of Britain, although a good number had had their wings replaced during servicing or after repair. Changing the wings required only three hours' work per aircraft.

The Hurricane had an inward-retracting undercarriage, the main undercarriage units being housed in recesses in the wing. Hinged, telescopic, Vickers-built legs are attached to the bottom boom of the wing's forward spar, but with an angled pivot to allow the strut to be perpendicular to the thrust line when extended and angle rearwards when retracted to clear the forward spar. A hydraulic jack actuated the undercarriage. Two separate hydraulic systems, one being power-operated and the other hand-operated, are present for the deployment and retraction of the undercarriage; in the event of both failing, pilots can release the retaining catches holding the undercarriage in place, deploying the wheels to the down position using weight alone. A wide wheel-track was used to allow for considerable stability during ground movements and to enable tight turns to be performed.

The prototype and early production Hurricanes were fitted with a Watts two-bladed, fixed-pitch, wooden propeller. Flight commented of this arrangement: "Many have expressed surprise that the Hurricane is not fitted with variable-pitch airscrews". The original two-bladed propeller was found to be inefficient at low airspeeds, and the aircraft required a long ground run to get airborne, which caused concern at Fighter Command. Accordingly, trials with a de Havilland variable-pitch propeller demonstrated a reduction in the Hurricane's take-off run from 1,230 to 750 ft (370 to 230 m). Deliveries of these began in April 1939; this was later replaced by the hydraulically operated, constant-speed Rotol propeller, which came into service in time for the Battle of Britain.

Then, with tail trimmer set, throttle and mixture lever fully forward... and puffs of grey exhaust smoke soon clearing at maximum r.p.m. came the surprise! There was no sudden surge of acceleration, but with a thunderous roar from the exhausts just ahead on either side of the windscreen, only a steady increase in speed... In retrospect that first Hurricane sortie was a moment of elation, but also of relief. Apart from the new scale of speeds that the pilot had to adapt to, the Hurricane had all the qualities of its stable, secure biplane predecessor the Hart, but enhanced by livelier controls, greater precision and all this performance.

— Roland Beamont describing his first flight in a Hurricane as a trainee pilot.

Camm's priority was to provide the pilot with good all-round visibility. To this end, the cockpit was mounted reasonably high in the fuselage, creating a distinctive "hump-backed" silhouette. Pilot access to the cockpit was aided by a retractable "stirrup" mounted below the trailing edge of the port wing. This was linked to a spring-loaded, hinged flap, which covered a handhold on the fuselage, just behind the cockpit. When the flap was shut, the footstep retracted into the fuselage. In addition, both wing roots were coated with strips of nonslip material.

An advantage of the steel-tube structure was that cannon shells could pass right through the wood and fabric covering without exploding. Even if one of the steel tubes were damaged, the repair work required was relatively simple and could be done by ground crew at the airfield. Damage to a stressed-skin structure, as used by the Spitfire, required more specialised equipment to repair. The old-fashioned structure also permitted the assembly of Hurricanes with relatively basic equipment under field conditions. Crated Hurricanes were assembled at Takoradi in West Africa and flown across the Sahara to the Middle East theatre, and to save space, some Royal Navy aircraft carriers carried their reserve Sea Hurricanes dismantled into their major assemblies, which were slung up on the hangar bulkheads and deckhead for reassembly when needed.

In contrast, the contemporary Spitfire used all-metal monocoque construction, thus was both lighter and stronger, though less tolerant of bullet damage. With its ease of maintenance, widely set landing gear, and benign flying characteristics, the Hurricane remained in use in theatres of operations where reliability, easy handling, and a stable gun platform were more important than performance, typically in roles such as ground attack. One of the design requirements of the original specification was that both the Hurricane and the Spitfire were also to be used as night fighters. The Hurricane proved to be a relatively simple aircraft to fly at night, and they shot down several German aircraft on night raids. From early 1941, the Hurricane was also used as an "intruder" aircraft, patrolling German airfields in France at night to catch bombers taking off or landing.

== Operational history ==
=== Pre-war ===
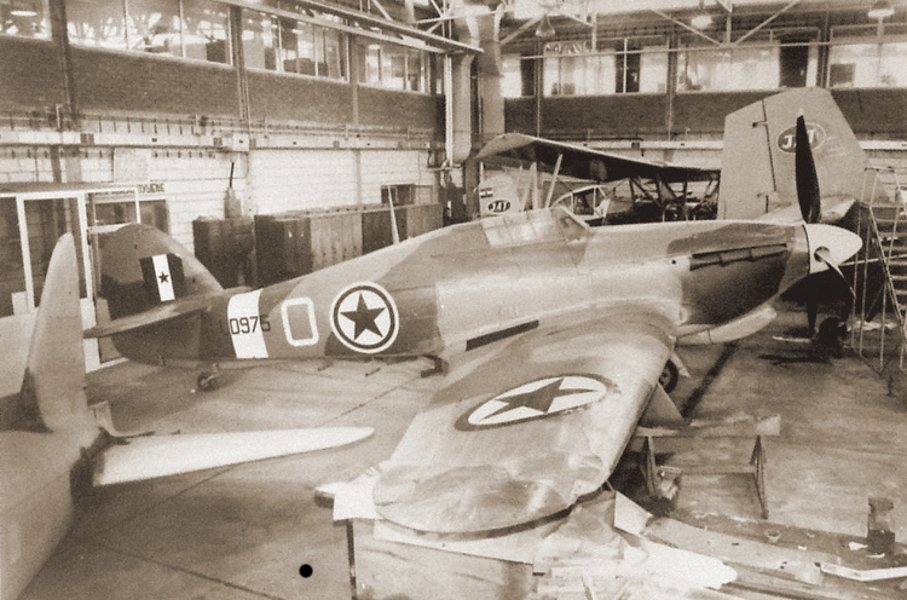
Yugoslavian Hurricane Mk. IV

By the middle of 1938, the first 50 Hurricanes had reached squadrons, and at that time, the rate of production had been assessed to be slightly greater than the RAF's capacity to introduce the new aircraft, which had already been accelerated. Accordingly, the British government gave Hawker the clearance to sell excess aircraft to nations that were likely to oppose German expansion. As a result, some modest export sales were made to other countries; at the earliest opportunity, a former RAF Hurricane I was dispatched to Yugoslavia for evaluation purposes. Shortly after this evaluation, an order for 24 Hurricane Mk.Is for the Royal Yugoslav Air Force was received; this was followed by the purchase of a production licence for the Hurricane by Yugoslavia. Yugoslavian Hurricanes saw action against the Luftwaffe during the invasion of Yugoslavia in 1941 by the Axis powers.

To the end of August 1939, 14 Hurricanes had been sent to Poland (SS Lassel left Liverpool on 30 August 1939 heading to Constanza in Romania, but these planes never reached Poland and ultimately were sold to Turkey), seven ex-RAF Hurricanes had been sent to South Africa, while another 13 ex-RAF Hurricanes were sent to Turkey, 13 Hurricanes had been built for Belgium, 21 for Canada including one as a pattern for Canadian Car and Foundry, one for Iran, one for Poland, three for Romania, and 12 for Yugoslavia. All the built-for-export aircraft were taken from the RAF order, so all originally had an RAF serial number. Further exports were done in late 1939 and early 1940.

Hurricane production was increased as part of a plan to create a reserve of attrition aircraft, as well as re-equip existing squadrons and newly formed ones such as those of the Auxiliary Air Force. Expansion scheme E included a target of 500 fighters of all types by the start of 1938. By the time of the Munich Crisis, only two fully operational RAF squadrons of the planned 12 were equipped with Hurricanes. By the time of the German invasion of Poland, 16 Hurricane squadrons were operational, and a further two were in the process of converting.

=== Phoney War ===
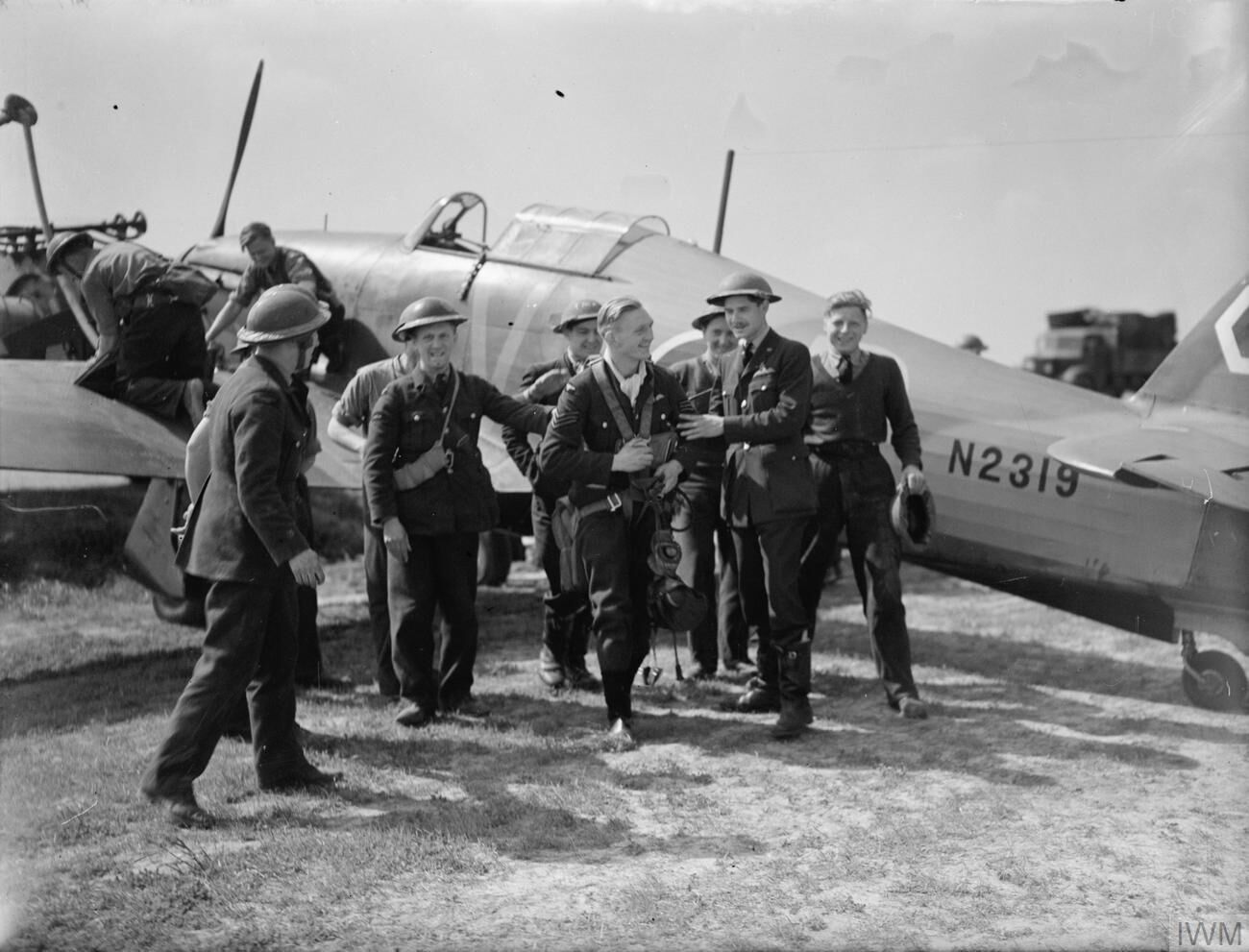
Personnel of 85 Squadron next to a Hurricane I, Lille, Seclin, France, on 10 May 1940

On 24 August 1939, the British government gave orders partially to mobilise and No. 1 Group RAF (Air Vice-Marshal Patrick Playfair) sent its 10 Fairey Battle day-bomber squadrons to France, according to plans established by the British and French earlier in the year. The group was the first echelon of the RAF Advanced Air Striking Force (AASF) and flew from bases at Abingdon, Harwell, Benson, Boscombe Down, and Bicester. The group HQ became the AASF when the order to move to France was received at the home station HQs, 71, 72 74–76 Wings.

In response to a request from the French government for the provision of 10 fighter squadrons to provide air support, Air Chief Marshal Sir Hugh Dowding, commander-in-chief of RAF Fighter Command, insisted that this number would deplete British defences severely, so initially only four squadrons of Hurricanes, 1, 73, 85, and 87, were relocated to France, keeping Spitfires back for "Home" defence. The first to arrive was 73 Squadron on 10 September 1939, followed shortly by the other three. A little later, 607 and 615 Squadrons joined them.

Owing to the Hurricane's rugged construction, ease of maintenance and repair in the field, and docile landing and take-off characteristics, coupled with a wide-track undercarriage, it was selected to go to France as the principal RAF fighter. Two Hurricane squadrons, No. 1 and No. 73, formed 67 Wing of the Advanced Air Striking Force (No. 1 to Berry-au-Bac, north-west of Paris; No. 73 to Rouvres) while two more, No. 85 and No. 87, formed 60 Wing of the Air Component, BEF.

While the two squadrons of No. 60 Wing had their Hurricanes painted in the standard colour scheme and markings of Home-based fighters, those of No. 67 Wing differed considerably, probably because No. 1 and No. 73 Squadrons were operating in close proximity to French fighter squadrons. Hence these units painted red, white, and blue stripes over the entire height of the rudders on their Hurricanes in a similar manner to the standard French AF National markings.

As the French squadrons were not familiar with the British use of code letters, and causes for error in aircraft identification could have occurred, both Hurricane squadrons removed their squadron identification letters, leaving the grey-painted aircraft letter aft of the fuselage roundel. The decision to adopt these special changes in markings seems to have been made at 67 Group HQ (the immediate command authority for the two squadrons involved) to suit local circumstances.

The Hurricane had its first combat action on 21 October 1939, at the start of the Phoney War. That day, "A" Flight of 46 Squadron took off from North Coates satellite airfield, on the Lincolnshire coast, and was directed to intercept a formation of nine Heinkel He 115B floatplanes from 1/KüFlGr 906, searching for ships to attack in the North Sea. The Heinkels, which were flying at sea level in an attempt to avoid fighter attacks, had already been attacked and damaged by two Spitfires from 72 Squadron, when six Hurricanes intercepted them. The Hurricanes shot down four of the enemy in rapid succession, 46 Squadron claiming five and the Spitfire pilots two.

After his first flight in October 1939, Hurricane pilot Roland Beamont subsequently flew operationally with 87 Squadron, claiming three enemy aircraft during the French campaign, and delivered great praise for his aircraft's performance:

Throughout the bad days of 1940, 87 Squadron had maintained a proficient formation aerobatic team, the precise flying controls and responsive engines permitting precision formation through loops, barrel rolls, 1 g semistall turns and rolls off half-loops ... My Hurricane was never hit in the Battles of France and Britain, and in over 700 hr on type I never experienced an engine failure.

— Roland Beamont, summarising his wartime experience as a pilot.

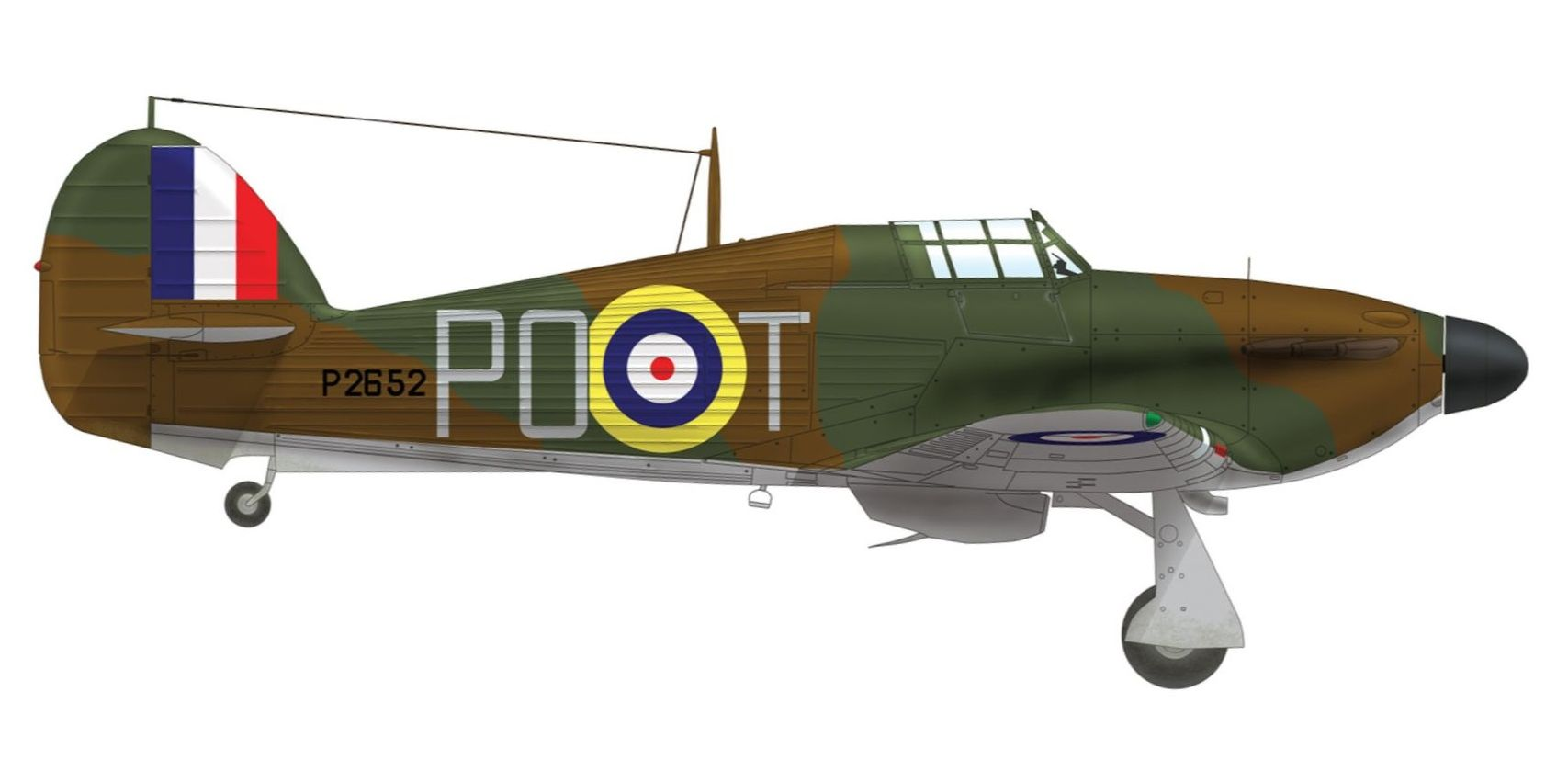
Hurricane Mk.I of the 46 Squadron during the Norwegian campaign, May 1940. This aircraft was abandoned in Norway.

While the opening months of the war were characterised by little air activity in general, sporadic engagements and aerial skirmishes happened between the two sides. On 30 October 1939 Hurricanes saw action over France. That day, Pilot Officer P. W. O. "Boy" Mould of 1 Squadron, flying Hurricane L1842, shot down a Dornier Do 17P from 2(F)/123. The German aircraft, sent to photograph Allied airfields close to the border, fell in flames about 10 mi (16 km) west of Toul. Mould was the first RAF pilot to down an enemy aircraft on the European continent in the Second World War. According to Mason, the experiences gained in these early engagements proved invaluable in developing tactics that became tried and tested and rapidly spread throughout Fighter Command.

On 6 November 1939, Pilot Officer Peter Ayerst from 73 Squadron was the first to clash with a Messerschmitt Bf 109. After the dogfight, he came back with five holes in his fuselage. Flying Officer Cobber Kain, a New Zealander, was responsible for 73 Squadron's first victory, on 8 November 1939 while stationed at Rouvres. He went on to become one of the RAF's first fighter aces of the war, being credited with 16 kills. On 22 December, the Hurricanes in France suffered their first losses, three, while trying to intercept an unidentified aircraft between Metz and Thionville; they were jumped by four Bf 109Es from III./JG 53, with their Gruppenkommandeur, Spanish Civil War ace Captain Werner Mölders, in the lead. Mölders and Leutnant Hans von Hahn shot down the Hurricanes of Sergeant R. M. Perry and J. Winn for no loss.

=== Battle of France ===
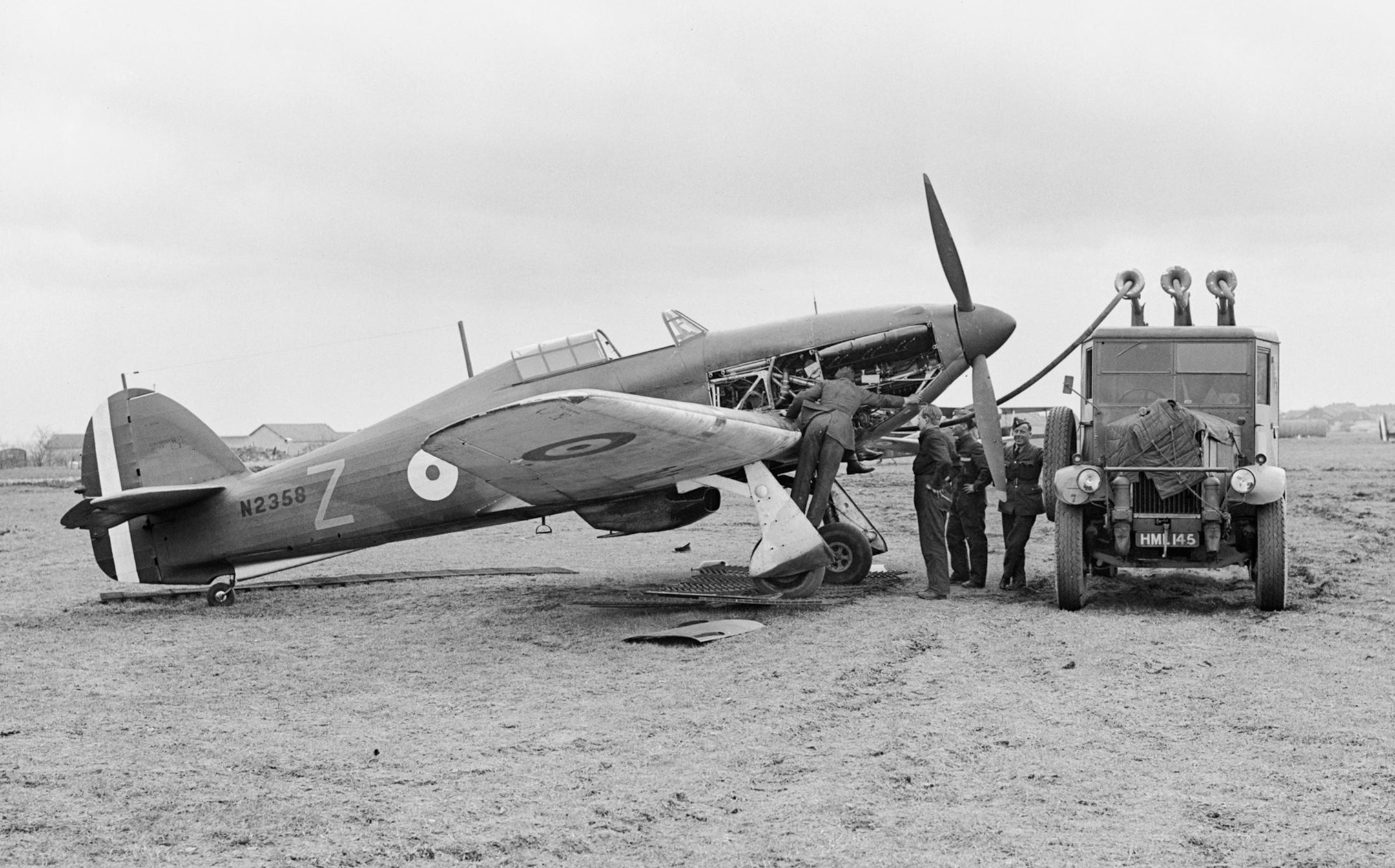
Hurricane I of 1 Squadron being refuelled at Vassincourt, France

In May 1940, Nos. 3, 79, and 504 Squadrons reinforced the earlier units as Germany's Blitzkrieg gathered momentum. On 10 May, the first day of the Battle of France, Flight Lieutenant R. E. Lovett and Flying Officer "Fanny" Orton, of 73 Squadron, were the first RAF pilots to engage enemy aircraft in the campaign. They attacked one of three Dornier Do 17s from 4. Staffel/KG 2 that were flying over their airfield at Rouvres-en-Woevre. The Dornier went away unscathed, while Orton was hit by defensive fire and had to force land. On the same day, the Hurricane squadrons claimed 42 German aircraft, none of them fighters, shot down during 208 sorties; seven Hurricanes were lost, but no pilots were killed.

On 12 May, several Hurricane units were committed to escort bombers. That morning, five Fairey Battle volunteer crews from 12 Squadron took off from Amifontaine base to bomb Vroenhoven and Veldwezelt bridges on the Meuse, at Maastricht. The escort consisted of eight Hurricanes of 1 Squadron, with Squadron Leader P. J. H. "Bull" Halahan in the lead. When the formation approached Maastricht, it was bounced by 16 Bf 109Es from 2./JG 27. Two Battles and two Hurricanes (including Halahan's) were shot down, two more Battles were brought down by flak, and the fifth bomber had to crash-land. The 1 Squadron pilots claimed four Messerschmitts and two Heinkel He 112s, (Note: The Heinkel He 112 was never operational in France.) while the Luftwaffe actually lost only one Bf 109.

On 13 May 1940, a further 32 Hurricanes arrived. All 10 requested Hurricane squadrons were then operating from French soil and felt the full force of the Nazi offensive. The following day, Hurricanes suffered heavy losses; 27 were shot down, 22 by Messerschmitts, with 15 pilots killed (another died some days later), including Squadron Leader J. B. Parnall (504 Squadron), (Note: J. B. Parnall was the first RAF flight commander to be killed in action during the war.) and the Australian ace Flying Officer Les Clisby (1 Squadron). (Note: Australian ace Les Clisby was credited with 16 individual air victories, one shared and one not confirmed. Postwar research reduced his score to nine individual kills and three shared. According to some sources, he was killed on 15 May 1940.) On the same day, 3 Squadron claimed 17 German aircraft shot down, 85 and 87 Squadrons together claimed four victories, while 607 Squadron claimed nine. During the following three days (15–17 May), no fewer than 51 Hurricanes were lost, in combat or in accidents.

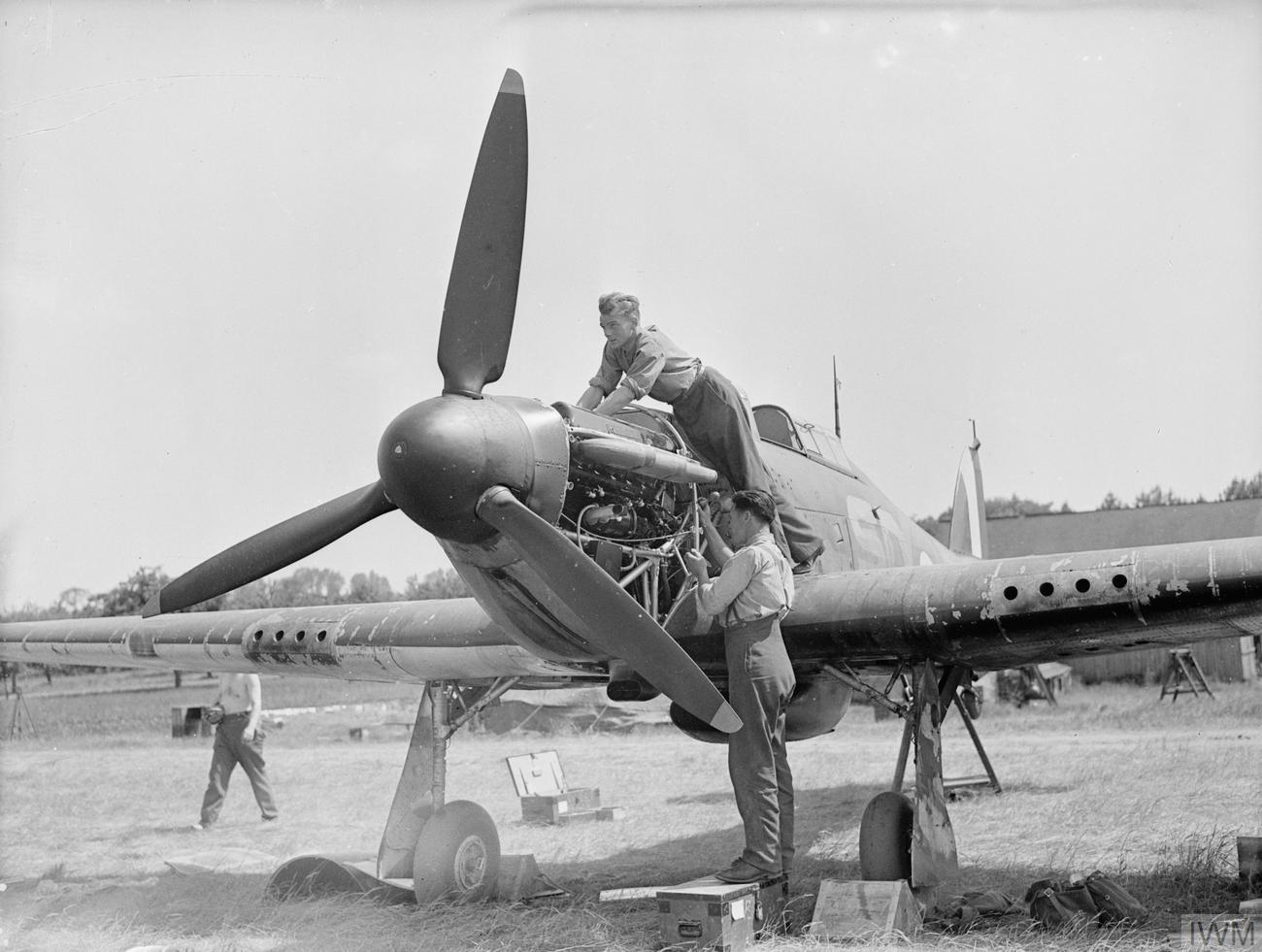
Mechanics servicing the engine of a Hurricane I of 501 Squadron at No. 1 Repair Centre, Reims, Champagne, France

By 17 May, the end of the first week of fighting, only three of the squadrons were near operational strength, but the Hurricanes had managed to destroy nearly twice as many German aircraft. On 18 May 1940, air combat continued from dawn to dusk; Hurricane pilots claimed 57 German aircraft and 20 probables (Luftwaffe records show 39 aircraft lost). The following day, 1 and 73 Squadrons claimed 11 German aircraft (three by "Cobber" Kain and three by Paul Richey). On these two days Hurricanes suffered heavier losses, with 68 Hurricanes shot down or forced to crash-land due to combat damage. Fifteen pilots were killed, eight were taken prisoner, and 11 injured. Two-thirds of the Hurricanes had been shot down by Messerschmitt Bf 109s and Bf 110s.

In the afternoon of 20 May 1940, the Hurricane units based in northern France were ordered to abandon their bases on the continent and return to Great Britain. On the same day, "Bull" Halahan requested the repatriation of the pilots serving in 1 Squadron. During the previous 10 days, the unit had been the most successful of the campaign; it had claimed 63 victories for the loss of five pilots, two killed, one taken prisoner, and two hospitalised. 1 Squadron was awarded 10 DFCs and three DFMs during the Blitzkrieg. On the evening of 21 May, the only Hurricanes still operational were those of the AASF that had been moved to bases around Troyes.

During the 11 days of fighting in France and over Dunkirk from 10 to 21 May, Hurricane pilots claimed 499 kills and 123 probables. Contemporary German records, examined postwar, attribute 299 Luftwaffe aircraft destroyed and 65 seriously damaged by RAF fighters. The last 66 Hurricanes of the 452 engaged during the Battle of France left France on 21 June; 178 were abandoned at several airfields, notably Merville, Abbeville, and Lille/Seclin.

=== Operation Dynamo ===
During Operation Dynamo (the evacuation from Dunkirk of British, French, and Belgian troops cut off by the German army during the Battle of Dunkirk), the Hawker Hurricanes operated from British bases. Between 26 May and 3 June 1940, the 14 Hurricane units involved were credited with 108 air victories. A total of 27 Hurricane pilots became aces during Operation Dynamo, led by Canadian Pilot Officer W. L. Willie McKnight (10 victories) and Pilot Officer Percival Stanley Turner (seven victories), who served in No. 242 Squadron, consisting mostly of Canadian personnel. Losses were 22 pilots killed and three captured.

Over Dunkirk, the Luftwaffe suffered its first serious rebuff of the war. As Galland has noted, the nature and style of the air battles over the beaches should have provided a warning as to the inherent weaknesses of the Luftwaffe's force structure. ...[T]he Bf 109 was at the outer limits of its range and possessed less flying time over Dunkirk than did the "Hurricanes" and "Spitfires" operating from southern England. German bombers were still located in western Germany and had even farther to fly. Thus, the Luftwaffe could not bring its full weight to bear so that when its bombers hammered those on the beaches or embarking, the RAF intervened in a significant fashion. German aircraft losses were high, and British fighter attacks often prevented German bombers from performing with full effectiveness. Both sides suffered heavy losses. During the nine days from May 26 through June 3, the RAF lost 177 aircraft destroyed or damaged; the Germans lost 240. For much of the Luftwaffe, Dunkirk came as a nasty shock. Fliegerkorps II reported in its war diary that it lost more aircraft on the 27th attacking the evacuation than it had lost in the previous 10 days of the campaign.

— Murray. Strategy for Defeat: The Luftwaffe 1935–1945

On 27 May 1940, in one of the final mass encounters of the Blitzkrieg, 13 Hurricanes from 501 Squadron intercepted 24 Heinkel He 111s escorted by 20 Bf 110s; during the ensuing battle, 11 Heinkels were claimed as "kills" and others damaged, with little damage to the Hurricanes. On 7 June 1940, "Cobber" Kain, the first RAF ace of the war, got word that he was to return to England for "rest leave" at an Operational Training Unit. On leaving his airfield, he put on an impromptu aerobatic display and was killed when his Hurricane crashed after completing a loop and attempting some low-altitude "flick" rolls.

Initial engagements with the Luftwaffe showed the Hurricane to be a tight-turning and steady platform, but the Watts two-bladed propeller was clearly unsuitable. At least one pilot complained of how a Heinkel 111 was able to pull away from him in a chase, yet by this time, the Heinkel was obsolete. At the start of the war, the engine ran on standard 87 octane aviation spirit. From early 1940, increasing quantities of 100 octane fuel imported from the U.S. became available. In February 1940, Hurricanes with the Merlin II and III engines began to receive modifications to allow for an additional 6 psi (41 kPa) of supercharger boost for five minutes (although accounts were made of its use for 30 minutes continuously).

The extra supercharger boost, which increased engine output by nearly 250 hp (190 kW), gave the Hurricane an approximate increase in speed of 25 to 35 mph (40 to 56 km/h), under 15,000 ft (4,600 m) altitude and greatly increased the aircraft's climb rate. "Overboost" or "pulling the plug", a form of war emergency power as it was called in later Second World War aircraft, was an important wartime modification that allowed the Hurricane to be more competitive against the Bf 109E and to increase its margin of superiority over the Bf 110C, especially at low altitude. With the +12 psi (83 kPa) "emergency boost", the Merlin III was able to generate 1,310 hp (980 kW) at 9,000 ft (2,700 m).

Flight Lieutenant Ian Gleed of 87 Squadron wrote about the effect of using the extra boost on the Hurricane while chasing a Bf 109 at low altitude on 19 May 1940: "Damn! We're flat out as it is. Here goes with the tit. (Note: This was the pilot's term for the Boost Cut-Out Control which was adjacent to the throttle lever.) A jerk – boost's shot up to 12 pounds; speed's increased by 30 mph. I'm gaining ground – 700, 600, 500 yards. Give him a burst. No, hold your fire you fool! He hasn't seen you yet..." Gleed ran out of ammunition before he could shoot the 109 down, although he left it heavily damaged and flying at about 50 ft (15 m). (Note: Gleed rose through the ranks to become a wing commander flying Spitfire VBs over North Africa; he was shot down and killed by Oberleutnant Ernst-Wilhelm Reinert on 16 April 1943. Gleed was credited with 15 victories.)

Hurricanes equipped with Rotol constant-speed propellers were delivered to RAF squadrons in May 1940, with deliveries continuing throughout the Battle of Britain. According to aviation author David Donald, the Rotol propeller had the effect of transforming the Hurricane's performance from "disappointing" to "acceptable mediocrity"; modified aircraft were reportedly much sought after among squadrons which had also been equipped with Hurricanes that were fitted with the older de Havilland two-position propeller.

=== Battle of Britain ===
At the end of June 1940, following the fall of France, 31 of Fighter Command's 61 fighter squadrons were equipped with Hurricanes. The Battle of Britain officially lasted from 10 July until 31 October 1940, but the heaviest fighting took place between 8 August and 21 September. Both the Supermarine Spitfire and the Hurricane are renowned for their part in having defended Britain against the Luftwaffe; generally, the Spitfires intercepted the German fighters, leaving Hurricanes to concentrate on the bombers, and despite the undoubted abilities of the "thoroughbred" Spitfire, the "workhorse" Hurricane scored the higher number of RAF victories during this period, accounting for 55% of the 2,739 German losses, according to Fighter Command, compared with 42% by Spitfires. On 8 August 1940, Hurricanes of No. 145 Squadron were recorded as having fired the first shots of the Battle of Britain. The highest-scoring Hurricane squadron during the Battle of Britain was the No. 303 Polish Fighter Squadron, which also had the distinction of having the highest ratio of enemy aircraft destroyed to own losses suffered.

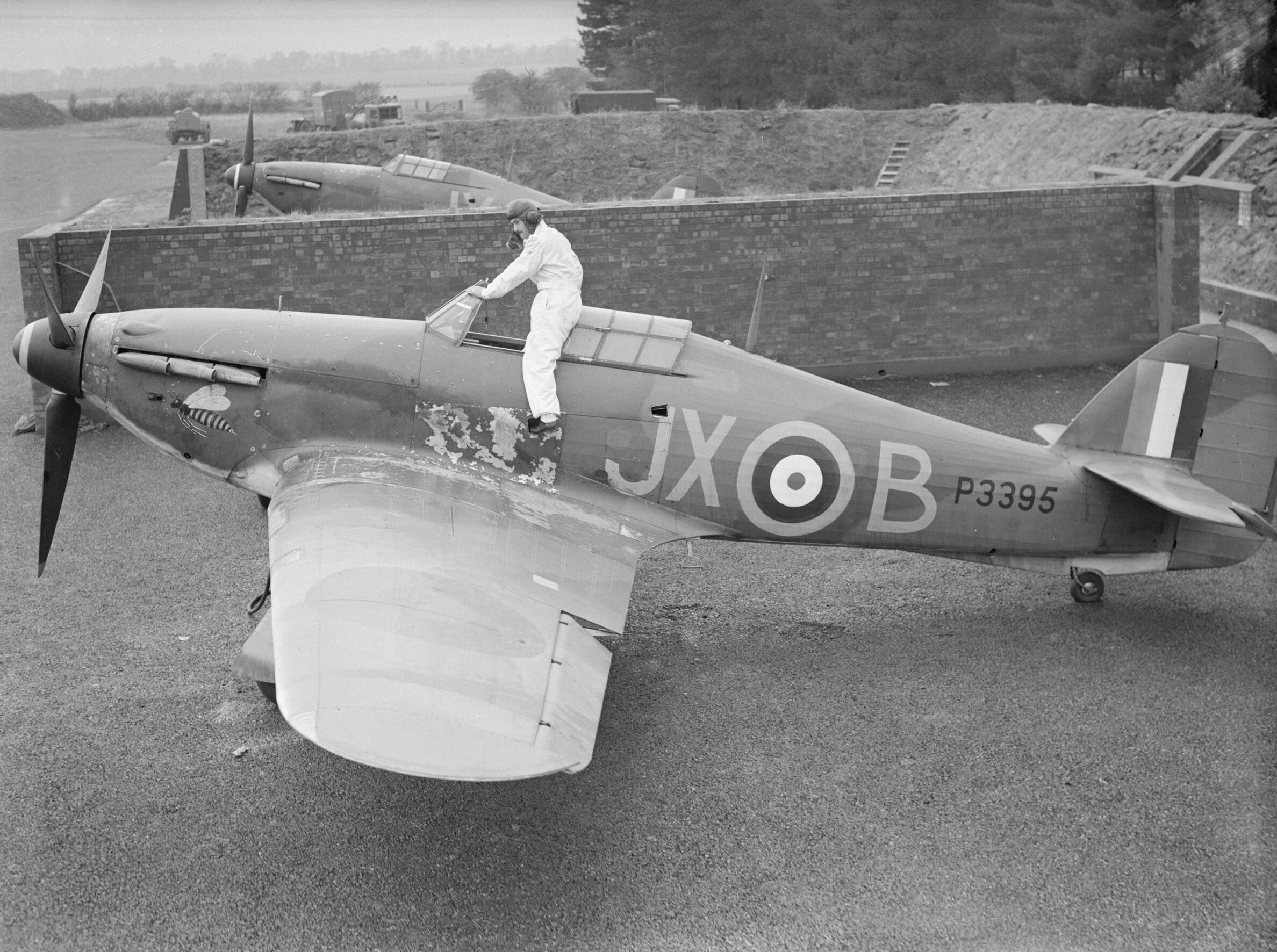
Hurricane I of 1 Squadron flown by Plt Off A.V. Clowes

Another thing we did was to devise a manoeuvre which was aimed at getting us out of a difficult corner if we ever got into one. This may sound very extraordinary, probably, to practising pilots today, but it consisted of putting everything into the left hand front corner of the cockpit. If you saw a 109 on your tail, and it hadn't shot you down at that point, you put on full throttle, fine pitch, full left rudder, full left stick and full forward stick. This resulted in a horrible manoeuvre which was, in fact, a negative g spiral dive. But you would come out of the bottom with no 109 on your tail and your aeroplane intact.

— Roland Beamont describing how a Hurricane can get away from a Bf 109.

As a fighter, the Hurricane had some drawbacks. It was slightly slower than both the Spitfire I and II and the Messerschmitt Bf 109E, and the thicker wing profiles compromised acceleration, but it could out-turn both of them. In spite of its performance deficiencies against the Bf 109, the Hurricane was still capable of destroying the German fighter, especially at lower altitudes. The standard tactic of the 109s was to attempt to climb higher than the RAF fighters and "bounce" them in a dive; the Hurricanes could evade such tactics by turning into the attack or going into a "corkscrew dive", which the 109s, with their lower rate of roll, found hard to counter. If a 109 were caught in a dogfight, the Hurricane was just as capable of out-turning the 109 as the Spitfire. In a stern chase, the 109 could evade the Hurricane.

In September 1940, the more powerful Mk.IIa series 1 Hurricanes started entering service, although only in small numbers. This version was capable of a maximum speed of 342 mph (550 km/h). The Hurricane was a steady gun platform and had demonstrated its ruggedness, as several were badly damaged yet returned to base. The Hurricane's construction made it dangerous if it caught fire; the wood frames and fabric covering of the rear fuselage allowed fire to spread through the rear fuselage structure easily. The gravity fuel tank in the forward fuselage sat right in front of the instrument panel, without any form of protection for the pilot. Many Hurricane pilots were seriously burned as a consequence of a jet of flame that could burn through the instrument panel. This became of such concern to Hugh Dowding that he had Hawker retrofit the fuselage tanks of the Hurricanes with Linatex, a self-expanding rubber coating. If the tank happened to be punctured by a bullet, the Linatex coating expanded when soaked with petrol and sealed it. However, some Hurricane pilots felt that the fuel tanks in the wings, although they were also protected with a layer of Linatex, were vulnerable from behind, and those, and not the fuselage tank, were thought to be the main fire risk.

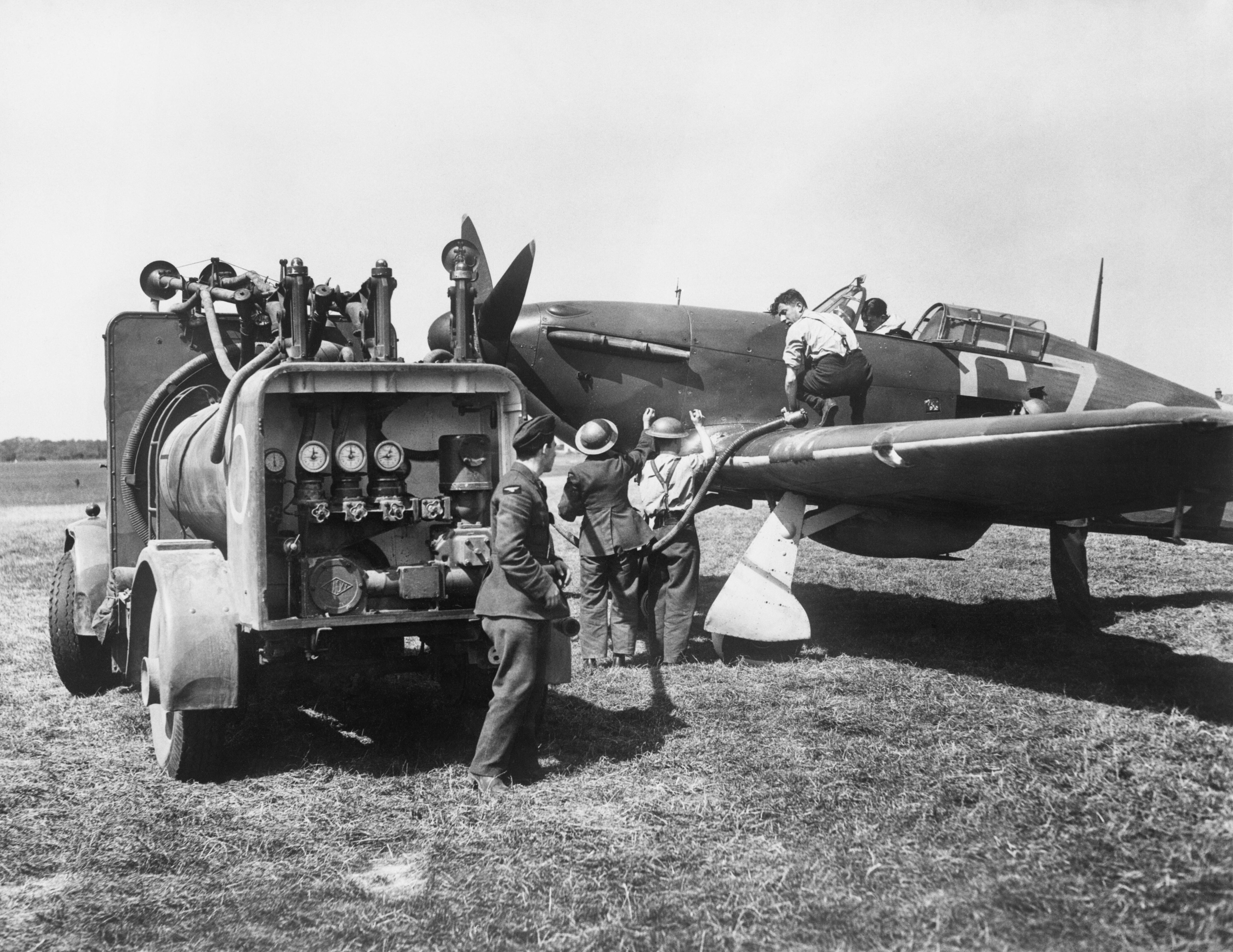
Groundcrew refuelling a Hurricane Mk.I of 32 Squadron, RAF Biggin Hill, Bromley, London, August 1940

From 10 July to 11 August 1940, RAF fighters fired at 114 German bombers and shot down 80, a destruction ratio of 70%. Against the Bf 109, the RAF fighters attacked 70 and shot down 54 of these, a ratio of 77%. Part of the success of the British fighters possibly was due to the use of the de Wilde incendiary round. The Hurricane with the highest number of kills during the Battle of Britain was P3308, a Mk.I, flown between 15 August and 7 October 1940 by RAF (auxiliary) pilot Archie McKellar of 605 Squadron. He is credited with 21 kills, 19 of those in a Hurricane during the Battle of Britain. On 7 October, he is credited with shooting down five Bf 109s, making him one of only two RAF pilots (the other being Brian Carbury of New Zealand) to become an "ace in a day" during the Battle of Britain. During his brief fighting career, McKellar earned the DSO, DFC & Bar. McKellar has remained in relative obscurity in Battle of Britain history, as he was killed in action one day after the date set by the War Ministry (after the war) as the official end date for the Battle of Britain. He died on 1 November 1940 while taking on a superior number of Bf 109s.

As in the Spitfire, the Merlin engine suffered from negative-g cut-out, a problem not cured until the introduction of Miss Shilling's orifice in early 1941.

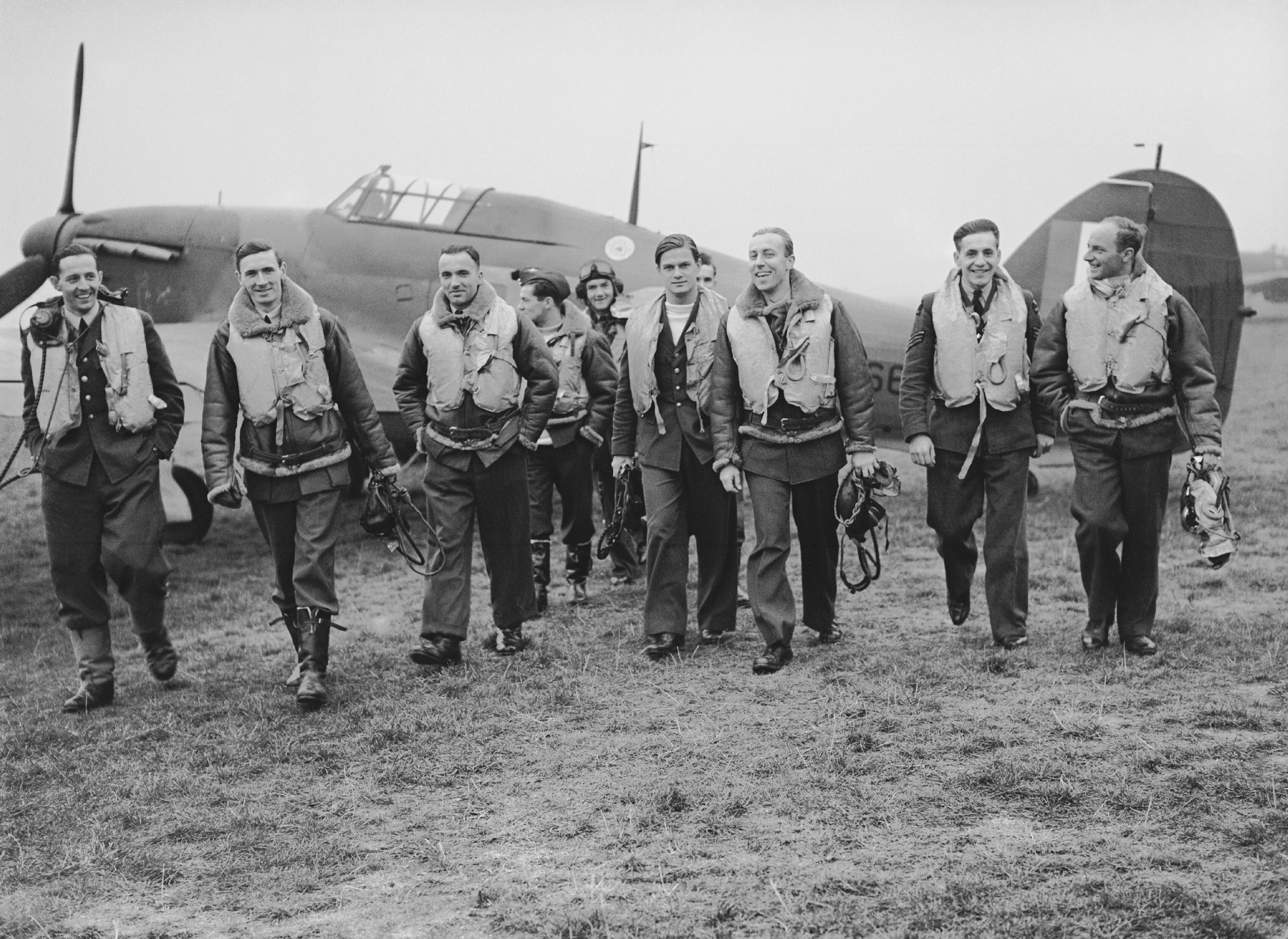
303 squadron pilots. L-R: F/O Ferić, F/Lt Lt Kent, F/O Grzeszczak, P/O Radomski, P/O Zumbach, P/O Łokuciewski, F/O Henneberg, Sgt Rogowski, Sgt Szaposznikow (in 1940).

The only Battle of Britain Victoria Cross, and the only one awarded to a member of Fighter Command during the war, was awarded to Flight Lieutenant James Brindley Nicolson of 249 Squadron as a result of an action on 16 August 1940, when his section of three Hurricanes was "bounced" from above by Bf 110 fighters. All three were hit simultaneously. Nicolson was badly wounded, and his Hurricane was damaged and engulfed in flames. While attempting to leave the cockpit, Nicolson noticed that one of the Bf 110s had overshot his aircraft. He returned to the cockpit, which by now was in an inferno, engaged the enemy, and may have shot down the Bf 110. (Note: As far as can be determined, no Messerschmitt Bf 110 crashes on land for 16 August 1940 could be attributed to Nicolson, although Nicolson himself believed the 110 crashed into the sea.) Afterward, he parachuted to safety, although he was mistakenly shot at by the Home Guard after landing.

=== Night fighters and intruders ===
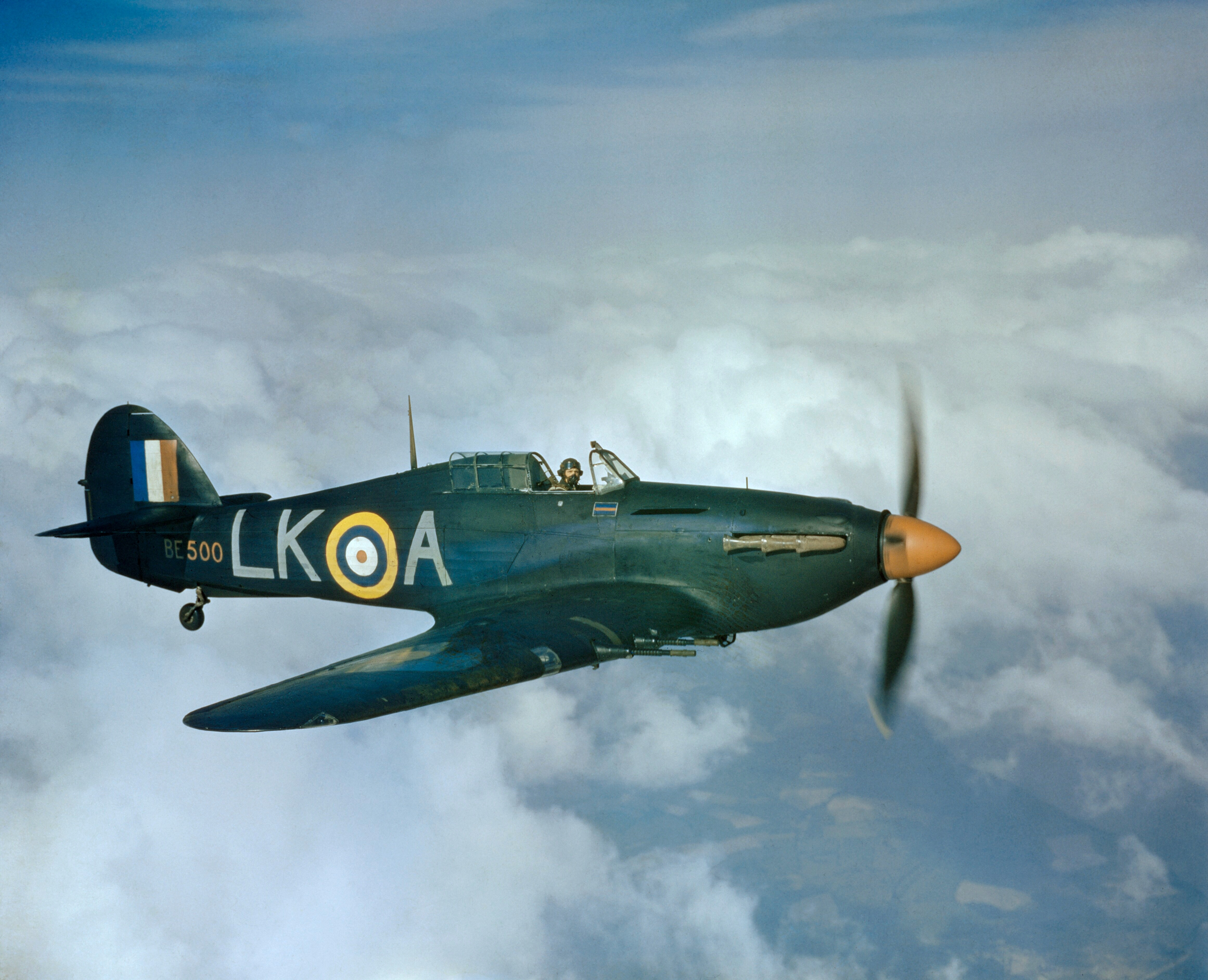
Wartime colour photo of Hurricane IIC BE500 flown by Sqn Ldr Denis Smallwood of 87 Squadron in the RDM2 ("Special Night") scheme and used on intruder operations 1941–1942

Following the Battle of Britain, the Hurricane continued to give service; through the Blitz of 1941, it was the principal single-seat night fighter in Fighter Command. F/Lt. Richard Stevens claimed 14 Luftwaffe bombers flying Hurricanes in 1941. In 1942, the cannon-armed Mk.IIc performed further afield, as a night intruder over occupied Europe. F/Lt. Karel Kuttelwascher of 1 Squadron proved the top scorer, with 15 Luftwaffe bombers claimed shot down. The year 1942 also had the manufacture of 12 Hurricane II C(NF) night fighters, equipped with pilot-operated air interception Mark VI radar. After a brief operational deployment with No. 245 and No. 247 Squadron RAF, during which these aircraft proved too slow for operations in Europe, the aircraft were sent to India to serve with No. 176 Squadron RAF in the defence of Calcutta. They were withdrawn from service at the end of December 1943.

=== North Africa ===
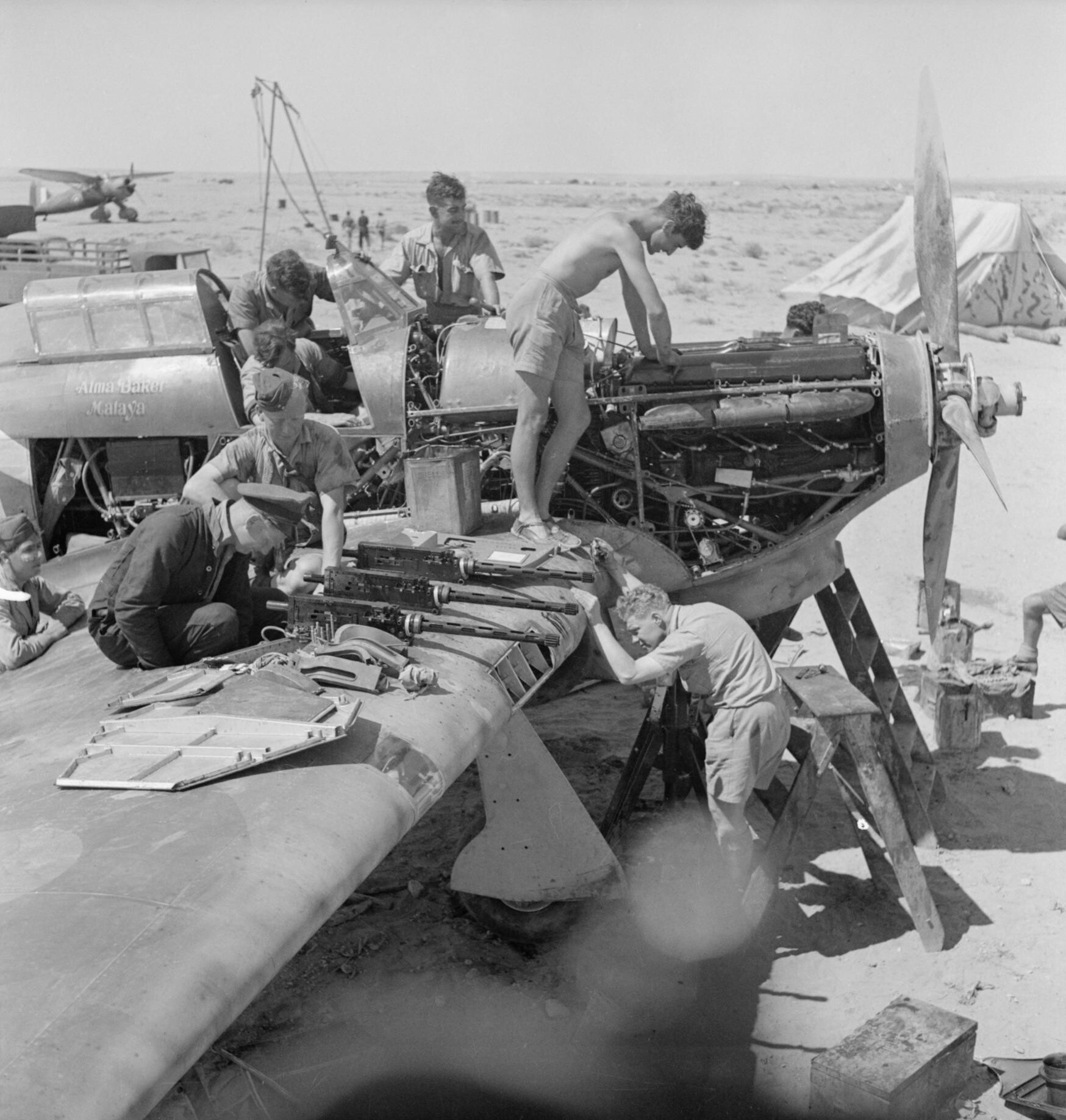
Maintenance work being carried out on a Hurricane of 274 Squadron during the siege of Tobruk

A Hurricane Mk.I undertook tropical trials in Sudan in mid-1939, and a number were hastily tropicalised following Italy's entry into the war in June 1940. These aircraft were initially ferried through France and Malta by air to 80 Squadron in Egypt, replacing Gladiator biplanes. The Hurricane claimed its first kill in the Mediterranean on 19 June 1940, when F/O P.G. Wykeham-Barnes reported shooting down two Fiat CR.42 Falcos.

The 109 was faster, had a better climb and much better altitude performance, which constantly enabled it to attack with the advantage of height but the old 'Hurri' provided some considerable comfort in its ruggedness and extreme manoeuvrability. I certainly had the feeling that with this ruggedness and manoeuvrability no one could get me as long as I could see him coming

— Wing Commander George Keefer in Hurricane : The plane that saved Britain.

Hurricanes served with several British Commonwealth squadrons in the Desert Air Force. They suffered heavy losses over North Africa after the arrival of Bf 109E and -F variants and were progressively replaced in the air-superiority role from June 1941 by Curtiss Tomahawks/Kittyhawks. However, fighter-bomber variants ("Hurribombers") retained an edge in the ground attack role, due to their impressive armament of four 20 mm (0.79 in) cannon and a 500 lb (230 kg) bomb load.

From November 1941, beginning in the Libyan desert, it had to face a new formidable opponent, the new Regia Aeronautica Macchi C.202 Folgore. The Italian aircraft proved superior to the Hawker fighter, and due to its excellent agility and a new, more powerful, inline engine licence-built by Alfa Romeo, could outperform it in a dogfight.

During and following the five-day Second Battle of El Alamein artillery barrage that commenced on the night of 23 October 1942, six squadrons of Hurricanes, including the 40 mm (1.57 in) cannon-armed Hurricane Mk.IID version, claimed to have destroyed 39 tanks, 212 lorries and armoured troop-carriers, 26 bowsers, 42 guns, 200 various other vehicles, and four small fuel and ammunition dumps, flying 842 sorties with the loss of 11 pilots. Whilst performing in a ground-support role, Hurricanes based at RAF Castel Benito, Tripoli, knocked out six tanks, 13 armoured vehicles, 10 lorries, five half-tracks, a gun and trailer, and a wireless van on 10 March 1943, with no losses to themselves.

In the spring of 1943, during the German Ochsenkopf offensive in Tunisia, Hurricane IIDs conducted many sorties after fog had lifted, helping to blunt the final attack at Hunts Gap.

=== Defence of Malta ===
The Hurricane played a significant role in the defence of Malta. When Italy entered the war on 10 June 1940, Malta's air defence rested on Gloster Gladiators, which managed to hold out against vastly superior numbers of the Italian air force during the following 17 days. Initially, six Gladiators, though after a while, only three, were able to be flown at any one time because of a shortage of spare parts, and for whatever reason (five different explanations have been given), they became known as "Faith, Hope, and Charity". Four Hurricanes joined them at the end of June, and together they faced attacks throughout July from the 200 enemy aircraft based in Sicily, with the loss of one Gladiator and one Hurricane. Further reinforcements arrived on 2 August in the form of 12 more Hurricanes and two Blackburn Skuas. (Note: This was code-named Operation Hurry. These aircraft were flown off the carrier HMS Argus.)

For weeks a handful of Hurricane IIs, aided by Group Captain A.B. Woodhall's masterly controlling, had been meeting, against all the odds, the rising crescendo of Field Marshal Kesselring's relentless attacks on Grand Harbour and the airfields. Outnumbered, usually, by 12 or 14 to one and, later – with the arrival of the Bf 109Fs in Sicily – outperformed, the pilots of the few old aircraft which the ground crews struggled valiantly to keep serviceable, went on pressing their attacks, ploughing their way through the German fighter screens, and our flak, to close in with the Ju 87s and 88s as they dived for their targets.

— Wing Commander Percy Lucas quoted in Bader (2004)

The increasing number of British aircraft on the island, at last, prompted the Italians to employ German Junkers Ju 87 dive bombers to try to destroy the airfields. Finally, in an attempt to overcome the stiff resistance put up by these few aircraft, the Luftwaffe took up base on the Sicilian airfields, only to find that Malta was not an easy target. After numerous attacks on the island over the following months, and the arrival of an extra 23 Hurricanes at the end of April 1941, and a further delivery a month later, the Luftwaffe left Sicily for the Russian Front in June that year.

As Malta was situated on the increasingly important sea supply route for the North African campaign, the Luftwaffe returned with a vengeance for a second assault on the island at the beginning of 1942. Not until March, when the onslaught was at its height, did 15 Spitfires arrive from the carrier HMS Eagle to bolster the defence, but many of the new aircraft were lost on the ground, and the Hurricane bore the brunt of the early fighting until further reinforcements arrived.

=== Air defence in the Soviet Union ===
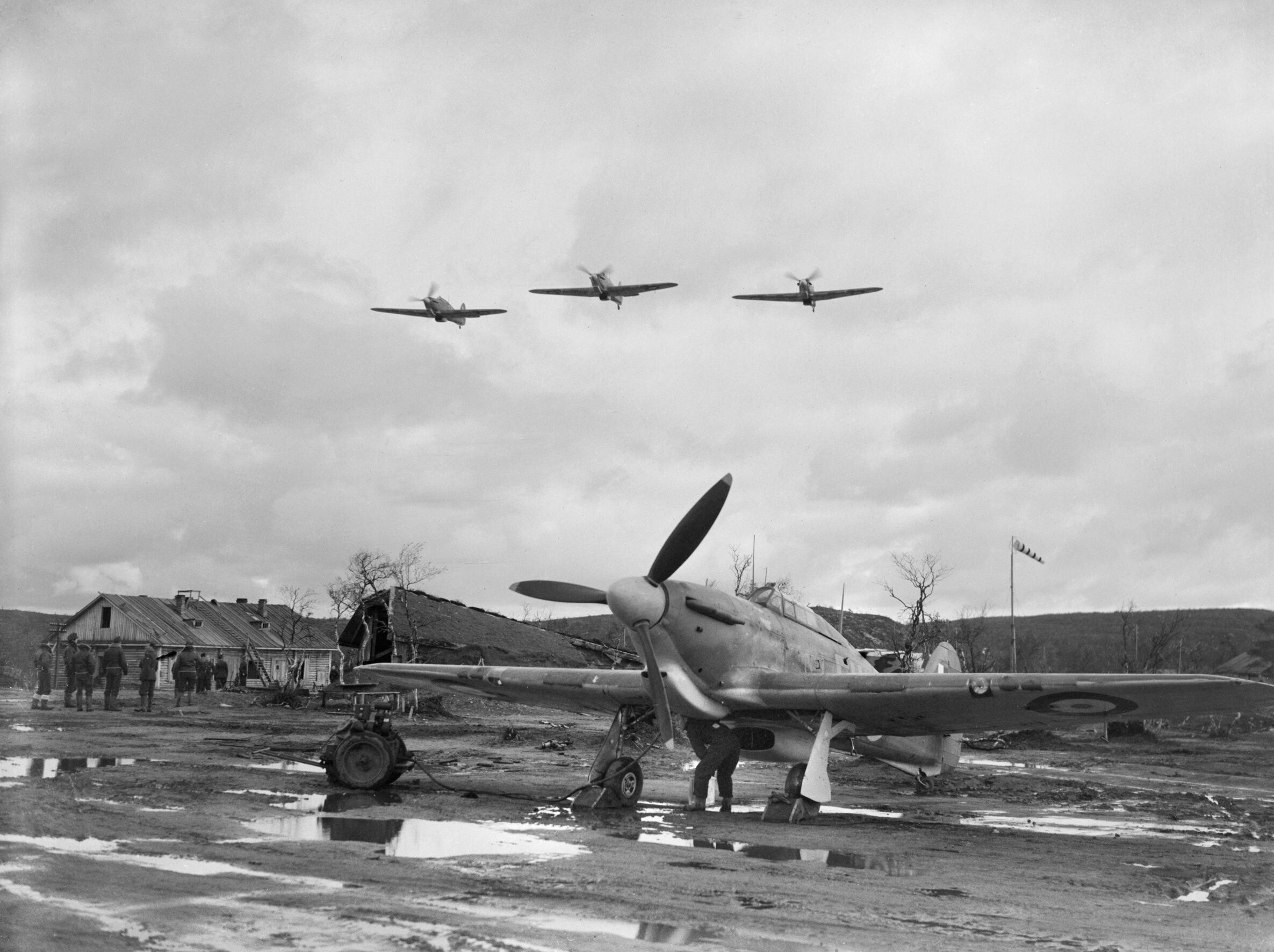
Hurricane Mk.IIB of No. 81 Squadron RAF at Murmansk-Vaenga airfield, Russia

The Hawker Hurricane was the first Allied Lend-Lease aircraft to be delivered to the Soviet Union, with a total of 2,952 Hurricanes eventually delivered, becoming the most numerous British aircraft in Soviet service. Many Soviet pilots were disappointed by the Hawker fighter, regarding it as inferior to both German and Soviet aircraft. In July 2023, a crate of eight Hurricanes was found buried in Ukraine. These had been supplied by the US, but under the terms of Lease Lend, the Russians did not have to pay for equipment that did not survive the war.

During 1941, Mk.II Hurricanes played an important air-defence role when the Soviet Union found itself under threat from the approaching German Army, which was advancing across a broad front stretching from Leningrad and Moscow to the oil fields in the south. Britain's decision to aid the Soviets meant sending supplies by sea to the far northern ports, and as the convoys needed to sail within range of enemy air attack from the Luftwaffe based in neighbouring Finland, it was decided to deliver a number of Hurricane Mk.IIBs, flying with Nos. 81 and 134 Squadrons of No. 151 Wing RAF, to provide protection. Twenty-four were transported on the carrier Argus, arriving just off Murmansk on 28 August 1941, with another 15 crated aircraft on board merchant vessels. In addition to their convoy protection duties, the aircraft also acted as escorts to Soviet bombers. Enemy attention to the area declined in October, when the RAF pilots trained their Soviet counterparts to operate the Hurricanes themselves. By the end of the year, the RAF's direct role in the region had ended, but the aircraft remained behind and became the first of thousands of Allied aircraft that were accepted by the Soviet Union. Although Soviet pilots were not universally enthusiastic about the Hurricane, twice-Hero of the Soviet Union Lt. Col. Boris Safonov "loved the Hurricane", and RAF Hurricane Mk.IIB fighters operating from Soviet soil in defence of Murmansk, destroyed 15 Luftwaffe aircraft for only one loss in combat. However, in some Soviet war memoirs, the Hurricane has been described in very unflattering terms.

The "Soviet" IIB Hurricane as a multirole fighter-bomber had quite a few drawbacks. First, it was 25–31 mph (40–50 km/h) slower than its main opponent, the Bf 109E interceptor, at low and medium altitudes, and had a slower rate of climb. The Messerschmitt could outdive the Hurricane because of the thicker wing profile of the British fighter, but the main source of complaints was the Hurricane's armament. On occasion, the eight- or 12-rifle-calibre machine guns did not damage the sturdy and heavily armoured German aircraft; consequently, Soviet ground crews started to remove the Brownings. Retaining only four or six of the 12 machine guns, two 12.7 mm (0.50 in) Berezin UBs or two or even four 20 mm (0.79 in) ShVAK cannons were substituted, but overall performance deteriorated as a result. (Note: Soviet pilot Nikolai G. Golodnikov remembered: "The Hurricane's engine was powerful, but it couldn't stand long periods of work at maximum regimes and would quickly break down. The engine worked very clean, it had exhaust stacks and flame suppressors, mounted like mufflers. (Note: Soviet Hurricanes were fuelled with 95 octane avgas, not the 100 Octane fuel that the Merlin XX was designed to use.) This was very comfortable, as the flames did not blind the pilot. Our planes were much worse in this respect. But at negative G-forces the engine choked. There was no compensating tank. This was very bad because we had to execute any manoeuvre with positive G-forces. It had a very thick wing profile and poor acceleration characteristics. It was not slow in responding to the control stick, but everything happened smoothly, slowly. It had good lifting strength and was very good in horizontal manoeuvrability. But the Hurricane was very poor in vertical manoeuvre, due to thick wing profile. We mostly tried to impose a battle in the horizontal plane and would not go into a vertical one. The Hurricane burned rapidly — and to cinders like a match — as it had dural covering only on the tail and wings, the rest was percale.")

The British archives file AIR 22/310 reports 218 Mk.IIAs sent to the Soviet Union or handed over, 22 lost before arrival, 1,884 Mk.IIBs sent or handed over, 278 lost before arrival, 1,182 Mk.IICs sent or handed over, 46 lost before arrival, 117 rejected, 60 IIDs sent or handed over, 14 rejected, 30 Mk.IVs handed over, total 3,374 Hurricanes sent or handed over, 346 lost before delivery, 2,897 accepted by the Soviets, 131 rejected.

=== Southeast Asia ===
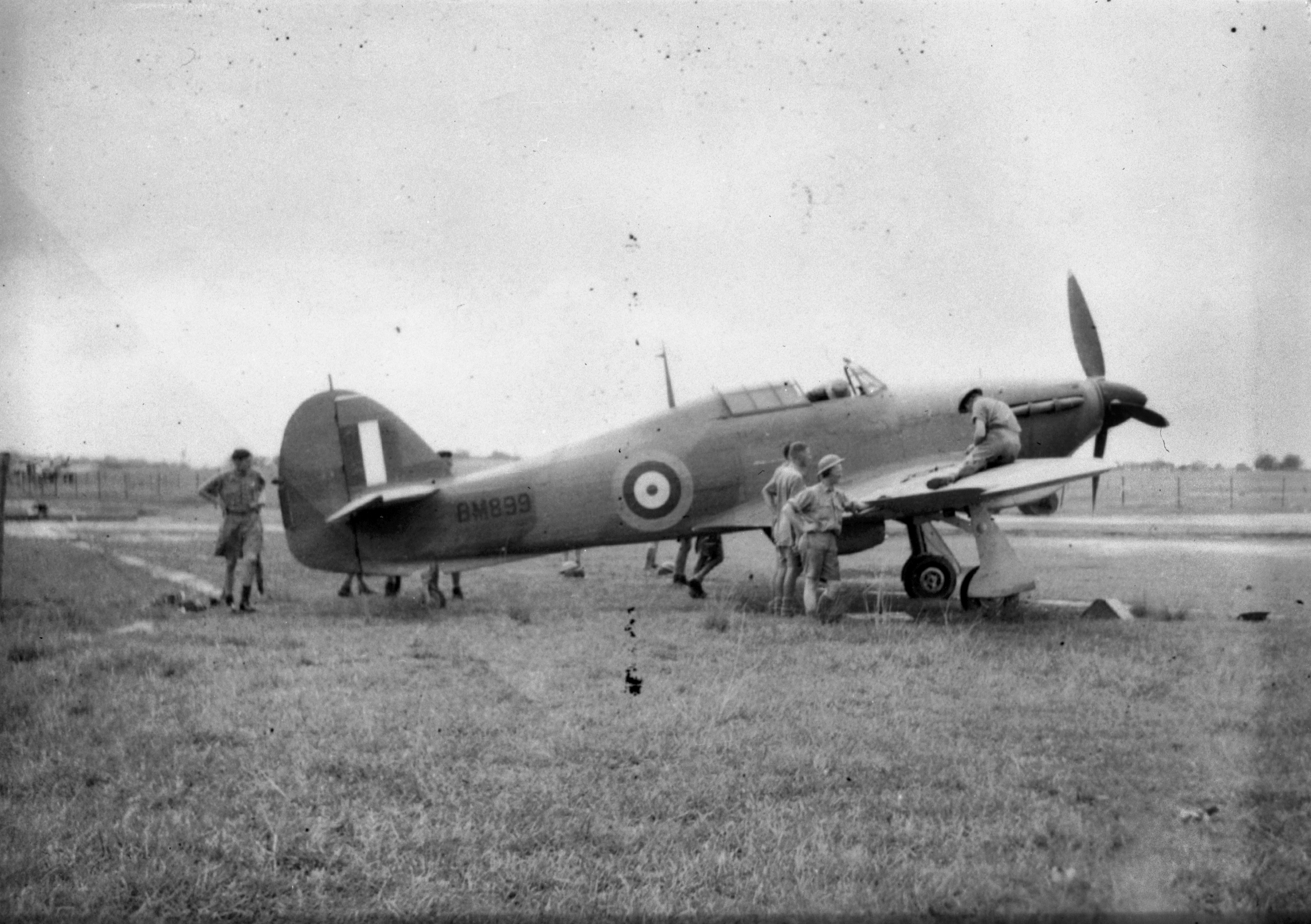
Hawker Hurricane Mk.IIB/Trop of 488 Squadron RNZAF at RAF Kallang, January 1942

Following the outbreak of the war with Japan, 51 Hurricane Mk.IIBs en route to Iraq were diverted to Singapore; 10 were in crates, the others partially disassembled, these and the 24 pilots (many of whom were veterans of the Battle of Britain), who had been transferred to the theatre, formed the nucleus of five squadrons. They arrived on 13 January 1942, by which time the Allied fighter squadrons in Singapore, flying Brewster Buffalos, had been overwhelmed during the Malayan campaign. The fighters of the Imperial Japanese Army Air Force, especially the Nakajima Ki-43 Oscar, had been underestimated in its capability, numbers, and the strategy of its commanders.

Thanks to the efforts of No. 151 Maintenance Unit RAF, the 51 Hurricanes were assembled and ready for testing within 48 hours, and of these, 21 were ready for operational service within three days. The Hurricanes, originally intended for the Middle East theatre, were fitted with bulky Vokes dust filters under the nose and were armed with 12, rather than eight, machine guns. The additional weight and drag made them slow to climb and unwieldy to manoeuvre at altitude, although they were more effective bomber killers.

The recently arrived pilots were formed into 232 Squadron and 488 (NZ) Squadron, flying Buffalos, converted to Hurricanes. On 18 January, the two squadrons formed the basis of 226 Group; 232 Squadron became operational on 22 January and suffered the first losses and victories for the Hurricane in Southeast Asia. Between 27 and 30 January, another 48 Hurricanes Mk.IIB arrived with the aircraft carrier HMS Indomitable, from which they flew to airfields code-named P1 and P2, near Palembang, Sumatra in the Netherlands East Indies.

The Hurricanes first saw action on the morning of 20 January 1942, when 12 aircraft of 232 Squadron intercepted a mixed IJN and IJAAF formation of about 80 bombers escorted by fighters, the heaviest air raid on Singapore. Eight were claimed shot down and three probables, but three Hurricanes were lost along with two pilots, including Squadron Leader Leslie Ninian Landels.

Because of inadequate early-warning systems (the first British radar stations became operational only towards the end of February), Japanese air raids were able to destroy 30 Hurricanes on the ground in Sumatra, most of them in one raid on 7 February. After Japanese landings in Singapore, on 10 February, the remnants of 232 and 488 Squadrons were withdrawn to Palembang. Japanese paratroopers began the invasion of Sumatra on 13 February. Hurricanes destroyed six Japanese transport ships on 14 February, but lost seven aircraft in the process. On 18 February, the remaining Allied aircraft and aircrews moved to Java, with only 18 serviceable Hurricanes out of the original 99. That month, 12 Hurricane Mk.IIB Trops were supplied to the Dutch forces on Java. With dust filters removed and fuel and ammunition load in wings halved, these were able to stay in a turn with the Oscars they fought. After Java was invaded, some of the New Zealand pilots were evacuated by sea to Australia.

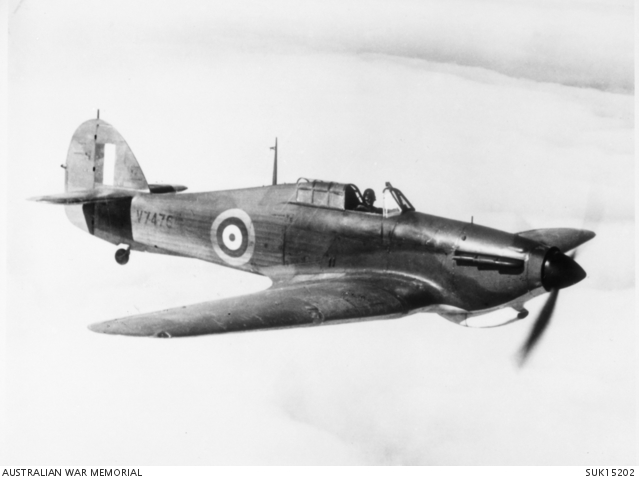
Hurricane V7476 sent to Australia in May 1941, arriving in August, was the only Hurricane based in Australia during the Second World War. The tropicalised Vokes air filter, which was fitted to many types operating in the Pacific, is visible under the nose.

When a Japanese carrier task force under the command of Admiral Chūichi Nagumo made a sortie into the Indian Ocean in April 1942, RAF Hurricanes based on Ceylon saw action against Nagumo's forces during attacks on Colombo on 5 April 1942 and on Trincomalee Harbour on 9 April 1942.

On 5 April 1942, Captain Mitsuo Fuchida of the Imperial Japanese Navy, who led the attack on Pearl Harbor, led a strike against Colombo with 53 Nakajima B5N torpedo bombers and 38 Aichi D3A dive bombers, escorted by 36 Mitsubishi A6M Zero fighters. They were opposed by 35 Hurricane I and IIBs of 30 and 258 Squadrons, together with six Fairey Fulmars of 803 and 806 Naval Air Squadrons of the Fleet Air Arm. The Hurricanes mainly tried to shoot down the attacking bombers, but were engaged heavily by the escorting Zeros. A total of 21 Hurricanes were shot down (although two of these were repairable), together with four Fulmars and six Swordfish of 788 Naval Air Squadron that had been surprised in flight by the raid. The RAF claimed 18 Japanese aircraft destroyed, seven probably destroyed, and nine damaged, with one aircraft claimed by a Fulmar and five by antiaircraft fire. This compared with actual Japanese losses of one Zero and six D3As, with a further seven D3As, five B5Ns, and three Zeros damaged.

On 9 April 1942, the Japanese task force sent 91 B5Ns escorted by 41 Zeros against Trincomalee port and the nearby China Bay airfield. Sixteen Hurricanes opposed the raid, of which eight were lost with a further three damaged. They claimed eight Japanese aircraft destroyed with a further four probably destroyed and at least five damaged. Actual Japanese losses were three A6Ms and two B5Ns, with a further 10 B5Ns damaged.

Air battles over Arakan in 1943 represented the last large-scale use of the Hurricane as a pure fighter. However, in Burma, several squadrons flew Mk II and Mk IV Hurricanes, in the ground-attack role, until the end of the war. Its pilots were occasionally caught up in air combat; for example, on 15 February 1944, Flg Off Jagadish Chandra Verma of No. 6 Squadron, Royal Indian Air Force (RIAF), shot down a Japanese Ki-43 Oscar – the only air-to-air victory for the RIAF during the Second World War.

=== Late-war use ===
The Hurricane remained in service as a fighter-bomber over the Balkans and at home, as well, where it was used mainly for second-line tasks and occasionally flown by ace pilots. For example, in mid-1944, Squadron Leader "Jas" Storrar of No. 1687 Flight RAF, used a Hurricane to courier documents to Allied ground forces in France, during the Normandy invasion.

=== Aircraft carrier operations ===
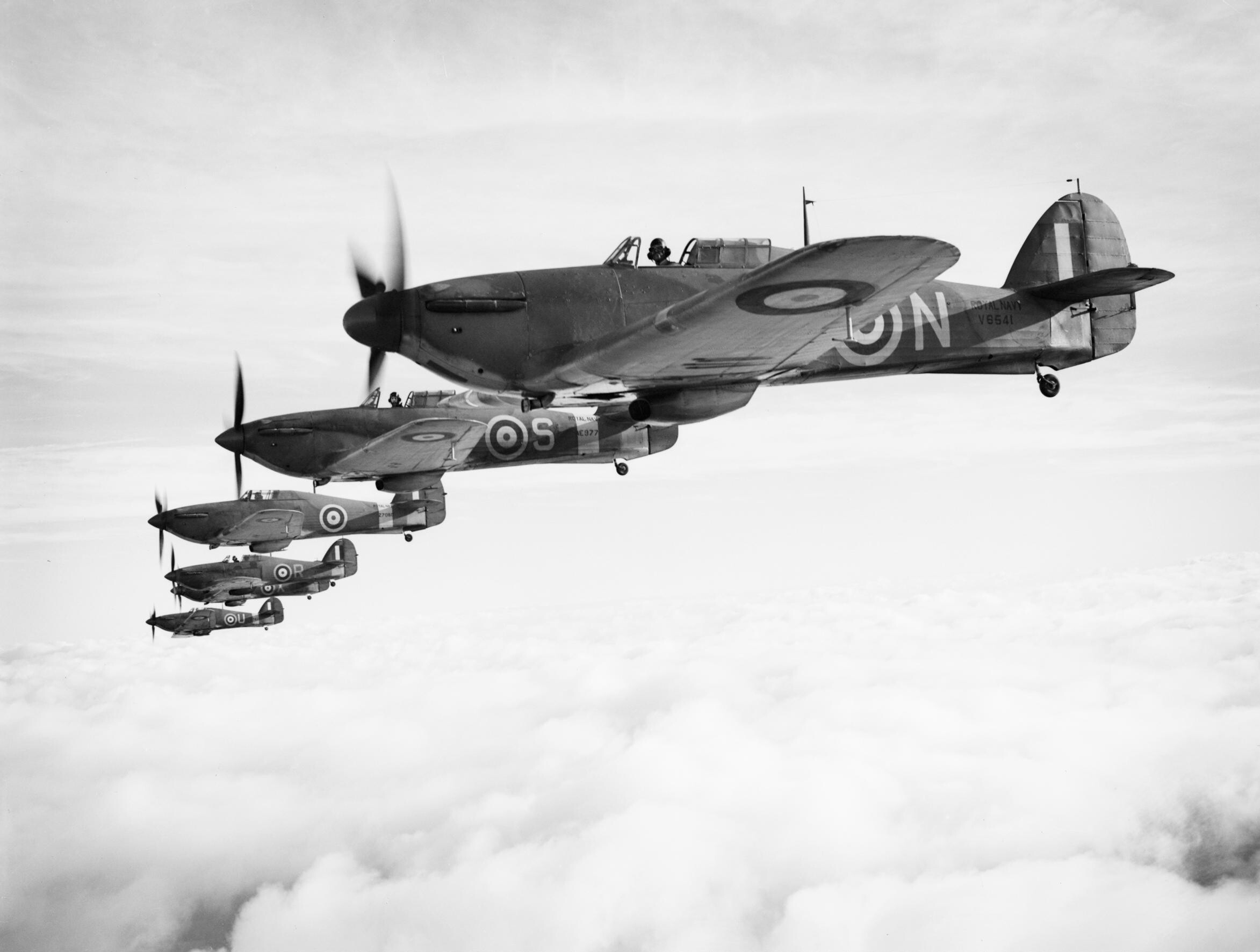
Sea Hurricane Mk.IB in formation, December 1941

The Sea Hurricane became operational in mid-1941 and scored its first kill while operating from HMS Furious on 31 July 1941. During the next three years, Fleet Air Arm Sea Hurricanes were to feature prominently while operating from Royal Navy aircraft carriers. The Sea Hurricane scored an impressive kill-to-loss ratio, (Note: Malta: The Spitfire Year 1942 records 28 Sea Hurricane victories against eight losses during Operation Harpoon and Operation Pedestal.) primarily while defending Malta convoys, and operating from escort carriers in the Atlantic Ocean. For example, on 26 May 1944, Royal Navy Sea Hurricanes operating from the escort carrier HMS Nairana claimed the destruction of three Ju 290 reconnaissance aircraft during the defence of a convoy.

=== Finland ===
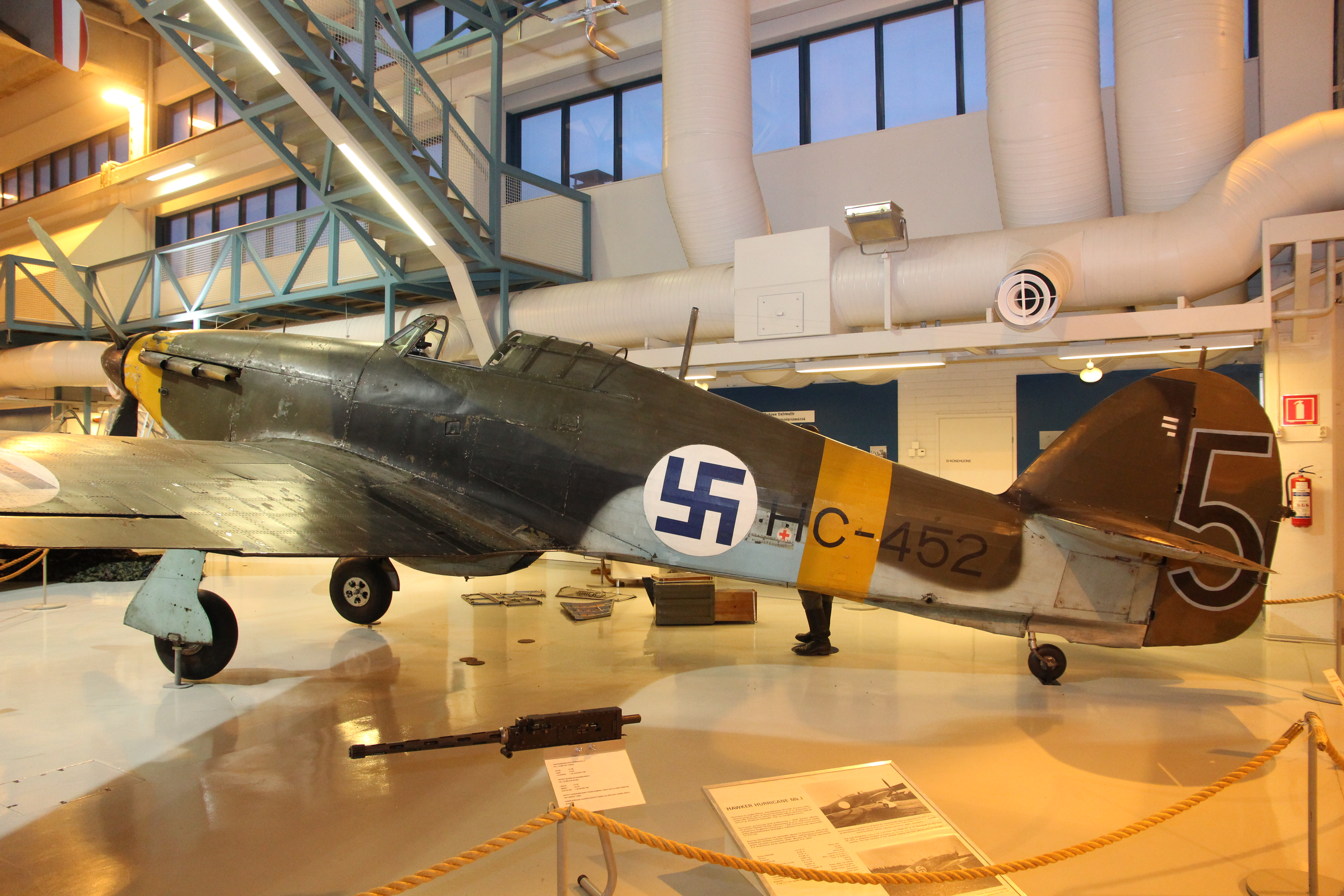
Finnish Hurricane Mk.I at the Finnish Air Force Museum

During the Winter War, the Finnish Air Force were in dire need of modern fighters and sourced them from several countries, including the United Kingdom. Finland bought 12 Hurricanes and the delivery commenced on 2 February 1940. The Hurricanes were flown from St Athan, Wales, to Västerås, Sweden, via Scotland and Norway by Finnish pilots in two batches. The first batch arrived in Västerås on 29 February, with the last aircraft arriving on 10 March. During the second batch flight, two Hurricanes were lost, with one crashing in Norway and the other being damaged during landing in Scotland and left there. The Hurricanes were initially deployed to LLv 22. Later, they were transferred to LLv 28 and finally moved to LLv 30. During the period of Interim Peace, two further Hurricanes were lost in accidents.

At the start of the Continuation War on 25 June 1941, the Hurricanes were allocated to LLv 30. On 2 July 1941, a Hurricane was mistakenly shot down by friendly antiaircraft fire at Vainikkala. The Finnish Hurricanes' first combat came on 3 July, when three encountered several Soviet fighters and shot down an I-153 "Chaika". In the next day, the Hurricane shot down a Tupolev SB bomber. Other encounters with Soviet fighters took place on 15 July above the Karelian Isthmus, with two I-153 claimed as being shot down. The last aircraft shot down by Finnish Hurricanes was an I-15 on 6 January 1942.

== Hurricane aces ==
Top-scoring Hurricane pilots:

- Squadron Leader Marmaduke "Pat" Pattle, with 35 Hawker fighter victories (out of career 50 total, with two shared) serving with No. 80 and 33 Squadrons: All of his Hurricane kills were achieved over Greece in 1941. He was shot down and killed in the Battle of Athens on 20 April 1941.
- Squadron Leader Douglas Bader was a legendary flying ace who flew Hurricanes with No. 242 Squadron during the Battle of Britain. He was credited with 22 aerial victories, four shared victories, six probables, one shared probable, and 11 enemy aircraft damaged.
- Wing Commander Frank Reginald Carey claimed 28 air victories while flying Hurricanes during 1939–43.
- Squadron Leader William "Cherry" Vale totalled 20 kills (of 30) in Greece and Syria with No. 80 Squadron.
- Czech pilot Flight Lieutenant Karel Kuttelwascher achieved all of his 18 air victories with the Hurricane, most as an intruder night fighter with No. 1 Squadron.
- Pilot Officer Vernon Crompton Woodward (33 and 213 Squadrons) was another top-scoring ace with 14 (out of 18 total, three of which are shared).
- Flying Officer Willie McKnight scored at least 17 victories in Hurricanes.
- Flight Lieutenant Richard P. Stevens claimed all of his 14.5 enemy aircraft flying the Hurricane.
- Richard "Dickie" Cork was the leading Fleet Air Arm Sea Hurricane ace, with nine destroyed, two shared, one probable, four damaged, and seven destroyed on the ground.
- Czech pilot Josef František, flying with 303 Polish Squadron, shot down at least 17 enemy aircraft over southeast England during September–October 1940.
- Polish pilot Witold Urbanowicz, flying with 303 Polish Squadron, had 15 confirmed kills and one probable during the Battle of Britain.
- Wing Commander Ian Gleed claimed most of his 13 victories while flying Hurricanes with No. 87 Squadron from the Battle of France through the end of 1941.
- Wing Commander Mark Henry Brown scored 18 victories with No. 1 Squadron. He was the first Canadian ace of the Second World War and was killed on a strafing mission in Sicily in November 1941.

Pilots of note:

- Marshal of the Air Force Arjan Singh, DFC, was a British Indian fighter pilot who was awarded the Distinguished Flying Cross for his flying during the Burma campaign. He went on to become the Chief of Air staff of the Indian Air Force and was given the honorary rank of Marshal of the Air Force for his leadership during the Indo-Pakistan war of 1965.
- 2nd Officer Winifred Crossley Fair. ATA Pilot. First woman to fly a Hawker Hurricane.
- Wing Commander James Brindley Nicolson, VC, DFC. The only Battle of Britain pilot and the only pilot of RAF Fighter Command to be awarded the Victoria Cross during the Second World War.
- Roald Dahl flew a Hurricane in the Battle of Athens, which he describes in his second autobiography Going Solo.

== Variants ==
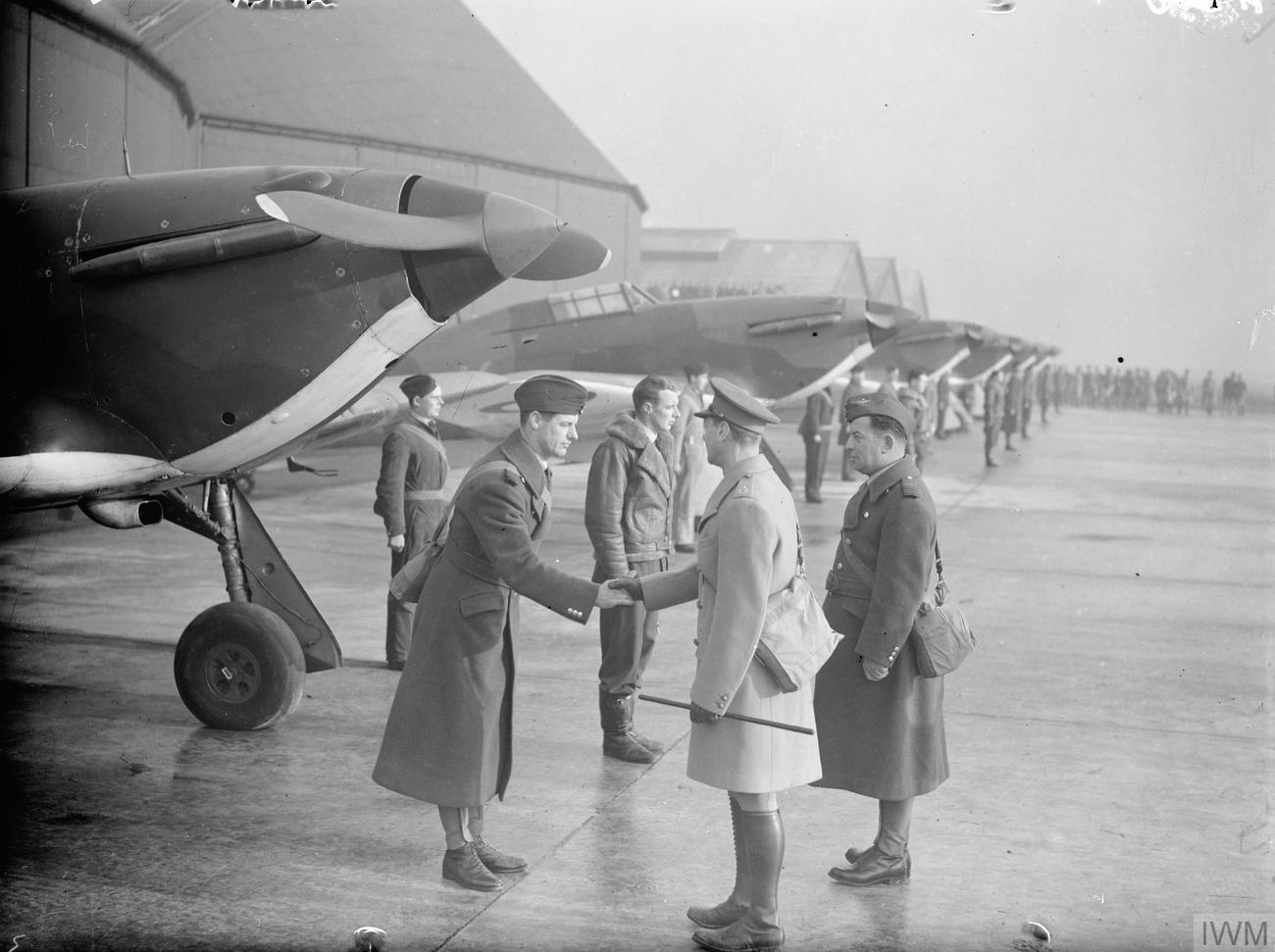
Mk Is in France with original two-bladed Watts propellers

Hurricane Mk.I
First production version, with fabric-covered wings, a wooden two-bladed, fixed-pitch propeller (first 435) or three blade two -pitch propeller, powered by the 1,030 hp (770 kW) Rolls-Royce Merlin Mk.II (first 364) or III engines and armed with eight .303 in (7.7 mm) Browning machine guns. Produced between 1937 and 1939.

Hurricane Mk.I (revised)
A revised Hurricane Mk.I series built with a de Havilland or Rotol constant speed propeller (from February 1940), metal-covered wings, armour and other improvements. A total of 4,200 Mk.Is were built; 1,924 by Hawker, 1,850 by Gloster Aircraft Company and 426 by Canadian Car and Foundry between December 1937 and October 1941. Apart from 30 retained in Canada the Canadian Car and Foundry Hurricanes were shipped to England to be fitted with engines.

Hurricane Mk.IIA Series 1
Hurricane Mk.I powered by the improved Merlin XX engine with two-speed supercharger. This new engine used a coolant mix of 30% glycol and 70% water. Pure glycol is flammable, so not only was the new mix safer, but the engine also ran approximately 21 °C (38 °F) cooler, which gave longer engine life and greater reliability. The new engine was longer than the earlier Merlin and so the Hurricane gained a 4.5 in "plug" in front of the cockpit, which made the aircraft slightly more stable due to the slight forward shift in centre of gravity. First flew on 11 June 1940 and went into squadron service in September 1940. Hawker built 418 and Gloster Aircraft Company 33. The series 1 may refer to the first production batch which did not have all the proposed changes incorporated, becoming series 2 when the changes were made. 33 Mk. IIA built by Gloster, 418 by Hawker.

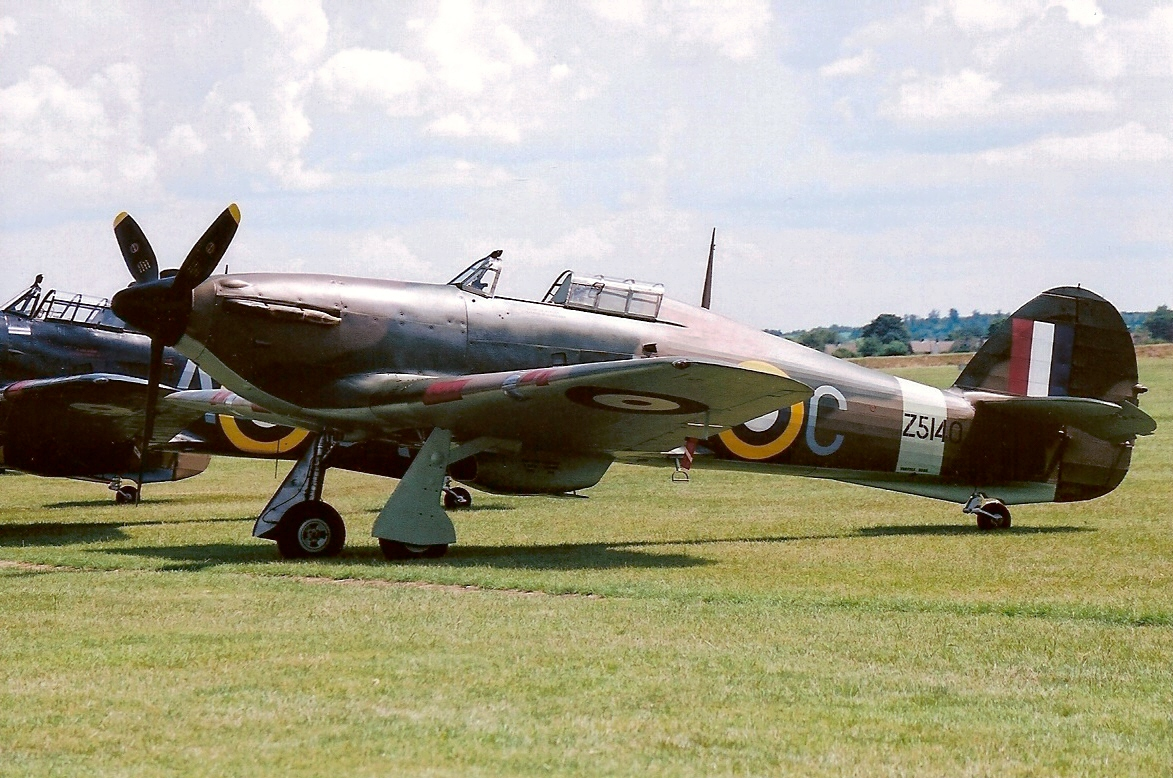
Hawker Hurricane Mk.IIB Z5140

Hurricane Mk.IIB
Carrying four additional wing-mounted .303 in (7.7 mm) Browning machine guns; for a total of 12 guns, 230 were factory fitted with racks allowing them to carry two 250 lb (110 kg) or two 500 lb (230 kg) bombs. This lowered the top speed of the Hurricane to 301 mph (484 km/h), but by this point mixed sweeps of Hurricanes carrying bombs, protected by a screen of fighter Hurricanes were not uncommon. The same racks allowed the Hurricane to carry two 45 imp gal (200 L) drop tanks instead of the bombs, nearly doubling the Hurricane's fuel load.

A total of 3,178 IIBs built in Britain to November 1942, 2,011 by Hawker, 867 by Gloster Aircraft Company and 300 by the Austin Aero Company, plus another 515 by Canadian Car and Foundry built November 1941 to March 1943. Many of the Canadian built aircraft being fitted with C (cannon) wings before delivery to the RAF.

Hurricane Mk.IIB Trop.
For use in North Africa the Hawker Hurricane Mk.IIB (and other variants) were tropicalised. They were fitted with Vokes and Rolls-Royce engine dust filters and the pilots were issued with a desert survival kit, including a bottle of water behind the cockpit.

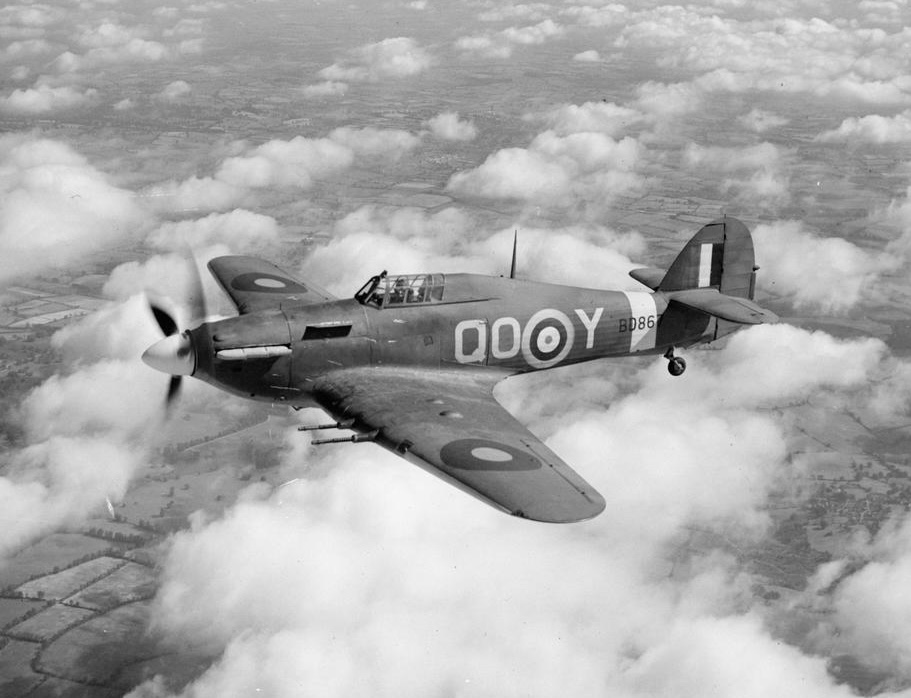
Hurricane Mk.IIC BD867 of 3 Squadron RAF, 1942

Hurricane Mk.IIC
Replaced the machine-gun armament with four 20 mm (0.79 in) Hispano Mk.II cannons, two per wing. The new wings later included a hardpoint for a 500 or 250 lb (230 or 110 kg) bomb and, later again, fuel tanks. By then performance was inferior to the latest German fighters, and the Hurricane changed to the ground-attack role, sometimes referred to as the Hurribomber. The Mk. IIC also served as a night fighter and intruder with about three quarters converted to fighter bombers. There were 4,751 IICs built by Hawker between February 1941 and July 1944.

Hurricane Mk.IID
Armed with two 40 mm (1.57 in) anti-tank autocannon in a gondola-style pod, one under each wing and a single Browning machine gun in each wing loaded with tracers for aiming purposes. The first aircraft flew on 18 September 1941 and deliveries started in 1942. Had additional armour for the pilot, radiator and engine, and were armed with a Rolls-Royce gun with 12 rounds, later changed to the 40 mm (1.57 in) Vickers S gun with 15 rounds. The outer wing attachments were strengthened so that 4G could be pulled at a weight of 8,540 lb (3,870 kg). The weight of guns and armour protection marginally impaired the aircraft's performance. These Hurricanes were nicknamed "Flying Can Openers", perhaps a play on the logo of No. 6 Squadron, which flew the Hurricane starting in 1942. A total of 296 built by Hawker from January 1942 to February 1943.

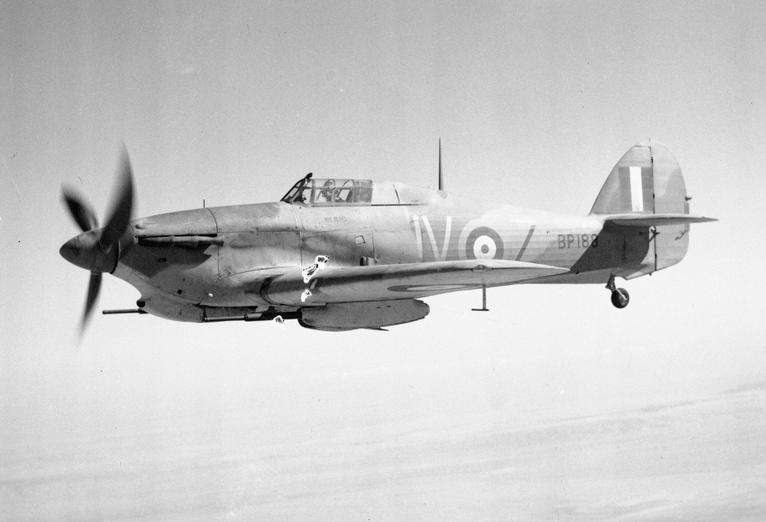
A Hurricane IID of 6 Squadron, showing the Vokes tropical filter and RAF desert camouflage in 1942

Hurricane Mk.IIE
Not an official Mark number. First used informally by the RAF for 100 mark IIB factory fitted with bomb racks built September to December 1941, which were then redesignated mark IIBB. Also used by the Ministry of Aircraft Production March to October 1942 for further production, all up 270 considered built, comprising 230 IIBB and 40 IICB by the later RAF designation (230 IIB and 40 IIC). A signal to the Middle East dated 31 October 1942 states the IIE was not an official mark. The Mk.IIE was not an early Mk.IV.

Hurricane Mk.T.IIC

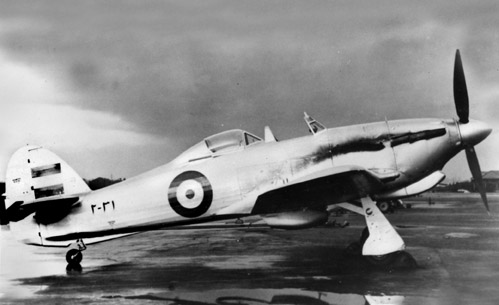

Two-seat training version of the Mk. IIC. Only two aircraft were built, for the Imperial Iranian Air Force.

Hurricane Mk.III
Version of the Hurricane Mk.II powered by a US Packard-built Merlin engine, intending to enable supplies of the British-built engines for other designs. Probably two Canadian built aircraft test flown in Britain with a Merlin 28 starting in May/June 1942 before becoming mark IIB with Merlin XX. By the time production was to have started, British Merlin production had increased to the point where the idea was abandoned.

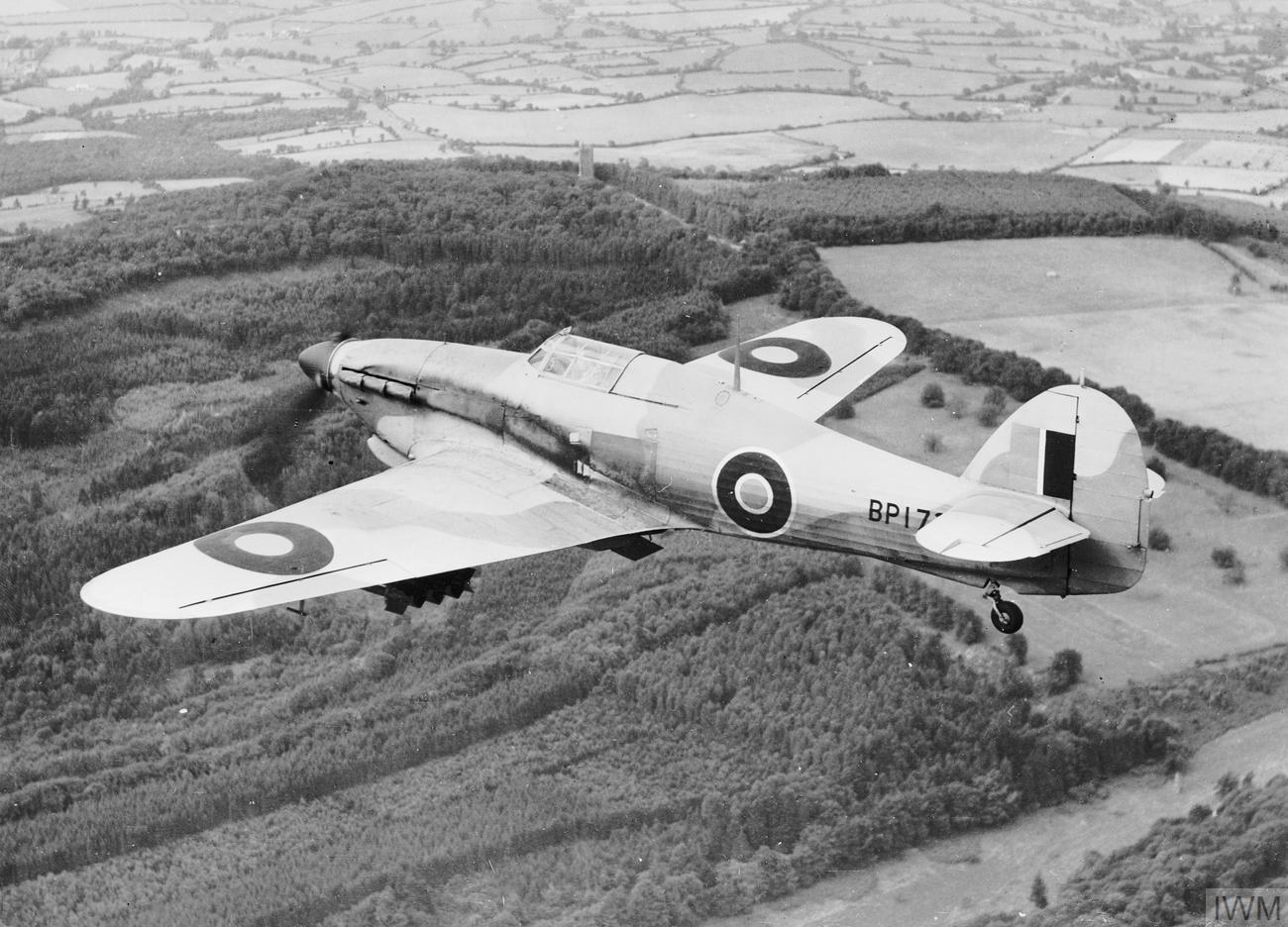
Hurricane Mk.IV, armed with RP-3 rockets

Hurricane Mk.IV
The last major change to the Hurricane was the introduction of the "universal wing", a single design able to mount two 250 or 500 lb (110 or 230 kg) bombs, or two 40 mm (1.57 in) Vickers S guns, or two 40 mm (1.57 in) Rolls-Royce B.H. type guns, two SBC (small bomb containers) or SCI (smoke curtain installation), or two 45 or 90 gallon drop tanks or eight "60 pounder" RP-3 rockets. Two .303 in (7.7 mm) Brownings were fitted to aid aiming of the heavier armament. Despite persistent reports, Mk.IVs were actually fitted with the same Merlin XX as the Mk.II. All Merlin 27s were modified to Merlin 25 and used in Mosquitoes, there were only 16 production Merlin 24s by the time over 300 Mk.IV had been delivered. The individual aircraft cards held by the RAF museum reports the final Mk.IV had a Merlin XX. The radiator was deeper and armoured. Additional armour was also fitted around the engine. 524 built by Hawker between December 1942 and March 1944.

Hurricane Mk.V
The final variant to be produced. Only one was purpose built and two Mk.IV converted, though the variant never reached full-scale production. This was planned to be powered by a Merlin 27 but also tested with a Merlin 32 boosted engine to give 1,700 hp (1,300 kW) at low level and was intended as a dedicated ground-attack aircraft to use in Burma. All three prototypes had four-bladed propellers. The Mk. V replaced the twin 7.7mm machine guns on the Mk. IV with two 20mm cannons, only completed on the third prototype. Speed was 326 mph (525 km/h) at 500 ft (150 m)

Hurricane Mk.X
Not an official Mark number. The Mk.X designation is used by some RAF documents for Canadian Car and Foundry built Mk.I but many references define it as Mk.II airframes fitted with a Merlin 28 Canadian Car and Foundry report building a total of 915 Mk.II airframes for Holland (one), the RAF (514) and the RCAF (400), between November 1941 and May 1943. About two thirds of the Canadian Car and Foundry built Mk.II airframes shipped to Britain did so without an engine, the remainder being fitted with Merlin 28s, but the engine was nearly always removed upon arrival and a Merlin XX fitted instead. These aircraft were considered a Mk.II by the RAF. Apart from some test flights in Canada and England no Hurricane flew powered by a Merlin 28. Canada only imported 285 Merlin 28 for Hurricanes, all of which were shipped to Britain either as a separate engine or attached to a Hurricane.

Hurricane Mk.XI
Not an official Mark. number. Designation used by many references for 150 aircraft from the RCAF Mk.XII order sent to Britain, these aircraft had many items and their Merlin 29 removed before being shipped without an engine or fitted with a Merlin 28. Fitted with Merlin XX on arrival in Britain and called a Mk.II by the RAF.

Hurricane Mk.XII
Canadian-built variant. On 19 August 1941, the Canadian government placed an order with Canadian Car and Foundry for 400 Hurricanes, with 100 meant for the Netherlands and 300 for China, the Netherlands order was amended to 72, the Chinese decided to buy American, which resulted in 328 being offered to the USSR, to be shipped across the Pacific. Amended to all 400 for the RCAF. Originally designated the Mk.IIB (Can), designation changed to Mk.XII in April 1943. Single-seat fighter and fighter-bomber, powered by a 1,300 hp (970 kW) Packard Merlin 29, armed with twelve 0.303 in (7.7 mm) machine guns, production starting in June 1942, 250 served with the RCAF and 150 were sent to Britain in 1943 either without an engine or fitted with a Merlin 28 which was replaced by a Merlin XX on arrival and they became Mk.IIs

Hurricane Mk.XIIA
Canadian-built variant. The survivors of a batch of 30 RAF order Mk.I airframes retained in Canada in late 1941 that were fitted with Merlin III and propellers from Fairey Battles, became Mk. XIIA when fitted with Merlin 29. Armed with eight 0.303 in (7.7 mm) machine guns

Holland standard Hurricane
Canadian built variant. RAF serial airframe AM270 was completed around early March 1942 to Dutch standards, including US built Merlin, instruments and gun sight, as the prototype of an order for the Netherlands East Indies (KM/KNIL). Given the Dutch serial HC3-287, its subsequent fate is unclear beyond being used by Canadian Car and Foundry for test flying. AM270 was also used by the RAF for a Consolidated San Diego built Catalina, creating a further level of confusion.

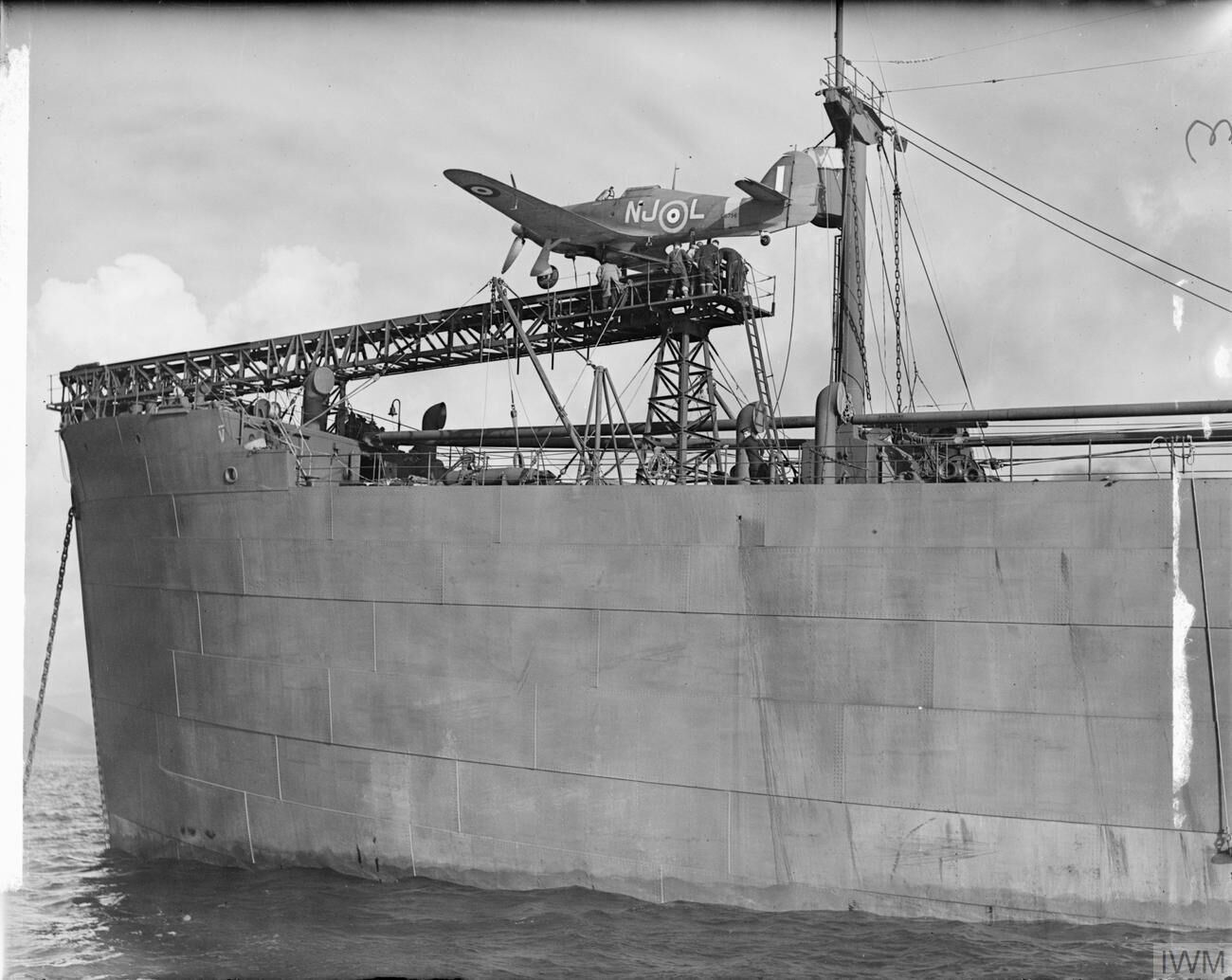

Sea Hurricane Mk.IA
The Sea Hurricane Mk.IA was a Hurricane Mk.I modified by General Aircraft Limited. They were modified to be carried by CAM ships (catapult-armed merchantman), whose ships' crews were Merchant Marine and whose Hurricanes were crewed and serviced by RAF personnel, or Fighter Catapult Ships, which were Naval Auxiliary Vessels crewed by naval personnel and aircraft operated by the Fleet Air Arm. These ships were equipped with a catapult for launching an aircraft, but without facilities to recover them. Consequently, if the aircraft were not in range of a land base, pilots had to bail out or to ditch.
Both of these options had their problems—there was always a chance of striking part of the fuselage when bailing out, and a number of pilots had been killed in this way. Ditching the Hurricane in the sea called for skill as the radiator housing acted as a water brake, pitching the nose of the fighter downwards when it hit the water, while also acting as a very efficient scoop, helping to flood the Hurricane so that a quick exit was necessary before the aircraft sank. Then the pilot had to be picked up by a ship. More than 80 modifications were needed to convert a Hurricane into a Sea Hurricane, including new radios to conform with those used by the Fleet Air Arm and new instrumentation to read in knots rather than miles per hour. They were informally known as "Hurricats".
The majority of the aircraft modified had suffered wear-and-tear serving with front line squadrons, so much so that at least one example used during trials broke up under the stress of a catapult launching. CAM Sea Hurricanes were launched operationally on eight occasions and the Hurricanes shot down six enemy aircraft for the loss of one Hurricane pilot killed. The first Sea Hurricane Mk.IA kill was an Fw 200C Condor, shot down on 2 August 1941. The Hurricanes performance was somewhat hindered as a result of the extra equipment carried that was necessary for carrier operations, although this doesn't seem to have affected its reputation among FAA pilots, with whom it was extremely popular.

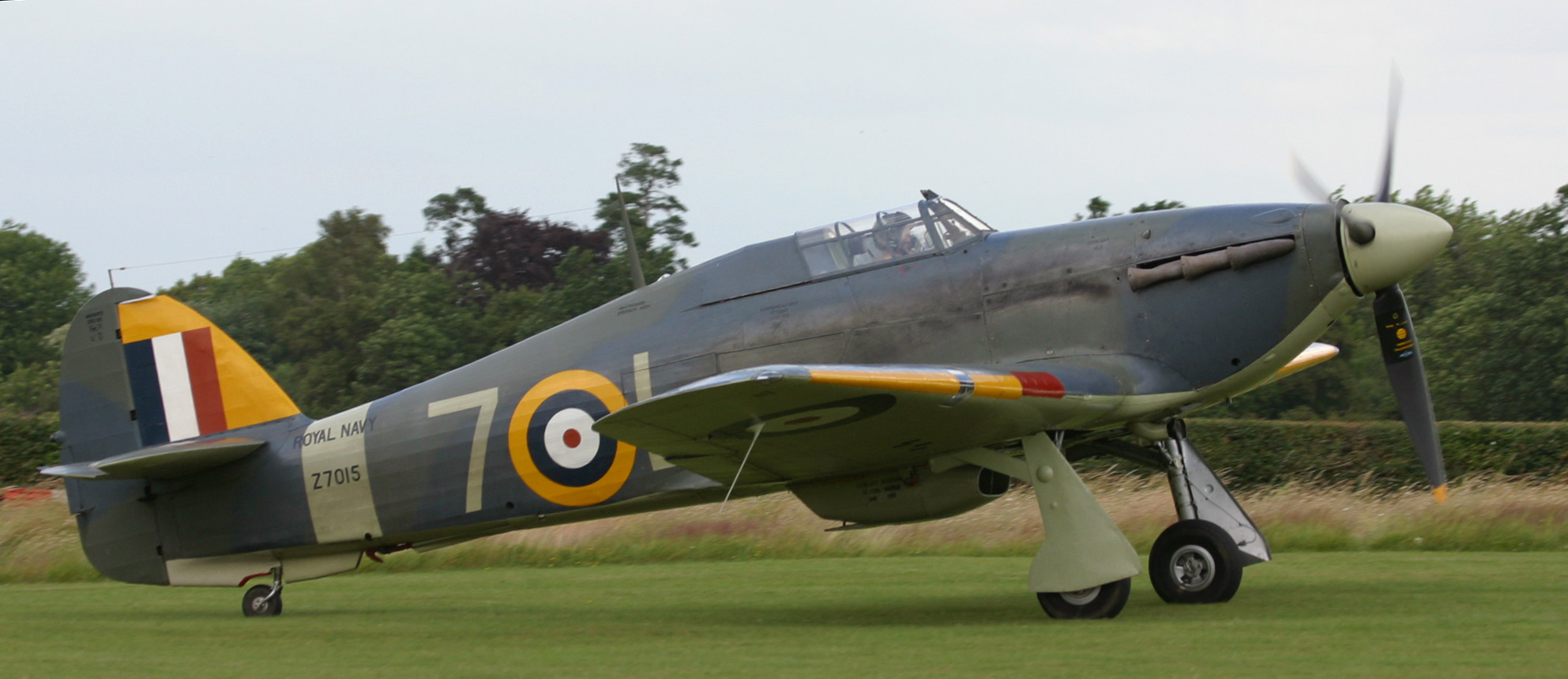
Preserved Sea Hurricane of the Fleet Air Arm

Sea Hurricane Mk.IB
Hurricane Mk.I version equipped with catapult spools plus an arrester hook. From July 1941 they operated from HMS Furious and from October 1941, they were used on merchant aircraft carrier (MAC) ships, which were large cargo vessels with a flight deck fitted, enabling aircraft to be launched and recovered. The first Sea Hurricane Mk.IB kill occurred on 31 July 1941 when Sea Hurricanes of 880 squadron FAA operating from HMS Furious shot down a Do 18 flying-boat.

Apart from the conversions in Britain, 50 Sea Hurricane Mk.I were built in Canada and delivered in late 1941 and early 1942. Initially fitted with a Merlin III, they became Mk.XIIA when later fitted with a Merlin 29.

Sea Hurricane Mk.IC
A Sea Hurricane Mk.I version reported equipped with the four-cannon wing. Despite persistent reports of hundreds converted from early 1942 only eight have been traced, all from a batch of 10 Sea Hurricanes that were sent to General Aircraft Limited in February 1943 from The Merchant Ship Fighter Unit, 7 being returned in May as Ic.

The Sea Hurricane I used during Operation Pedestal had their Merlin III engines modified to accept 16 psi (110 kPa) boost, and could generate more than 1,400 hp (1,000 kW) at low altitude. Lt. R. J. Cork was credited with five kills while flying a Sea Hurricane I during Operation Pedestal.

The RAF reports as of end June 1944 a total of 378 conversions to Sea Hurricane I, less any conversions back to standard Hurricanes, photographic evidence suggests it was 378 transfers to the Royal Navy, most of which were converted to Sea versions.

Sea Hurricane Mk.IIC
60 built by Hawker between November 1942 and May 1943, version equipped with naval radio gear; other standard Mk.IICs were converted and used on fleet carriers. The Merlin XX engine on the Sea Hurricane generated 1,460 hp (1,090 kW) at 6,250 ft (1,900 m) and 1,435 hp (1,070 kW) at 11,000 ft (3,400 m). Top speed was 322 mph (518 km/h) at 13,500 ft (4,100 m) and 342 mph (550 km/h) at 22,000 ft (6,700 m). Another 47 mark IIB converted to Sea mark II, with 45 of them given C wings as part of the conversion.

Sea Hurricane Mk.XIIA
50 Canadian built Sea Hurricane I delivered in late 1941 and early 1942. Initially fitted with Merlin III as Mk.I, the survivors became Mk.XII when fitted with Merlin 29.

Hillson F.40 (a.k.a. F.H.40)
A full-scale version of the Hills & Son Bi-mono slip-wing biplane/monoplane, using a Hawker Hurricane Mk.I returned from Canada as RCAF ser no 321 (RAF serial L1884). Taxi and flight trials carried out at RAF Sealand during May 1943, and at the Aeroplane and Armament Experimental Establishment, Boscombe Down from September 1943. The upper wing was not released in flight before the programme was terminated due to poor performance.

Hurricane Photo Reconnaissance
The Service Depot at Heliopolis in Egypt converted several Hurricanes Is for photo reconnaissance. The first three were converted in January 1941. Two carried a pair of F24 cameras with 8-inch focal length lenses. The third carried one vertical and two oblique F24s with 14-inch focal length lenses mounted in the rear fuselage, close to the trailing edge of the wing, and a fairing was built up over the lenses aft of the radiator housing. A further five Hurricanes were modified in March 1941, and two were converted in a similar manner in Malta during April 1941. During October 1941 a batch of six Hurricane Mk.IIs were converted to PR Mk.II status and a final batch, thought to be of 12 aircraft, was converted in late 1941. The PR Mk.II was said to be capable of slightly over 350 mph (560 km/h) and was able to reach 38,000 ft (12,000 m).

Hurricane Tac R
For duties closer to the front lines some Hurricanes were converted to Tactical Reconnaissance (Tac R) aircraft. An additional radio was fitted for liaison with ground forces who were better placed to direct the Hurricane. Some Hurricane Tac R aircraft also had a vertical camera fitted in the rear fuselage, so to compensate for the extra weight either one or two Brownings or two cannon would be omitted. Externally these aircraft were only distinguishable by the missing armament.

== Operators ==
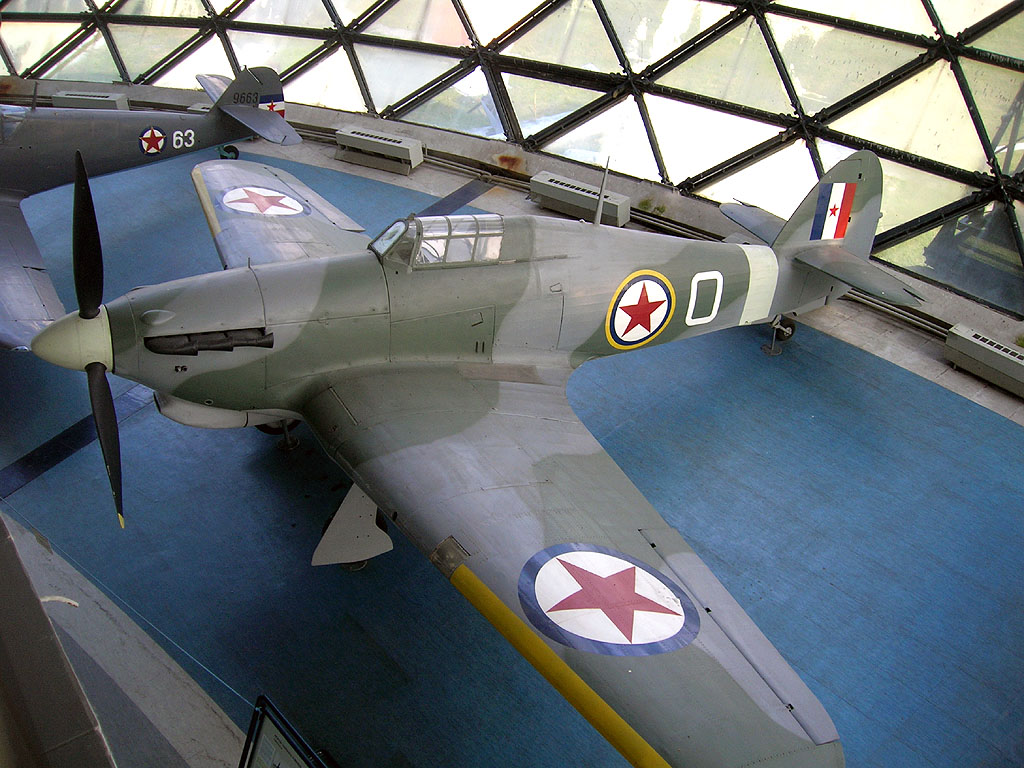
Hawker Hurricane Mk.IVRP with Yugoslav Air Force markings, Museum of Aviation in Belgrade, Belgrade, Serbia

The Hurricane had a long operational life in many theatres of war and was also built by, or exported to, several other countries. In some cases such as Portugal and Ireland, the Hurricane was pressed into service after being forced to land in a neutral country.

In 1939 Latvia ordered and paid for 30 Hurricane fighters, but due to the start of the Second World War later that year, the aircraft were never delivered.

- Australia
- Belgium
- Canada
- Egypt
- France
- Finland
- Germany
- Greece
- British Raj
- Iran
- Ireland
- Italy
- Japan
- Netherlands
- New Zealand
- Norway
- Poland
- Portugal
- Romania
- South Africa
- Soviet Union
- Turkey
- United Kingdom
- Kingdom of Yugoslavia
- Yugoslavia

== Surviving aircraft ==
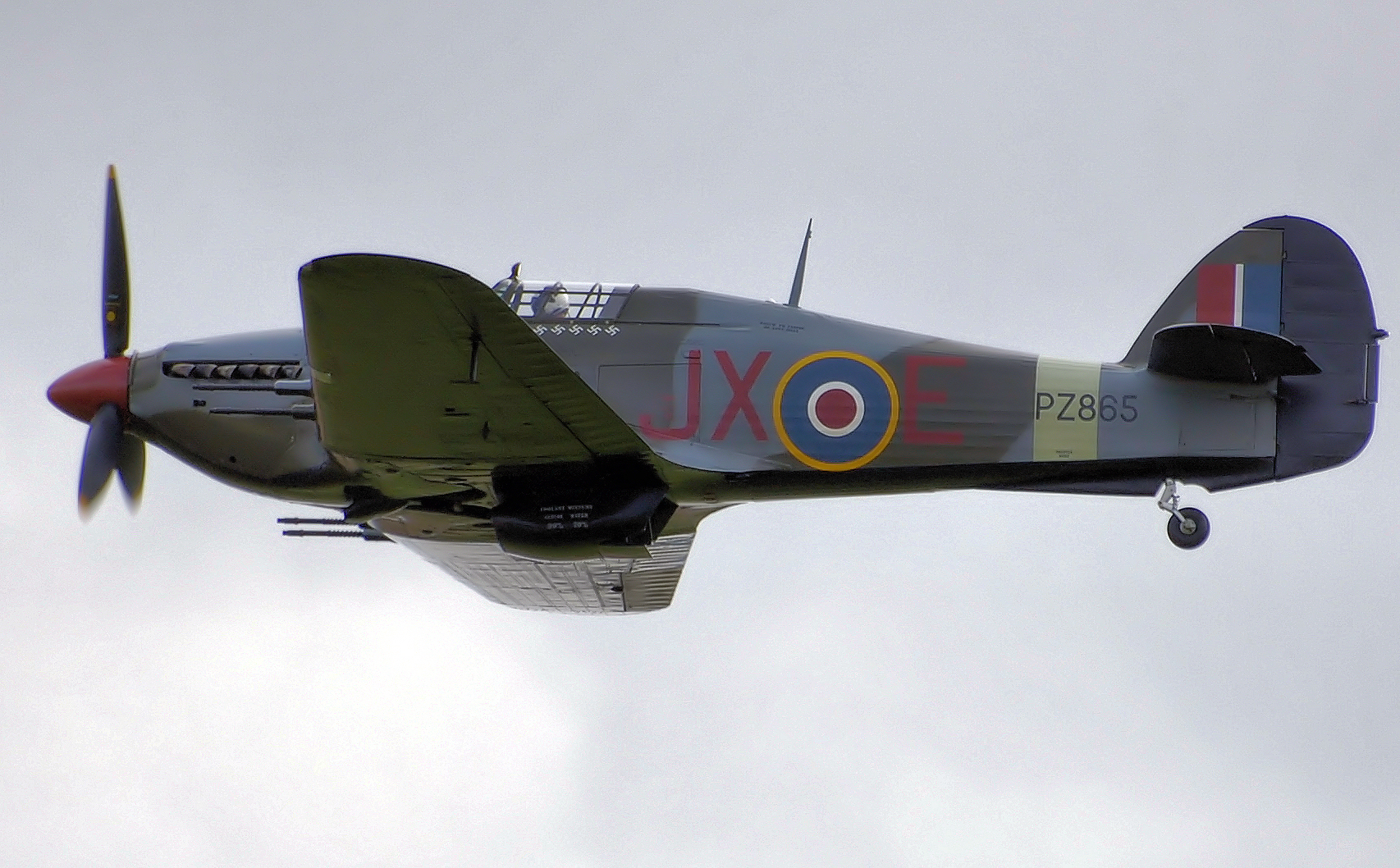
The last of the 14,583 Hurricanes built, s/n PZ865. A Mk.IIc version, originally known as "The Last of the Many" and owned by Hawker, this aircraft is now flown by the Battle of Britain Memorial Flight.

Of more than 14,483 Hurricanes that were built, approximately 16 (including three Sea Hurricanes) are in airworthy condition worldwide, although many other non-flying examples survive in various air museums.

== Specifications (Hurricane Mk.IIC) ==
3-view line drawing of the Hawker Hurricane

Data from Jane's Fighting Aircraft of World War II

General characteristics

- Crew: One
- Length: 32 ft 3 in (9.83 m)
- Wingspan: 40 ft 0 in (12.19 m)
- Height: 13 ft 1.5 in (4.001 m)
- Wing area: 257.5 sq ft (23.92 m^{2})
- Airfoil: root: Clark YH (19%); tip: Clark YH (12.2%)
- Empty weight: 5,745 lb (2,606 kg)
- Gross weight: 7,670 lb (3,479 kg)
- Max takeoff weight: 8,710 lb (3,951 kg)
- Powerplant: 1 × Rolls-Royce Merlin XX V-12 liquid-cooled piston engine, 1,185 hp (884 kW) at 21,000 ft (6,400 m)
- Propellers: 3-bladed

Performance

- Maximum speed: 340 mph (550 km/h, 300 kn) at 21,000 ft (6,400 m)
- Range: 600 mi (970 km, 520 nmi)
- Service ceiling: 36,000 ft (11,000 m)
- Rate of climb: 2,780 ft/min (14.1 m/s)
- Wing loading: 29.8 lb/sq ft (145 kg/m^{2})
- Power/mass: 0.15 hp/lb (0.25 kW/kg)

Armament

- Guns: 4 × 20 mm (0.79 in) Hispano Mk II cannon
- Bombs: 2 × 250 or 500 lb (110 or 230 kg) bombs

== Turn performance ==
Although the Hawker Hurricane did not have the speed or climb rate of the Supermarine Spitfires or the Messerschmitt Bf 109, its lower wing loading meant that it was able to turn in a tighter circle, an important advantage in some phases of fighter combat. It has sometimes been claimed the Bf 109 could turn inside the Hurricane, a matter considered below.

=== Significance ===
Fighter aircraft have been classified into turn performance and energy performance types; the latter have higher speeds and can climb faster; but the former have better instantaneous turn, and a tighter sustained turn radius.

From the early 1930s onwards, in what aeronautical engineer Georg Hans Madelung called the "speed craze", fighter designers prioritised maximum speeds and climb rates. Not until much later was there a general requirement for a better balance of performance, reducing wing loads to get extra agility in the turn.

In the Battle of Britain the Hurricanes were assigned to a defensive role, i.e., they were encouraged to seek out enemy bombers, not fighters. The bombers were escorted by fighters, often Messerschmitt Bf 109s or Bf 110s, whose task, therefore, was to attack any incoming Hurricanes. A standard fighter manouevre, taught to most fighter pilots, was to attack from astern, preferably by ambush from above. If the attacker was not seen coming in and could get close enough, the result was probably a victory. If, however, he was seen in time, the basic evasive manouevre was the break, in which the defending aircraft turned hard in the direction of the attacker, if possible getting onto his tail.

Wrote Pilot Officer Geoffrey Page:

In the Hurricane we knew that the Me 109 could out-dive us, but not out-turn us. With that knowledge, one obviously used the turning manouevre rather than trying to beat the man at the game in which he was clearly superior. With a 109 sitting behind you, you'd stay in a really tight turn, and after a few turns the position would be reversed and you'd be on his tail.

=== Turning radius of Hurricane and other Battle of Britain fighters ===
An aircraft's minimum turning radius cannot be quoted as a single number since it varies with altitude and loading. Accurate historical data are sparse because they were not published at the time, presumably for security reasons, or later for lack of archival research.

In May 1940 a Messerschmitt Bf 109E3 captured by French forces was tested against a Hurricane, both flown by British pilots. The pilots reported that the Messerschmitt was faster than the Hurricane, and could out-climb and out-dive it, but could not turn as well. In climbing and diving turns at high speed, although the Bf 109 was placed line astern to start with, it could not keep the Hurricane in its gunsights and the latter was able to get onto its tail in only four turns. However, these trials were restricted to below 15,000 feet owing to lack of oxygen equipment.

Likewise, an RAF Fighter Command report stated that "the Hurricane will easily out-turn the Spitfire in a simple tailchase, and bring guns to bear in two or three turns".

However in 1967, in The Hawker Hurricane I (Profile Publications, No. 111, an 18-page booklet), aviation author Francis K. Mason wrote:

Much has been written of the relative manouevrability of the four principal Battle of Britain fighters. Published here for the first time are comparative turning radii attainable, resolved to a combat altitude of 10,000 feet—the most common area of combat chosen by the Hurricane pilots in 1940 ... if and when the choice was theirs. True airspeed, 300 m.p.h.

| | C_{L} | 1/2 ρ v^{2} | Wing loading at half-fuel weight | "Available g" | Turning Radius |
|---|---|---|---|---|---|
| Hurricane I | 1.0 | 170 | 22 lb./sq. ft. | 7.5 | 800 feet |
| Spitfire I | 1.0 | 170 | 24 lb./sq. ft. | 7.0 | 880 feet |
| Bf 109E | 1.0 | 170 | 25 lb./sq. ft. | 8.1 | 750 feet |
| Bf 110C | 1.0 | 170 | 32 lb./sq. ft. | 5.2 | 1,210 feet |

Mason did not state his sources. His numbers were repeated in Len Deighton's 1977 book Fighter, achieving wider publicity. They were criticised by Ackroyd and Lamont of the Aerospace department of Manchester University, who said Mason had arrived at them by calculation, which calculations were flawed.

According to them, to arrive at those values Mason had assumed the aircraft were flown at 300 m.p.h. while in a sustained angle of bank so steep - about 80° - that the g forces would have been "beyond the limits of any pilot at that time and most probably beyond the structural limits of the aircraft". Further, none of the aircraft engines could have delivered the required thrust, since far more power is required to overcome aircraft drag in a very steep turn.

Recalculating for thrusts actually achievable with those engines, and assuming the aircraft were flown at maximum power as near to the stall as possible, again at 10,000 feet, Ackroyd and Lamont arrived at the following among other parameter values:

| | n (≅"available g") | Angle of bank | Turning radius |
|---|---|---|---|
| Hurricane I (Late) | 2.80 | 69.1° | 202 m (663 ft) |
| Spitfire IA | 2.74 | 68.6° | 209 m (686 ft) |
| Messerschmitt Bf109E-3 | 2.67 | 68.0° | 260 m (853 ft) |
| Messerschmitt Bf 110C-4 | 2.64 | 67.8° | 256 m (840) ft) |

They accepted those were still only estimates, but believed them to provide a reasonable assessment. They said they tended to be confirmed by a contemporaneous flight report on a captured Bf109 E-3.

== See also ==
- Flying Legend Hawker Hurricane Replica
- Hawker Hurricane in Yugoslav service

Related development

- Hawker Hotspur

Aircraft of comparable role, configuration, and era

- Macchi C.200 Saetta
- Miles M.20
- Morane-Saulnier M.S.406
- Reggiane Re.2001 Falco II
- Rogožarski IK-3
- Yakovlev Yak-1

Related lists

- List of aircraft of the United Kingdom in World War II
- List of aircraft of World War II
- List of fighter aircraft
- List of most-produced aircraft
