= List of Air Ministry specifications =

This is a partial list of the British Air Ministry (AM) specifications for aircraft. A specification stemmed from an Operational Requirement, abbreviated "OR", describing what the aircraft would be used for. This in turn led to the specification itself, e.g. a two-engined fighter with four machine guns. So for example, OR.40 for a heavy bomber led to Specification B.12/36. Aircraft manufacturers would be invited to present design proposals to the ministry, following which prototypes of one or more of the proposals might be ordered for evaluation. On very rare occasions, a manufacturer would design and build an aircraft using their own money as a "private venture" (PV). This would then be offered to the ministry for evaluation. The ministry may well release a specification based on the private venture aircraft if the plane aroused interest from the RAF or the ministry due to its performance or some other combination of features.

The system of producing aircraft to a specification ran from 1920 to 1949 during which the Air Ministry was replaced by first the Ministry of Aircraft Production (MAP) in 1940 and then the Ministry of Supply (MoS) in 1946. The system was applied to commercial aircraft as well, two being the de Havilland Comet and Vickers Viscount. During the period, over 800 specifications were issued.

== Specification designations ==
Each specification name usually followed a pattern. A leading letter was usually present to identify the aircraft purpose. The codes used included B for "heavy bomber", e.g., B.12/36, P for "medium bomber", e.g., P.13/36, F for "fighter", e., F.10/35, and A for "army co-operation", e., A.39/34. The second part was a number identifying it in sequence and then after the slash, the year it was formulated, so in the example given above, B.12/36 signifies a specification for a heavy bomber, the twelfth specification of all types issued in 1936. Specifications were not always issued in sequence.

Admiralty specifications were identified by the letter N (Naval), e., N.21/45, and experimental specifications identified by the letter E (Experimental), e., E.28/39, with training aircraft signified by the letter T (Training), e., T.23/31, and unpowered aircraft, signified by the letter X, e., X.26/40. The letter G (General) signified a general-purpose aircraft, e.g., G.9/45, with an M (Multi-role) being applied to aircraft intended for more than one specific purpose, e.g., M.15/35.

The letter C (Cargo) was applied to military transport aircraft, e.g., C.1/42, with the letter O (Observation) used for a naval reconnaissance aircraft, e.g., O.8/38 – the letter S (Spotter) used for the more specialised role of naval spotting, i.e., observing and reporting back the fall of naval gunfire, e.g., S.38/34 – and R (Reconnaissance) for a reconnaissance type – often a flying boat, e.g., R.3/33. Special purpose aircraft would be signified by a letter Q, this being used to specify aircraft such as target-tugs, radio-controlled target drones, etc., e.g., Q.32/55.

Sometimes the purpose for which an aircraft is used in service would change from that for which the specification to which it was designed was issued, and so there are some discrepancies and inconsistencies in designation, the Royal Navy in particular liking to specify multiple roles for its aircraft in an attempt to make the best use of the necessarily limited hangar space onboard its aircraft carriers. In this case this resulted in several types designed to specifications originally intended to signify the naval Spotting role also being used for other purposes, e.g., S.15/33, resulting in the Blackburn Shark and Fairey Swordfish, the latter aircraft being primarily utilised as a torpedo bomber. Similarly S.24/37, which produced the Fairey Barracuda, again primarily designed for spotting, the dive bomber/torpedo bomber requirements being regarded as secondary when the specification was issued, but for which roles it was almost exclusively subsequently used, the original spotting requirement having been made obsolete with the introduction of radar.

In addition, some (mostly early) specifications appear to have no letter prefix at all, e.g., 1/21, the Vickers Virginia III.

== List of specifications (incomplete) ==
The names of the aircraft shown in the table are not necessarily those they carried when provided for evaluation as at this point an aircraft would usually be referred to as the Manufacturer X.XX/XX, e.g., the Avro B.35/46 – this is in addition to the manufacturer's own separate internal designation for the aircraft, e.g., Avro 698. With several manufacturers submitting designs to the same specification this could result in a number of different aircraft with the same X.XX/XX designation, e.g., Handley Page B.35/46, etc. Upon acceptance of the design(s) the final service names would usually be chosen by the Air Ministry when they placed a production order, in the above B.35/46 cases, where two aircraft were accepted to this specification, Vulcan and Victor respectively.

Upon entering service, in the absence of any already-planned variants a new type would initially have no mark number after the aircraft name, being simply referred to as the Manufacturer Service-name, e.g., the Avro Anson, however upon acceptance of a new variant the previous (initial) version automatically became the 'Mark I', so in the example given, the previous (first) version of the Anson retrospectively became the Avro Anson Mk I upon acceptance of an Avro Anson Mk II. Sometimes planned variants would be later cancelled leading to 'missing' mark numbers, or the extent of the changes may have justified given the new variant a completely new name, e.g., the Hawker Typhoon II subsequently becoming the Hawker Tempest, or the Avro Lancaster B.IV & B.V entering service as the Avro Lincoln. In a few cases the same aircraft ordered with differing engines would be allocated separate names for each variant, e.g., Hawker Typhoon and Hawker Tornado, or the Handley Page Hampden and Handley Page Hereford. Typographical designation of mark numbers (Mk.) varied over time and inconsistencies are common, e.g., Mark II, Mk. II, II, etc. Initially Roman numerals were used, changing to Arabic numerals post-World War II, e.g., Supermarine Spitfire Mk I to Supermarine Spitfire Mk 24.

Note 1: where possible mark numbers are given here in this list in the form that was used at the time of acceptance. Variations may be encountered due to changes in format/typographical convention.

Note 2: due to mergers and amalgamations within the UK aircraft industry sometimes the name of the manufacturer changed over time, e.g., English Electric later became part of the British Aircraft Corporation (BAC), so the English Electric Lightning then became the BAC Lightning; the British Aircraft Corporation itself and Hawker Siddeley (HS) then later merged and became British Aerospace, subsequently becoming BAe (now BAE Systems). Thus the previously mentioned Avro Vulcan was subsequently referred to as the Hawker Siddeley Vulcan; similarly, the Blackburn Buccaneer later became the Hawker Siddeley Buccaneer. Where possible, for clarity the aircraft in this list are listed under the ORIGINATING company's name or the name of the manufacturer under which it first entered production.

Specifications within the tables are listed in numerical order by year of issue; where a given number appears more than once, with one or more letter prefixes, the entries are presented in alphabetical order.

=== Air Board specifications (1917–1918) ===
In 1917, the Air Board began to issue specifications for new aircraft on behalf of the Royal Flying Corps and Royal Navy Air Service, with separate series for the RFC and Navy.

RFC series
Spec	Type	Designs
A.1A	Single-seat fighter – Sopwith Camel replacement	Austin Osprey, Boulton & Paul Bobolink, Nieuport B.N.1, Sopwith Snipe
A.1C	Single-seat fighter – ABC Dragonfly engine, became RAF Type I specification.	Nieuport Nighthawk
A.2B	Single- or twin-engined day bomber	Airco DH.10 Amiens
A.3C	Heavy bomber – superseded by RAF Type V	Abandoned

Royal Navy Air Service series
Spec	Type	Designs
N.1A	Single seat land or ship-based fighter.	Beardmore W.B.IV, Beardmore W.B.V, Mann Egerton Type H
N.1B	Single-seat seaplane or flying boat fighter	Blackburn N.1B, Norman Thompson N.1B, Supermarine Baby, Westland N.1B, Wight Triplane Flying Boat
N.1B	Single seat torpedo bomber	Blackburn Blackburd, Short Shirl
N.2A	Two-seat floatplane scout	Fairey N.9, Fairey N.10, Short N.2A
N.2B	Two-seat floatplane bomber, 600 lb (270 kg) bombload.	Fairey IIIB, Short N.2B
N.2C	Twin engined patrol flying boat	Norman Thompson N.2C

=== RAF specifications (1918–1920) ===
Data from: The British Aircraft Specifications File

Spec	Type	Designs
Type I	Fighter, ABC Dragonfly engine.	Armstrong Whitworth Ara, BAT Basilisk, Nieuport Nighthawk, Siddeley Siskin, Sopwith Snapper, Sopwith Snark
Type IA	Long-distance (high altitude)	BAT Bantam, Westland Wagtail
Type II	Two-seat fighter	Bristol Badger
Type III	Two-seat fighter	Austin Greyhound, Westland Weasel
Type IV; Type VI	Twin-engined bomber	Avro 533 Manchester, Boulton Paul Bourges, de Havilland DH.11 Oxford, Sopwith Cobham
Type VII	Night Bomber	Nieuport London
Type VIII	Bomber	Avro 533 Manchester, Boulton Paul Bourges, Bristol Braemar, de Havilland DH.11 Oxford, Sopwith Cobham
Type IX	Medium bomber	de Havilland Okapi
Type XI	Heavy bomber	Siddeley Sinaia
Type XX		Gloster Nightjar
Type XXI	Two-seat amphibian fighter	Bristol Type 35, Fairey Pintail
Type XXII	Single-seat carrier based torpedo bomber (re-issued 1920)	Blackburn Blackburd, Short Shirl, 'Blackburn Swift'
Type XXX	Flying boat	Short Cromarty, Vickers Valentia
Type XXXII	Prototype training seaplane	(cancelled 1918) – Short Sporting Type produced to this specification
Type XXXIII	Four-engined long range flying boat	Fairey N.4

=== 1920–1929 ===
Data from: The British Aircraft Specifications File

Spec	OR	Type	Designs
1/20	None	First spec. issued: spares carrier	Bristol Type 37 Tramp
2/20		'Interim' single-engine heavy bomber	Avro Aldershot, de Havilland DH.27 Derby
3/20		Single-seat deck-landing torpedo-carrier – Spec. superseded by 32/22 (q.v.)	Blackburn Dart (modified), Handley Page H.P.19 Hanley
4/20		Long-distance photographic and reconnaissance aeroplane	Boulton & Paul Bolton
5/20		Troop Carrier Biplane	Bristol Type 56, Vickers Victoria
6/20		Vimy Ambulance	Vickers Vimy Ambulance
7/20		Fleet reconnaissance and fleet spotting amphibian	Supermarine Seal II
8/20		Three-seat reconnaissance aircraft for Army/Navy	Armstrong Whitworth Tadpole, Westland Walrus
9/20		Medium range postal monoplane	Parnall Possum, Boulton & Paul Bodmin
10/20		Cantilever monoplane	de Havilland Doncaster
11/20		Medium Range Military Conversion of Postal Aeroplane	Parnall Possum, Boulton & Paul Bodmin
1/21		Long-range bomber – Vickers Vimy replacement	Vickers Virginia III
2/21		Experimental single-seat convertible biplane/monoplane fighter/interceptor/two-seat reconnaissance-fighter aircraft – written for Bullfinch	Bristol Bullfinch
3/21		Naval Fleet spotter/reconnaissance aircraft	Avro Bison, Blackburn Blackburn
4/21		Small troop carrier	Vickers Vernon
5/21		Light day bomber – Airco DH.9A replacement	Fairey Fawn
6/21		Postal aeroplane	Westland Dreadnought
7/21		Single-Seat Ship Fighter	Parnall Plover
8/21		Torpedo aeroplane	Blackburn T.4 Cubaroo
9/21		Torpedo aeroplane	Blackburn Dart production
10/21		Corps reconnaissance aircraft	Armstrong Whitworth Wolf, Hawker Duiker
11/21		Vimy ambulance	Vickers Vimy ambulance
12/21		Fleet spotting flying boat	English Electric Ayr
13/21		Cantilever Monoplane	Handley Page H.P.20
14/21		Felixstowe F.5 replacement	Supermarine Scylla
13/21		Cantilever monoplane	Handley Page H.P.20
14/21		Boat seaplane	Supermarine Scylla
15/21		Twin-engined bomber	Boulton & Paul P.19
16/21		Biplane transport	Handley Page W.8b
17/21		Biplane transport	Handley Page Type X, de Havilland DH.34
18/21		Passenger transport	Handley Page HP.18 Hanley / Handley Page HP.21 Hanley, de Havilland DH.32, Vickers Type 61 Vulcan
19/21		Two-seat reconnaissance aircraft – Bristol F.2B Fighter replacement	Short Springbok
20/21		High-altitude fighter	cancelled
21/21		Spotting amphibian	Supermarine Seagull II
22/21		Reconditioned F.2b	Bristol F.2b Fighter
1/22		Passenger Aeroplane	Vickers Type 170 Vanguard
2/22		Amphibians for use in the Middle East	Vickers Viking V
3/22		Two-seat fighter/reconnaissance powered by a supercharged engine – Bristol Fighter replacement	Bristol Type 84 Bloodhound
4/22		Reconditioning of DH.10	Airco DH.10 Amiens
5/22		Spare wing	de Havilland DH.29 Doncaster
6/22		Naval carrier fighter with interchangeable wheel and float undercarriages using Armstrong Siddeley Jaguar or Bristol Jupiter engine – Nieuport Nightjar replacement	Fairey Flycatcher, Parnall Plover
7/22		Army reconnaissance aircraft	Hawker Duiker
8/22		Corps reconnaissance aircraft	Armstrong Whitworth Wolf
9/22		New tail unit and trial	de Havilland DH.29 Doncaster
10/22		Metal-winged DH.9a	Airco DH.9a
11/22		Reconditioning of DH.9a	Airco DH.9a
12/22		Single-engined goods carrier	Vickers Type 63 Vulcan
13/22		Reconditioning of Snipe	Sopwith Snipe
14/22		High performance landplane	Armstrong Whitworth Siskin III
15/22		Modifications to Hanley	Handley Page HP.19 Hanley II
16/22		Long range torpedo bomber to carry 21 inch torpedo	Blackburn Cubaroo, Avro 557 Ava
17/22		Amphibian floatplane	Not proceeded with
18/22		Amphibian seaplane	Not proceeded with
19/22		Night bombing landplane	Not proceeded with
20/22		Coast patrol seaplane	English Electric P.5 Cork
21/22		Twin-engined amphibian flying boat for civil operations – see also R.18/24	Supermarine Swan
22/22		Two-seat fighter/reconnaissance powered by a supercharged engine – Bloodhound three aircraft order – revised from 3/22 (q.v.)	Bristol Type 84 Bloodhound
23/22		Amphibian floatplane	Not proceeded with
24/22		Amphibian seaplane	Not proceeded with
25/22		Single-seat night interceptor fighter	Hawker Woodcock
26/22		Cantilever Monoplane for Civil Purposes	Not proceeded with
27/22		Three-engined Mail Carrying Landplane	Not proceeded with
28/22		Rebuilding and Modification of the Doncaster	De Havilland DH.29 Doncaster
29/22		Postal Monoplane	Westland Dreadnought
30/22			Boulton & Paul Bugle
B.30/22		Heavy bomber – written for Bugle II production order but Sidestrand also apparently designed to this spec.	Boulton & Paul Bugle II, Boulton Paul Sidestrand
31/22		Four-seat heavy night-bomber	Handley Page Hyderabad
32/22		Single-seat deck-landing torpedo-carrier – Spec. supersedes 3/20 (q.v.)	Blackburn Dart II, Bristol Brandon
37/22		Three-seat deck landing reconnaissance aircraft – Blackburn Blackburn / Avro Bison replacement	Avro Type 550, Blackburn Airedale, Hawker Hedgehog
38/22		General purpose seaplane/landplane	Fairey IIID
40/22		Transport aeroplane – civil airliner – larger version of de Havilland DH.34	de Havilland Highclere
41/22		'Middle East type transport aeroplane' – civil airliner	Armstrong Whitworth Argosy, de Havilland Hercules
43/22			Vickers Vernon II
44/22		Single-engined long-range reconnaissance seaplane – intended for round-the-World flight	Fairey Fremantle
46/22		Three-seat fleet-spotter amphibian	Vickers Vanellus
9/23		Superseded by 14/24	Blackburn Iris
13/23			Supermarine Seagull II
16/23	None	Spotting ship-plane	Avro Bison
19/23		Fighter/interceptor – improved Siskin III	Armstrong Whitworth Siskin IIIA
21/23		Fleet two-seat torpedo bomber	Avro Buffalo, Blackburn Ripon, Handley Page H.P.31 Harrow
23/23		Coastal patrol and anti-submarine flying-boat	English Electric Kingston
25/23		Fleet two-seat torpedo bomber/bomber	Handley Page H.P.25 Hendon
26/23		Two-seat long-range day-bomber	Bristol Berkeley, Handley Page H.P.28 Handcross, Hawker Horsley, Westland Yeovil
28/23		Long-range bomber – Virginia production order	Vickers Virginia
37/23		Single-engined fighter/interceptor – improved Grebe	Gloster Gamecock
38/23		Twin-engined Night Bombing Landplane	Vickers Vimy
39/23		Single-engined Single-Seater Racing Seaplane	Gloster II
40/23		Single-engined Single-Seater Racing Seaplane	Supermarine S.4
41/23		Fitting of Handley Page Slotted Wings to the Bristol Fighter Aircraft	Bristol F.2B
42/23		Amphibian Alighting Gear for Fairy Flycatcher I	Fairey Flycatcher
43/23		Special Wings to Aerofoil Section of R&M 322 for Blackburn Dart	Blackburn Dart
44/23		Light Aeroplane	De Havilland DH.53 Humming Bird
45/23		Two-seater Fighter Reconnaissance Landplane	Vickers Venture
1/24		Three-seat fleet reconnaissance seaplane and amphibian	Parnall Pike, Short S.6 Sturgeon, Bristol Type 87
2/24		Light aeroplane	Cancelled
3/24		Single-seat high-performance landplane	Hawker Woodcock II (production)
4/24		"Twin-Engined Home Defence Fighter" armed with two 37 mm cannons	Westland Westbury Bristol Bagshot
5/24		Advanced landplane, convertible to a seaplane, trainer for RAF and deck-landing trainer for FAA	Cancelled, replaced by 5A/24
5A/24		Floatplane trainer	Vickers Vendace, Blackburn Sprat, Parnall Perch
6/24		Single-seat fighter	Fairey Flycatcher (production)
7/24		'High powered single-seater fighter landplane'	Avro Avenger, Fairey Firefly I, Fairey Fox, Gloster Gorcock, Hawker Hornbill
8/24		Army co-operation aircraft	de Havilland Dingo
9/24		Twin engine medium day-bomber – Sidestrand II production order – see also 25/27	Boulton Paul Sidestrand II
10/24		Fleet spotting ship-plane	Blackburn Blackburn
11/24		Fleet spotting ship-plane	Avro Bison II
12/24		Long-range bomber – Virginia production order	Vickers Virginia
13/24		Patrol flying boat	Blackburn Iris III, Short Singapore
14/24		Three-engined boat seaplane	Blackburn Iris, Saunders Valkyrie
15/24		Four-seat heavy night-bomber – initial production batch of Hyderabads	Handley Page Hyderabad I
16/24		Submarine-borne reconnaissance seaplane	Parnall Peto
17/24		Single-seat high-speed fighter landplane	Gloster Guan
18/24		Twin-engined amphibian flying boat – military version of boat ordered to 21/22	Supermarine Southampton
19/24		Three-seat spotter/reconnaissance (Fleet Air Arm)/two-seat GP (Royal Air Force) aircraft with interchangeable land & float U/C and folding wings	Fairey IIIF
20/24		All-metal monoplane flying boat	Beardmore Inverness
21/24		Single-seat boat seaplane for storage in restricted space	Parnall Prawn
22/24		Three-engine boat seaplane	Saunders Valkyrie
23/24		Twin engine civil airliner	Handley Page H.P.32 Hamlet
24/24		Conversion of Bison I to Bison Ia	Avro Bison
25/24		Single-seater, high-speed fighter landplane	Hawker Heron
26/24		Three-engined land-plane for duties in the Middle East	Cancelled
27/24		Twin engine single-seat interceptor/night fighter	Boulton Paul Bittern
28/24		Day and night fighter – Armstrong Whitworth Siskin replacement	Armstrong Whitworth Starling
29/24		Twin-engined boat amphibian with Lynx engines (service aircraft)	Supermarine Seamew
30/24		Two-seat reconnaissance/army co-operation aircraft	de Havilland Hyena, Short Chamois, Vickers Vespa
31/24		Twin-engined boat amphibian with Lynx engines (civil aircraft)	Saunders Medina
32/24		Training landplane with Lynx engines – replaced by 3/27	Avro 504N
33/24		Three-engined boat seaplane for civil use	Not issued
34/24		Freight carrying landplane	Vickers Vellore, Gloucester Goodwood
35/24		Three-engine landplane for Middle East transport	Armstrong Whitworth Argosy
11/25		Reconnaissance flying boat	Supermarine Southampton (production)
12/25		Two-seater fleet reconnaissance aircraft	Cancelled
13/25		Troop carrier	Vickers Victoria III (production)
14/25		Demonstration flight of Cierva Autogiro	Cierva C.6A
17/25		Naval single-seater fighter of all-metal stressed-skin construction with interchangeable wheel and float U/C powered by Lynx engine	Avro 584 Avocet, Vickers Vireo
20/25		Army co-operation aeroplane – Bristol Fighter/DH.9A replacement	Armstrong Whitworth Atlas, Bristol Boarhound
23/25		Two-seat day-bomber, reconnaissance & coastal torpedo-bomber	Blackburn Beagle, Gloster Goring, Handley Page H.P.34 Hare, Hawker Harrier, Westland Witch
24/25		High altitude bomber – Hawker Horsley replacement	Blackburn Beagle, Handley Page H.P.34 Hare, Vickers Vildebeest
7/26		Twin-float high-speed monoplane seaplane for 1927 Schneider Trophy competition	Short Crusader
F.9/26	None	Day and night 'zone' fighter – no design accepted and Spec. superseded by F.20/27 (q.v.)	Armstrong Whitworth Starling II, Blackburn Blackcock / Turcock, Boulton Paul Partridge, Bristol Bulldog Mk.I, Bristol Bullpup, Gloster Goldfinch, Gloster SS.18, Hawker Hawfinch, Vickers Type 141
10/26		Long-range bomber – Virginia production order	Vickers Virginia
12/26		Fast two-seat day bomber of all-metal construction using Rolls-Royce F.XIB engine	Avro Antelope, Hawker Hart, Fairey Fox IIM
14/26		Passenger flying boat	Short Calcutta
21/26		Naval Fleet fighter – see also N.21/26	Parnall Pipit, Vickers Type 141, Vickers Type 177
N.21/26		Naval Fleet fighter – see also 21/26	Armstrong Whitworth Starling II, Armstrong Whitworth A.W.16, Blackburn Blackcock/Turcock, Fairey Firefly III, Gloster Gnatsnapper, Hawker Hoopoe, Vickers Type 177
O.22/26		Naval high-speed, two-seat, Fleet fighter/reconnaissance	Blackburn Nautilus, Fairey Fleetwing, Handley Page H.P.37F, Hawker Osprey, Short Gurnard
R.4/27		Maritime patrol flying boat	Saunders Severn
R.5/27		Reconnaissance flying boat	Blackburn Sydney
8/27		Long-range bomber – Virginia production order	Vickers Virginia
F.10/27		Single-seat fighter armed with six machine guns	Saunders A.10
B.19/27		Twin engine night-bomber – Virginia/Hinaidi replacement – Hendon winner but introduction delayed so runner-up (Heyford) accepted	Avro 557 Ava, Fairey Hendon, Handley Page Heyford, Vickers Type 150, Vickers Type 163, Vickers Type 195, Vickers Type 225, Bristol Type 108
C.20/27		Transport version of Handley Page Hyderabad / Handley Page Hinaidi – Chitral/Clive	Handley Page Clive
F.20/27		'Interception single-seat fighter' to overtake in shortest time an enemy aircraft flying at 150 mph at 20,000 ft	Armstrong Whitworth Starling II, Bristol Bulldog Mk.II, de Havilland DH.77, Fairey Firefly II, Hawker Fury, Saunders A.10, Vickers Jockey, Westland Interceptor
B.22/27		Three engine night-bomber – abandoned due to delays and replaced by B.19/27 (q.v.)	Boulton Paul P.32, de Havilland DH.72 Canberra
25/27		Twin engine medium day-bomber – Sidestrand II production order – see also 9/24	Boulton Paul Sidestrand II
26/27		General purpose aircraft – D.H.9A replacement	Bristol Beaver, de Havilland Hound, Fairey Ferret, Gloster Goral, Vickers 131 Valiant, Vickers Venture, Vickers Vixen, Westland Wapiti
F.29/27		Fighter utilizing a 37 mm cannon from Coventry Ordnance Works to meet similar requirements as F.20/27	Vickers Type 161, Westland C.O.W. Gun Fighter, Bristol Type 112
33/27		'Postal Aircraft' – experimental very-long range aeroplane for world distance-record attempt	Fairey Long-range Monoplane
M.5/28		Torpedo bomber – Spec superseded by M.1/30 (q.v.)	Handley Page H.P.41
R.6/28		Patrol/reconnaissance flying boat	Short Sarafand
8/28		Racing seaplane for 1929 Schneider Trophy using Rolls-Royce R engine, for use by RAF High Speed Flight	Supermarine S.6
13/28		Long-range bomber – Virginia production order	Vickers Virginia
C.16/28		Bomber-transport capable of carrying 30 fully armed troops, or their equivalent in cargo or bombs, for a distance of 1,200 mi (1,900 km) nonstop	Gloster TC.33, Handley Page H.P.43, Vickers Type 163, Bristol Type 115, Bristol Type 116
F.17/28		Bulldog II production order	Bristol Bulldog Mk.II
21/28		High-speed mailplane for Imperial Airways	Boulton & Paul Mailplane, Boulton Paul P.71A
1/29		General purpose aircraft (for production)	Westland Wapiti
2/29		Two-seat carrier-borne torpedo-bomber (for production)	Blackburn Ripon IIA
3/29		Troop transport aircraft	Handley Page Clive II
4/29		Ab initio trainer – Moth with de Havilland Gipsy I order	de Havilland Gipsy Moth
5/29		Elementary trainer (for production)	Hawker Tomtit
6/29		General purpose landplane	Blackburn C.A.15C, Boulton & Paul P.42, Westland Limousine V
7/29		Troop carrying aeroplane (for production)	Vickers Victoria V
8/29		Single-seat fighter (for production)	Armstrong Whitworth Siskin IIIA
9/29		Day bomber (for production)	Hawker Hart
10/29		Medium day-bomber (for production)	Boulton Paul Sidestrand III
11/29		Day and night fighter (for production)	Bristol Bulldog IIA
12/29		Spotter reconnaissance aeroplane for the Fleet Air Arm (for production)	Fairey IIIF
13/29		Heavy night-bomber (for production)	Handley Page Hinaidi II
14/29		Army co-operation aircraft	Cancelled
15/29		General purpose aircraft	Cancelled
16/29		Experimental tailless aircraft	Westland-Hill Pterodactyl IV
17/29		All-metal torpedo-bomber (for development and production)	Hawker Horsley
18/29		General reconnaissance flying boat – military version of Short S.8 Calcutta	Short Rangoon

=== 1930–1939 ===
Spec	OR	Type	Designs
M.1/30		Torpedo bomber – Spec. supersedes M5/28 (q.v.)	Blackburn M.1/30, Handley Page H.P.46, Vickers Type 207
2/30		Dual control conversion set issued to Blackburn but then cancelled	
3/30		Basic trainer – Avro 504N replacement	Avro Type 621 Trainer
5/30		Mail carrier	Vickers Type 166 Vellore II
6/30		ab initio trainer – Lynx-Avro (Avro 504N) production order	Avro 504N
F.7/30	OR.1	Fighter capable of at least 250 mph and armed with four machine guns	Blackburn F.3, Bristol Type 123, Bristol Type 133, Gloster Gladiator, Gloster SS.19, Hawker P.V.3, Supermarine Type 224, Westland F.7/30
8/30		ab initio trainer – Moth with Gypsy II order	de Havilland Moth
S.9/30		Two-seat carrier-borne torpedo bomber/three-seat spotter-reconnaissance aircraft	Fairey T.S.R.I, Gloster FS.36; see also S.15/33
16/30		Naval fighter – written for Nimrod	Hawker Nimrod
18/30		Fairey IIIF replacement	Fairey Gordon I
19/30		Naval fighter/reconnaissance with folding wings and interchangeable wheel/float U/C	Hawker Osprey
G.4/31	OR.2	General-purpose/torpedo bomber – Wapiti & Gordon replacement – Wellesley one of two designs submitted by Vickers and itself a PV – see also G.22/35	Blackburn B-7, Bristol Type 120, Fairey G.4/31, Handley Page H.P.47, Hawker P.V.4, Parnall G.4/31, Vickers G.4/31, Vickers Wellesley, Westland PV-7
5/31		Long-range bomber – Virginia production order	Vickers Virginia
13/31		ab initio trainer with complete freedom for parachute escape by both occupants – D.H.60T accepted with modifications, becoming D.H.82 – see also T.23/31 (some sources give 13/31 as an order for the Ripon IIC)	Avro Type 631 Cadet, de Havilland D.H. 60T Tiger Moth
18/31		Basic trainer – Avro Type 621 Trainer with Lynx engine	Avro Tutor
R.19/31		Three-engined long-range reconnaissance flying boat – Rangoon three-aircraft production order	Short Rangoon
R.20/31		Twin-engined flying boat – all-metal Kestrel-engined Southampton II (Southampton IV/Scapa)	Supermarine Scapa
T.23/31		Tiger Moth I production order	de Havilland Tiger Moth I
R.24/31	OR.3	"General Purpose Open Sea Patrol Flying Boat"	Saunders Roe London, Short R.24/31 Knuckleduster, Supermarine Stranraer
C.26/31	OR.4	Bomber-transport – Valentia replacement	Armstrong Whitworth A.W.23, Bristol Bombay, Handley Page H.P.51. Supermarine Type 231 – (not built)
B.9/32	OR.5	Twin-engine medium day bomber with appreciably higher performance than predecessors – later revised to specify Goshawk power and subsequently re-revised with Goshawk requirement dropped	Vickers Wellington (renamed from 'Crecy'), Handley Page Hampden, Bristol Type 131
S.11/32	OR.6	Naval catapult observation/spotting seaplane for carriage on cruisers	Fairey Seafox
T.12/32		Trainer	Bristol Type 124
19/32		Conversion of Westland Wapiti into Westland Wallace standard	Westland Wallace
20/32		Three-engined long-range reconnaissance flying boat – improved Iris with Buzzard engines	Blackburn Perth
25/32		Basic trainer – revised-Tutor production order	Avro Tutor I
B.23/32		Twin-engine medium bomber – written for Heyford I & IA production order	Handley Page Heyford Mk. I/IA
P.27/32	OR.7	Light day bomber – Hart/Hind replacement – see P.23/35	Armstrong Whitworth A.W.29, Fairey Battle, Gloster P.27/32, Bristol Type 136
R.1/33		Patrol/reconnaissance flying boat	Westland-Hill Pterodactyl Mk.VII
R.2/33	OR.8	Long-range patrol/reconnaissance flying boat	Short Sunderland, Saro A.33
R.3/33		Long-range patrol/reconnaissance flying boat – trials order for Singapore III	Short Singapore III
F.5/33	OR.9	Twin-engine two-seat turret fighter – later cancelled	Armstrong Whitworth A.W.34, Boulton Paul P.76, Bristol Type 140, Gloster F.5/33, Parnall F.5/33, Westland-Hill Pterodactyl Mk.V
T.6/33		Tiger Moth floatplane two aircraft evaluation order	de Havilland Tiger Moth
13/33		4-engined mail seaplane and 4-engine flying boat carrier – Short-Mayo Composite	Short S.20 Mercury, Short S.21 Maia
14/33		Fairey Gordon II production order	Fairey Gordon II
S.15/33	OR.10	Naval carrier-borne torpedo bomber/spotter/reconnaissance (TSR) – Fairey 9/30 (q.v.) design modified and re-submitted as T.S.R.II – Spec. replaces S.9/30 & M.1/30 (q.v.)	Blackburn Shark, Fairey Swordfish, Gloster TSR.38
18/33		Radio-controlled Fleet gunnery target aircraft	de Havilland Queen Bee
21/33		Three-seat general purpose/Army co-operation aircraft – Fairey IIIF/Wapiti replacement – improved Vildebeest	Vickers Vildebeest
F.22/33	OR.11	Fighter	Bristol Type 141
G.23/33		General purpose aeroplane – Hart for Middle East	Hawker Hardy
24/33		Gloster Gauntlet production order	Gloster Gauntlet
25/33		Twin-engined troop and cargo transport – improved Victoria	Vickers Valentia
T.26/33		Tiger Moth II production order	de Havilland Tiger Moth II
B.29/33		Twin engine medium day bomber with power-operated nose turret	Boulton Paul Sidestrand V (Overstrand)
1/34		Two-seat Army Co-operation Fighter Bomber for the Royal Australian Air Force	Hawker Demon
2/34		High-altitude research aircraft capable of reaching 50,000 ft	Bristol Type 138A
B.3/34	OR.12	Heavy bomber landplane, twin-engine night bomber & bomber/transport – Virginia, Heyford & Hendon replacement – transport requirement later removed after protests from manufacturers	Armstrong Whitworth Whitley, Bristol Type 144
P.4/34	OR.13	Light day bomber for tactical support	Fairey P.4/34, Hawker Henley
F.5/34	OR.14	Single-seat fighter (although contracts were placed for prototypes with three companies none were ordered into production)	Bristol Type 146, Martin-Baker M.B.2, Vickers Type 279 Venom, Gloster F.5/34
6/34		Single-engine biplane amphibian for Australia.	Supermarine Seagull V
G.7/34		Two-seat general purpose light bomber, Interim Hart day bomber replacement	Hawker Hind
8/34		Two-seat interceptor fighter (production of Demon I for the RAF)	Hawker Demon
9/34		Two-seat day bomber and army co-operation aircraft (production of Hawker Audax)	Hawker Audax
10/34		Hawker Hart communications aircraft (two aircraft delivered to No. 24 Squadron RAF)	Hawker Hart
11/34		Torpedo spotter reconnaissance aircraft development (One Fairey Seal fitted with an Armstrong Siddeley Panther VI engine)	Fairey Seal
12/34		Torpedo spotter reconnaissance aircraft development (production of 16 Sharks for use by No. 820 Squadron RAF)	Blackburn Shark
13/34		Bulldog trainer production (production of Bulldog TM Type 124)	Bristol Bulldog
R.14/34		Singapore III production order	Short Singapore III
15/34		Three-seat torpedo bomber (production of Mk III)	Vickers Vildebeest
16/34		Three-seat general purpose aircraft – Vincent I production order including conversion of outstanding Vildebeests to Vincents	Vickers Vincent I
17/34		Torpedo bomber (additional Baffin T.8A aircraft for conversion training, three built)	Blackburn Baffin
18/34		Single-engine day bomber (Hawker Hart IB production)	Hawker Hart
19/34		Two-seat Army co-operation aircraft (production of Audax Is for use in India, 50 aircraft built	Hawker Audax
B.20/34		Twin-engine night bomber – Hendon production order to this spec – see also B.19/27	Fairey Hendon
21/34		Two-seat fleet spotter reconnaissance aircraft (Osprey III production)	Hawker Osprey
22/34		Close-support aircraft – Audax for SAAF	Hawker Hartebeest
B.23/34		Twin engine medium day bomber – Overstrand production order	Boulton Paul Overstrand
24/34		Basic trainer – production order for second batch of definitive Tutor design – see 3/30, 18/31 & 25/32	Avro Tutor I
25/34		Amphibian trainer (production of three Clouds)	Saro Cloud
26/34		Float seaplane trainer (production of 16 Tutors for the Seaplane Training School)	Avro Type 646 Sea Tutor
O.27/34	OR.15	Naval dive bomber	Blackburn Skua
B.28/34		Twin-engine medium bomber – written for Heyford II production order	Handley Page Heyford Mk. II
29/34		Hawker Fury for the South African Air Force	Hawker Fury
30/34		Twin-engined troop and cargo transport – Valentia I production order	Vickers Valentia I
31/34		Armoured day bomber (development of armoured crew protection for the Hart)	Hawker Hart
32/34		Navigation trainer – Prefect production order	Avro 626/Prefect
F.36/34	OR.16	High Speed Monoplane Single Seater Fighter (based on the Hawker submission to F.5/34)	Hawker Hurricane
F.37/34	OR.17	High Speed Monoplane Single Seater Fighter (based on the private venture Supermarine Type 300 submission)	Supermarine Spitfire
S.38/34		Written for Swordfish production order	Fairey Swordfish I
A.39/34	OR.18	Two-seat Army co-operation aeroplane	Bristol Type 148, Westland Lysander
B.1/35	OR.19	Twin-engine heavy bomber	Airspeed A.S.29, Boulton Paul P.79, Armstrong Whitworth A.W.39, Handley Page H.P.55, Vickers Warwick
2/35		Naval catapult-launched observation/spotting flying boat for carriage on cruisers	Supermarine Walrus
4/35		Two-seat Army Co-operation Aeroplane – Hawker Audax replacement	Hawker Hector
F.9/35	OR.20	Two-seat four-gun turret fighter – Demon replacement	Hawker Hotspur, Boulton Paul Defiant, Bristol Type 147
F.10/35		Drawn up for the Spitfire prototype	Supermarine Spitfire
13/35		Naval torpedo-spotter-reconnaissance aircraft – written for Shark production order	Blackburn Shark
F.14/35		Written for Gladiator I initial production order	Gloster Gladiator I
M.15/35		Land-based general reconnaissance/torpedo-bomber	Blackburn Botha, Bristol Beaufort
16/35		Autogyro – written for Cierva C.30/Avro 671 Rota evaluation order	Avro Rota
18/35		Twin-engined coastal reconnaissance landplane – written for Anson	Avro Anson
20/35		Radio-controlled Fleet gunnery target aircraft – Queen Bee production order	de Havilland Queen Bee
B.21/35		Twin-engine medium bomber – written for Whitley II production order	Armstrong Whitworth Whitley II
G.22/35		General-purpose day and night bomber and coastal-defence torpedo-carrier – Wellesley production order – see also G.4/31	Vickers Wellesley
P.23/35		Written for Battle I production order	Fairey Battle I
G.24/35		General Reconnaissance – Anson replacement	Bristol Type 149, Bristol Beaufort
26/35		Naval fighter/reconnaissance – Osprey IV production order	Hawker Osprey IV
B.27/35		Twin-engine medium bomber – written for Heyford III production order	Handley Page Heyford Mk. III
B.28/35		Drawn up for Bristol 142M	Bristol Blenheim
B.29/35		Written for Harrow initial production order	Handley Page Harrow
O.30/35		Naval turret-fighter – fighter development of Skua accepted	Blackburn Roc, Boulton Paul P.85
Q.32/35		Radio-controlled Fleet Gunnery target aircraft – Queen Bee replacement	Airspeed Queen Wasp
F.34/35		Twin-engined turret-armed fighter	Gloster F.34/35
F.35/35		Very high speed fighter	Airspeed A.S.31, General Aircraft GAL.28, Bristol Type 151, Hawker Hurricane variant (none built)
36/35		Trans-Atlantic mail plane	de Havilland Albatross
F.37/35	OR.31	Fighter with cannon	Westland Whirlwind, Hawker Hurricane with Oerlikon cannon, Supermarine Type 313, Bristol Type 153
39/35		Twin-engine communications aircraft – Envoy with dorsal turret order for SAAF	Airspeed Envoy
R.1/36	OR.32	Small reconnaissance flying boat	Saro Lerwick, Blackburn B-20
2/36		Development of the Cierva C.30 (cancelled)	
3/36		Development of the Avro 652A (cancelled)	
4/36		Catapult bomber (cancelled)	Short S.27
5/36	OR.33	Improved Walrus for the Fleet Air Arm	Supermarine Walrus
T.6/36	OR.34	Advanced monoplane trainer mounting manually operated dorsal turret – Don accepted but proved unsuitable	de Havilland Don, Miles Kestrel
M.7/36		Torpedo Spotter Reconnaissance aircraft (cancelled)	Fairey Albacore
O.8/36	OR.36	Reconnaissance dive bomber for the Fleet Air Arm (cancelled)	
	S.9/36	Three-seat spotter fighter for the Fleet Air Arm (cancelled)	Fairey S.9/36
10/36	OR.38	Written for Beaufort production order	Bristol Beaufort I
11/36	OR.39	Interim General Reconnaissance – aircraft later renamed 'Blenheim IV' and 'Bolingbroke' name transferred to Canadian-built Blenheim	Bristol Bolingbroke I
B.12/36	OR.40	Four-engine heavy bomber 250 mph cruise, 1500 mile range, 4000 lb bomb load	Armstrong Whitworth B.12/36, Short Stirling, Supermarine B.12/36
P.13/36	OR.41	Twin-engined medium bomber for "world-wide use" (Note: The specification included torpedo carrying and catapult-assisted launching.) introduction delayed due to production difficulties necessitating further order of Whitleys & Wellingtons (Note: The requirement is often incorrectly stated to have required the use of Rolls-Royce Vulture engines. For example, by Thetford, Aircraft of the Royal Air Force since 1918, ("Avro Manchester") and Mason, The British Bomber ("Avro Manchester"). Buttler 2004, pp. 100–2 notes some of the submissions included other engines, and Sinnott, Aircraft Design, pp. 165–71.)	Avro Manchester (2 prototypes ordered), Handley Page H.P.56 (two prototype ordered), Hawker P.13/36 (project only), Vickers Warwick with Rolls-Royce Vulture engines.
14/36		Production specification for the Fairey Battle I	Fairey Battle (500 ordered later reduced to 311)
F.15/36		Written for Hurricane redesigned for Merlin II	Hawker Hurricane I
17/36		Written for Hotspur initial production order – later cancelled	Hawker Hotspur; cancelled
19/36		Naval torpedo-spotter-reconnaissance aircraft – written for Shark additional production order	Blackburn Shark
B.20/36		Twin-engine medium bomber – written for Whitley III production order	Armstrong Whitworth Whitley III
T.23/36		Multi-role crew trainer	Airspeed Oxford
25/36		Written for Skua initial production order	Blackburn Skua
26/36		Written for Roc initial production order	Blackburn Roc
29/36		Written for Wellington (revised Crecy from B.9/32) initial production order	Vickers Wellington I
B.30/36		Written for Hampden initial production order	Handley Page Hampden I
33/36		Written for Blenheim I production order (Rootes)	Bristol Blenheim I
36/36		Written for Lysander initial production order	Westland Lysander I
37/36		Written for Walrus additional production order	Supermarine Walrus I
39/36		Written for Botha additional production order (Boulton Paul) – cancelled	Blackburn Botha
T.40/36	OR.44	Development and production of a trainer version of the Miles Hawk	Miles Magister
S.41/36		Three-seat torpedo/spotter-reconnaissance aircraft – Swordfish replacement	Fairey Albacore
42/36		Target tug – order for Henley target tug conversions by Gloster's	Hawker Henley III
43/36		Autogyro	Cierva C.40 Rota II
B.44/36		Written for Dagger-Hampden (Hereford) production order	Handley Page Hereford I
45/36		Written for Botha additional production order (Blackburn) – cancelled	Blackburn Botha
47/36		Written for Bombay II production order	Bristol Bombay II
T.1/37		Basic trainer	Heston T.1/37 Trainer, Miles M.15, Parnall Heck III, Airspeed A.S.36 (not built)
2/37		Written for Blenheim I production order (Avro)	Bristol Blenheim I
6/37		Twin-engine VIP transport aircraft – order for The King's Flight	Airspeed Envoy
Q.8/37		Radio-controlled Fleet Gunnery target aircraft – Queen Bee replacement – role subsequently carried-on by Queen Wasp – see Q.32/35	Airspeed A.S.37 (not built)
F.9/37	OR.49	Twin-engine day/night fighter	Gloster G.39
F.11/37		Twin-engine two-seat day & night fighter/ground support	Boulton Paul P.92
F.18/37		Heavily armed interceptor armed with 12 x 0.303 mgs and capable of at least 400 mph	Bristol F.18/37, Gloster F.18/37, Hawker Tornado, Hawker Typhoon, Supermarine Type 324, Supermarine Type 325
19/37		Written for Manchester I production order	Avro Manchester I
20/37		Written for Roc floatplane production order	Blackburn Roc
S.23/37	OR.52	Four-engine carrier-based Fleet shadower/follower – low-speed, high-endurance, ship-tracking aircraft – requirement later rendered obsolete due to introduction of radar	Airspeed AS.39, General Aircraft GAL.38
S.24/37	OR.53	Naval torpedo/dive-bomber, reconnaissance – Supermarine entry featured variable-incidence wing	Supermarine S.24/37, Fairey Barracuda
32/37		Written for Halifax initial production order	Handley Page Halifax I Srs 1 – I Srs 3
B.32/37	OR.44	Production contract for a four-engine version of the P.13/36 H.P.56 design	Handley Page H.P.57 Halifax
F.36/37		Gladiator II production order	Gloster Gladiator II
37/37		Magister I production order	Miles Magister I
38/37		Three-seat communications aircraft & instrument/wireless trainer	Miles Mentor
T.39/37		Three-seat communications aircraft & instrument/wireless trainer	Airspeed AS.42 Oxford for the Royal New Zealand Air Force
42/37		Specification for wooden mockup of Miles X2 large transport aeroplane – not built – lead to Miles M.30X Minor scale testbed	Miles M.30X Minor
43/37		Engine testbed	Folland Fo.108; designs also tendered by General Aircraft & Percival
S.7/38		Naval catapult-launched observation/spotting flying boat – Walrus replacement	Supermarine Sea Otter
O.8/38		Naval carrier-borne fighter/observation – winner developed from Fairey's earlier P.4/34 entry	Fairey Fulmar
B.9/38		Twin-engine medium bomber of simple construction using materials other than light alloy wherever possible	see B.17/38 and B.18/38
14/38		Long-range pressurised high-altitude monoplane transport/airliner (Shorts) – 3 prototypes ordered, construction started – cancelled	Short S.32
15/38		Short/Medium-range monoplane transport/airliner (Fairey) – Fairey FC.1, 14-aircraft production order – cancelled	Fairey FC1, General Aircraft GAL.40
16/38		Trainer – Master I production order	Miles Master T.Mk.I
B.17/38		Twin-engine medium bomber of mixed wood/metal construction	Bristol Type 155 (cancelled by Bristol)
B.18/38		Twin-engine medium bomber of mixed wood/metal construction	Armstrong Whitworth Albemarle
B.19/38		Bomber with 8,000 lb load and eight 20mm cannon in two turrets – revised to become B.1/39	Bristol Type 157
20/38		Communications aircraft	Percival Proctor I
21/38		Communications aircraft – Dominie production order	de Havilland Dominie
S.22/38		Naval helicopter	Cierva C.41 Gyrodyne
24/38		Twin-engine communications aircraft – Envoy production order	Airspeed Envoy
25/38		Twin-engine communications aircraft	Percival Petrel
26/38	OR.65	Three-seat wireless or navigation training aircraft with dual controls – Vega Gull adapted for communications training	Percival Proctor II & III
28/38	OR.66	Two-seat helicopter – written for Weir W.6	Weir W.6
T.29/38		Twin-engine R/T (Radio Telephony) training aircraft – Dominie three aircraft order	de Havilland Dominie
B.1/39		"Ideal Bomber" four-engined heavy bomber with 9,000 lb bomb load and 20mm cannon defence (revised B.19/38) – work suspended June 1940	Handley Page H.P.60, Bristol Type 159, a Gloster submission, Armstrong Whitworth AW.68
T.4/39	OR.68	Single-engined trainer	Airspeed Cambridge – (two prototypes ordered, no production contract)
R.5/39		Long-range patrol flying boat – Sunderland replacement – superseded by R.14/40 (q.v.)	Saunders-Roe S.38 – later cancelled
N.8/39		Naval two-seat carrier-borne fighter – Roc replacement – replaced by N.5/40	see N.5/40
N.9/39		Naval two-seat carrier-borne fighter – Fulmar replacement – replaced by N.5/40	see N.5/40
F.17/39		Long-range fighter development of Bristol Beaufort – written for Beaufighter	Bristol Beaufighter
F.18/39		Fighter – Hurricane/Spitfire replacement	Martin-Baker M.B.3, Martin-Baker M.B.5
19/39		Twin-engine transport aircraft – order for Hertfordshire later cancelled	de Havilland Hertfordshire
20/39		Twin-engine communications aircraft – order for No. XXIV Squadron RAF	de Havilland Flamingo
21/39		Twin-engine VIP transport aircraft – order for The King's Flight	de Havilland Flamingo
F.22/39	OR.76	Fighter fitted with heavy-calibre nose-mounted gun	Vickers 414 Vickers Type 432 – also tests with Vickers Type 439 testbed – specification later cancelled
B.23/39		Very high altitude version of Wellington capable of operating at 40,000 ft	Vickers Wellington V
E.28/39		Experimental aircraft using Whittle jet-propulsion with provision for 4 × 0.303 machine guns	Gloster E.28/39

=== 1940–1949 ===
Spec	OR	Type	Designs
B.1/40	OR.78	Twin-engine fast bomber carrying no defensive armament	de Havilland Mosquito
F.1/40		Air observation post (AOP)	Fane F.1/40, General Aircraft GAL.47
2/40	OR.79	Twin-engined trainer aircraft	Caproni Ca 311, Caproni Ca 313
F.2/40		Fighter using Whittle jet-propulsion (Metrovick) – written for Meteor – see also F.9/40	Gloster Meteor II
B.3/40	OR.80	High speed bomber (was B.27/39)	Blackburn B.28
F.4/40	OR.81	High-altitude fighter – superseded by F.7/41 (q.v.)	Westland Welkin
N.5/40	OR.82	Naval 2-seat Fleet reconnaissance/fighter	Fairey Firefly
B.6/40	OR.83	Twin-engine day/close support bomber – later renamed Blenheim V	Bristol Bisley
B.7/40	OR.84	Medium Bomber replacement for Blenheim bomber development of Beaufighter	A design by Armstrong Whitworth not taken further Bristol Beaumont accepted but not built, led to Buckingham (q.v.)
8/40	OR.85	Ambulance Aircraft	Airspeed Oxford
F.9/40	OR.86	Fighter using Whittle jet-propulsion (Rover/Rolls-Royce) – written for Meteor – see also F.2/40	Gloster Meteor I
X.10/40	OR.87	Troop-carrying glider capable of carrying 7 troops	General Aircraft Hotspur I; cancelled after eighteen built – redesigned Hotspur II relegated to training – see X.22/40 & X.23/40
N.11/40	OR.88	Naval single-seat Fleet fighter powered by Napier Sabre – see also S.8/43	Blackburn Firebrand F.I, Hawker P.1009 "Fleet Fighter"
S.12/40	OR.89	Naval catapult-launched observation/spotting flying boat – Walrus & Sea Otter replacement – originally S.14/39 (Amphibian Reconnaissance Aircraft), superseded by S.14/44 (q.v.)	Supermarine Type 381
R.13/40	OR.90	General-purpose flying boat	Blackburn B-40
R.14/40	OR.91	Very long range reconnaissance flying boat – Centaurus-engined Sunderland replacement	Saunders-Roe S.41, Short Shetland
15/40	OR.92	Conversion of Supermarine Spitfire for Photographic Development Unit	Supermarine Spitfire
F.16/40		High-altitude fighter	Vickers Type 432
17/40	OR.94	Very high altitude bomber – Wellington V production order	Vickers Wellington V
F.18/40	OR.95	Night fighter with turret	Gloster F.18/40, fulfilled by de Havilland Mosquito NF.II
F.19/40		Low-cost emergency production fighter	Miles M.20/2
B.20/40		"Close Army Support Bomber" with Merlin engine able to dive bomb and photoreconnaissance	De-navalised version of Fairey Barracuda offered but specification not proceeded with.
F.21/40	OR.96	Fighter version of Mosquito	de Havilland Mosquito F.II
X.22/40		Troop-carrying training glider – Hotspur II production order	General Aircraft Hotspur II
X.23/40		Troop-carrying training glider – Hotspur II further production order	General Aircraft Hotspur II
T.24/40		Training aircraft	Airspeed A.S.50 (not built)
X.25/40	OR.98	Troop-carrying glider capable of carrying 14 troops	Slingsby Hengist
X.26/40	OR.99	Troop-carrying glider of wooden construction capable of carrying between 24 and 36 fully armed troops	Airspeed Horsa
X.27/40	OR.100	Tank-carrying heavy glider capable of carrying 7-ton load	General Aircraft Hamilcar
E.28/40	OR.101	Experimental research aircraft for deck landings – cancelled 1943	Folland Fo.115, Folland Fo.116 (ordered but not completed)
F.29/40		Twin-engined night fighter	to cover the Gloster "Reaper" development of F.9/37 (cancelled May 1941)
N.1/41	OR.102	Naval fighter	Miles M.20/4
B.2/41		Twin-engine bomber – Blenheim replacement – written for redesigned Bristol Type 162 Beaumont. Changes in requirements and availability of superior aircraft led to type no longer being needed	Bristol Buckingham (adapted for courier duties as C.1)
X.3/41	OR.104	Emergency Tallboy-carrying conversion of Horsa for attack on Tirpitz – later cancelled when Lancaster was modified to carry Tallboy	Airspeed A.S.52 Horsa
F.4/41		Spitfire with Griffon engine – written for Spitfire IV but amended to include Mk. XXI redesign. Preceded in introduction by Mk.s XII & XIV – some overlap with F.1/43 (q.v.)	Supermarine Spitfire XXI
B.5/41	OR.106	Pressurised high-altitude bomber – evolved into B.3/42 (q.v.)	Pressurised version of the Vickers Warwick III
E.6/41	OR.107	Experimental jet fighter – DH Spider Crab	de Havilland Vampire
F.7/41	OR.108	High-altitude fighter – revised from F.4/40 (q.v.)	Vickers Type 432, Westland Welkin
B.8/41		Four-engined heavy bomber – see also B.3/42	Short S.36, Vickers Windsor
T.9/41		Four-seat radio trainer.	Percival Proctor IV
F.10/41	OR.109	Written for Hawker Tempest a.k.a. "Thin-Wing Typhoon"	Hawker Tempest
B.11/41	OR.110	High-speed high-altitude unarmed bomber	de Havilland DH.99, Hawker P.1005, Miles M.39
12/41		Target tug	Miles Martinet
C.1/42	OR.113	Interim transport aircraft – cargo version of Lancaster – York I production order	Avro York I
N.2/42	OR.114	Single-seat boat fighter	Blackburn B-44
B.3/42	OR.115	High-performance long-range bomber	Vickers Windsor
B.4/42		High performance bomber (Mosquito replacement) – Cancelled	
5/42		Glider for RAAF	De Havilland Australia DHA-G2
E.5/42		Experimental single-engined jet fighter – later cancelled – see E.1/44	Gloster GA.1
E.6/42		Experimental lightweight Tempest – written for Tempest Light Fighter – refined & re-issued as F.2/43 (q.v.)	Hawker Fury – see F.2/43
F.6/42		Single-seat fighter	Boulton Paul P.99, Boulton Paul P.100, Hawker Type P.1018, Hawker Type P.1019, Hawker Type P.1020, Folland Fo.117a, Miles M.42, Miles M.43, Miles M.44
H.7/42	OR.117	Torpedo bomber – Beaufighter replacement	Bristol Brigand
R.8/42	OR.118	Long-range patrol/reconnaissance flying boat – Sunderland with Hercules engines	Short Sunderland IV/Seaford
Q.9/42	OR.119	Twin engine target tug – planned production of Monitor later cancelled – see also Q.1/46	'Miles Monitor TT Mk.1
10/42		"Special Rotating Wing Glider"	used to identify the Hafner Rotabuggy
11/42		"Special Rotating Wing Glider"	used to identify the Hafner Rotachute
F.1/43	OR.120	Development of Spitfire with Griffon & laminar flow wing.	Supermarine Spiteful
F.2/43	OR.121	Written for Tempest Light Fighter	Hawker Fury; cancelled at conclusion of hostilities.
TX.3/43	OR.122	Two-seat side-by-side seating training glider	General Aircraft G.A.L.55
N.4/43	OR.113	Carrier-based fighter – Seafire with Griffon engine	Supermarine Seafire XV
O.5/43	OR.144	Torpedo bomber – Barracuda replacement	Fairey Spearfish
S.6/43		Torpedo Bomber Reconnaissance Aircraft (Cancelled)	Armstrong Whitworth A.W.53
N.7/43		Carrier-based fighter – revised as N.22/43 (q.v.)	Hawker Sea Fury
S.8/43	OR.124	Naval single-seat Fleet fighter capable of carrying rockets, torpedo or bombs – Firebrand powered by Centaurus – see also N.11/40	Blackburn Firebrand TF.III
F.9/43	OR.125	Two-seat high-altitude night fighter	Westland Welkin NF.II
Q.10/43		Radio-controlled Fleet Gunnery target aircraft – Queen Wasp replacement	Miles Queen Martinet
S.11/43	OR.146	Naval carrier-borne attack/strike aircraft – later cancelled – Sturgeon also submitted to Q.1/46 & M.6/49 (q.v.)	Armstrong Whitworth A.W.54, Short Sturgeon
F.12/43	OR.126	Long-range fighter for Far East – written for Hornet	de Havilland Hornet
T.13/43	OR.148	Advanced trainer	Bristol Buckmaster
B.14/43		Heavy bomber for Far East	Avro Lincoln, Handley Page H.P.65
15/43	OR.151	Medium Range Civil Transport Aircraft	Handley Page Hermes
E.16/43		Experimental helicopter with powered tilting hub controlled rotor with automatic collective pitch control, and torque reaction control using jet efflux.	Cierva W.9
A.17/43	OR.145	Army liaison and VIP transport aircraft – Messenger I production order	Miles Messenger I
C.18/43		Stop-gap airliner version of Stirling	Short S.37 Stirling
F.19/43	OR.127		Folland design to be built by English Electric
20/43	OR.142	Two-seat training glider suitable for ATC cadets	Slingsby Kirby Cadet TX Mk.1
T.21/43	OR.153	Trainer version of Fairey Spearfish	Fairey Spearfish T. Mk 1
N.22/43	OR.155	Revision of N.7/43; carrier-based fighter	Hawker Sea Fury
T.23/43	OR.131	Trainer – all-weather fully aerobatic three-seater	Percival Prentice
E.24/43		Experimental jet research aircraft capable of 1,000 mph and able to reach 36,000 ft in 1 and 1/2 minutes	Miles M.52; cancelled 1946
25/43		Brabazon IIA – Civil Transport for European service	Airspeed Ambassador
C.26/43 (26/43)		Brabazon VB – Light Civil Air Transport	De Havilland Dove
B.27/43	OR.149	Heavy bomber – developed Halifax	Handley Page HP.66 and HP.69 – cancelled with end of war. (Note: HP.66 would have had Hercules 100 engines, HP.69 turbo-supercharged Hercules.)
S.28/43	OR.150	Firebrand replacement	Blackburn B-48 YA.1/Firecrest
29/43		Airliner version of Lancaster IV – see also B.14/43	Avro Tudor
E.1/44	OR.157	Experimental Nene-powered jet fighter	Gloster GA.2
2/44	Brabazon Committee Type I	Long range transatlantic airliner	Bristol Brabazon I, Miles X-11 (not built)
C.3/44		Long-range general-purpose transport – York replacement	Handley Page Hastings
X.4/44	OR.160	Tank-carrying heavy glider capable of carrying 7-ton load and returning under its own power	General Aircraft Hamilcar X
N.5/44	OR.162	Naval carrier-version of Hornet	de Havilland Sea Hornet
E.6/44	OR.170	Written for Saro SR.44 flying-boat jet fighter	Saro SR.A/1
N.7/44	OR.167	Carrier-based fighter – navalised version of Spitfire F Mk.21	Supermarine Seafire F Mk.45
PR.8/44		Photoreconnaissance version of the Bristol Buckingham	Specification cancelled
E.9/44		Flying wing jet bomber/airliner	Armstrong Whitworth A.W.52
E.10/44	OR.182	RAF (land) variant of Nene-powered jet fighter prototype	Supermarine Attacker
N.11/44	OR.174	Naval long-range carrier-based fighter with Eagle 22 piston engine capable of accepting a turboprop at a later date – RN version of F.13/44 (q.v.) – see also N.12/45	Westland Wyvern
12/44		Medium range civil transport aircraft	Handley Page Hermes II
F.13/44	OR.194	Long-range fighter with Eagle 22 piston engine capable of accepting a turboprop at a later date – RAF version of N.11/44 (q.v.) – see also N.12/45	Westland Wyvern, Hawker P.1027/P.1030
S.14/44	OR.89	Naval land-based ASR	Supermarine Seagull ASR-1
N.15/44	OR.189	Naval carrier-version of Mosquito	de Havilland Sea Mosquito TR.33
16/44		Stop-gap airliner version of Lancaster	Avro Lancastrian C.Mk 1
17/44		Medium-short haul passenger aircraft – stop-gap airliner version of Wellington	Vickers Wellington Transport Aircraft
18/44	Brabazon Committee Type Va	Civil feederliner	Miles Marathon
19/44		Civil transport version of the Avro York C1	Avro York
20/44		Jet civil transport (de Havilland DH.106)	Not issued
O.21/44		Twin-Merlin engined Fairey Spearfish	Specification cancelled
22/44		Transport aircraft – mixed passenger, freight/passenger or all-freight high-payload/short-distance – see also C.9/45	Bristol Wayfarer/Freighter
E.1/45	OR.195	Naval variant of Nene-powered jet fighter prototype	Supermarine Attacker (Royal Navy)
A.2/45	OR.176	Army air observation post (AOP) – replacement for Taylorcraft Auster AOPs	Auster A.2/45, Heston A.2/45
B.3/45	OR.199	Two-seat twin-engine high-altitude fast jet bomber carrying no defensive armament – Mosquito replacement – revised from E.3/45 (q.v.)	English Electric Canberra B.1 – see also B.5/47
B.3/45		Experimental two-seat twin-engine high-altitude fast jet bomber carrying no defensive armament – Mosquito replacement – reissued as B.3/45 (q.v.)	English Electric Canberra
A.4/45	OR.164	Army three-seat light communications aircraft – Leonides-powered Pioneer II later accepted 1950	Scottish Aviation Pioneer I
N.5/45		Naval carrier-borne variant of Supermarine Spiteful	Supermarine Seafang
T.7/45	OR.159	Three-seat advanced trainer using turboprop engine – Harvard replacement – replaced by T.14/47 (q.v.)	Avro Athena T.1, Boulton Paul Balliol T.1
TX.8/45	OR.180	Tandem-seat training glider for Air Training Corps	Slingsby T.24 Falcon 4
C.9/45	OR.192	Military transport aircraft capable of carrying a 3 ton load into jungle areas – see also 22/44	Bristol Wayfarer/Freighter
F.11/45		Naval jet fighter – DH Vampire for sea trials – cancelled	de Havilland Vampire Mk X
N.12/45	OR.213	Long-range carrier-based fighter – Wyvern with Python turboprop engine – see also F.13/44 & N.11/44	Westland Wyvern S.4
C.13/45		High speed military transport aircraft	Airspeed Ayrshire
GR.14/45		Maritime reconnaissance aircraft – Vickers project, cancelled.	
C.15/45		Long range transport aircraft	Handley Page H.P.72
N.16/45		Twin-engined strike aircraft – Three aircraft ordered from Fairey but not built.	Fairey N.16/45,
GR.17/45	OR.220	Carrier-borne ASW	Blackburn B-54/B-88, Fairey Gannet
E.18/45	OR.207	Experimental aircraft – Single-engine jet aircraft for use as an aerodynamic testbed for tail less design.	De Havilland DH.108
Q.19/45	OR.204	Mosquito target tug	de Havilland Mosquito TT.39
E.20/45	OR.221	Experimental helicopter – see also E.34/46	Bristol Type 171
N.21/45	OR.226	Naval carrier-borne two-seat night fighter	de Havilland Sea Hornet NF.21
Q.1/46	OR.225	Naval target tug	de Havilland Mosquito TT.39, Miles Monitor, Short Sturgeon TT.1,
2/46	Brabazon Committee Type I	Long range transatlantic airliner – Brabazon II (Coupled Proteus) order	Bristol Brabazon II
C.3/46		Medium-range tactical transport	General Aircraft Ltd. 65 Universal Freighter
N.3/46		Naval helicopter	Cierva Air Horse
E.4/46		Experimental gyrodyne	Fairey Gyrodyne
R.5/46	OR.200	Four engine long-range Maritime patrol bomber – Liberator GR replacement	Avro Shackleton
E.6/46	OR.216	Experimental long range aircraft – variant of the Avro Lincoln	Avro 689
N.7/46	OR.218	Naval carrier-borne interceptor/fighter bomber	Hawker Sea Hawk
C.9/46		All-round air transport – military version of Viking	Vickers Valetta C.Mk.1
N.11/46		Two-seat trainer version of Sea Fury	Hawker Sea Fury T.20
B.14/46	OR.239	Four engine jet medium bomber – later used as insurance against delay of aircraft submitted to B.35/46	Short Sperrin
C.16/46	Brabazon Committee Type IIB	Short-medium range turboprop airliner carrying 24–30 passengers	Armstrong Whitworth A.W.55 Apollo, Handley Page H.P.76, Handley Page H.P.77, Handley Page H.P.78, Vickers Viscount
E.19/46		Experimental helicopter for crop spraying	Cierva Air Horse
22/46	Brabazon Committee Type IV	Jet-propelled trans-atlantic mail plane/jet airliner – MoS order for two Comet prototype/production aircraft	de Havilland Comet
26/46	Brabazon Committee Type II	Short-range feederliner – Dragon Rapide replacement	de Havilland Dove
E.27/46	OR.241	Experimental aircraft for investigation into delta wing characteristics at transonic speeds	Boulton Paul P.111
X.30/46		Assault glider	Shorts S.48 / S.A.9
PR.31/46	OR.223	Photo Reconnaissance version of B.3/45	English Electric Canberra PR3
E.34/46	OR.242	Experimental helicopter – see also E.20/45	Bristol Sycamore
B.35/46	OR.229	Four engine swept-wing jet medium bomber with a cruising speed of 500 kt and a ceiling of at least 55,000 ft	Armstrong Whitworth A.W.56, Avro Vulcan, Bristol Type 172, de Havilland DH.111, Handley Page Victor, Short PD.1; Designs also submitted by Vickers & English Electric
E.38/46	OR.243	Experimental aircraft for investigation into the controllability and stability of swept wings at low speeds.	Hawker P.1052
N.40/46	OR.246	Naval carrier-borne jet fighter – see also F.4/48	de Havilland DH.110
E.41/46		Experimental swept-wing version of Attacker – evolved into Swift	Supermarine 510, Supermarine Swift
R.42/46		Marine Reconnaissance Landplane (Avro Shackleton MR.III replacement) – cancelled	Avro Shackleton MR.IV
F.43/46	OR.228	Interceptor with 4.5 inch recoilless gun using Rolls-Royce AJ.65 or Metrovick F.9 axial engines – superseded by F.3/48 (q.v.)	Gloster P.234, Gloster P.248, Gloster P.250, Hawker P.1054, Supermarine Type 508 variant
F.44/46	OR.227	Two-seat twin-engined night/all weather fighter	see F.24/48 & F.4/48
T.1/47	OR.238	Two-seat trainer version of Meteor – written around Gloster's civil Meteor demonstrator G-AKPK	Gloster Meteor T.7
C.2/47	Brabazon Committee Type III	Airliner – medium-range Empire transport	Bristol Britannia, Handley Page H.P.83, Handley Page H.P.84, Handley Page H.P.85, Handley Page H.P.86
F.3/47		Fighter – Vampire with wing strengthened for carriage of underwing stores	de Havilland Vampire F.Mk.3
B.5/47	OR.235	Three-seat twin-engine high-altitude fast jet bomber carrying no defensive armament – Mosquito replacement – revised from B.3/45 (q.v.) to include visual bombing requirement	English Electric Canberra B.2
A.6/47		Two-seat Army Helicopter	Bristol Type 171
E.8/47	OR.250	Experimental one-half scale research version of Bristol Type 172 four-jet long-range bomber design – later revised for reconfigured Type 176 – all subsequently cancelled	Bristol Type 174
N.9/47	OR.254	Naval carrier-borne jet fighter/research aircraft	Supermarine Type 508, Supermarine Type 529
E.10/47	OR.252	Experimental research jet	Fairey Delta 1
T.14/47	OR.159	Two-seat advanced trainer using Merlin 35 – replacement for T.7/45 (q.v.)	Avro Athena T.2, Boulton Paul Balliol T.2
E.1/48		Small Jet Propelled Helicopter (not-built)	Isacco Helicogyre No. 5
R.2/48	OR.231	Reconnaissance flying boat, updated and renumbered as R.112D in 1950s but cancelled. Expected order for PD.2 suspended	Blackburn B-78, (Note: According to Buttler no official sources acknowledge the B-78 as being tendered to the specification.) Saunders-Roe P.104/Saunders-Roe P.162, developed Short Shetland Short PD.2, Supermarine 524
F.3/48	OR.228	Written for P.1067, replaced F.43/46. 630 mph at 45,000 ft in 6 minutes. Single Avon or Sapphire engine, armed with two or four 30 mm Aden cannon.	Hawker P.1067 (Hawker Hunter), Bristol Type 177, Gloster P.275, Supermarine Type 526
F.4/48	OR.227	Two-seat twin-engined night/all weather fighter – replacement for Vampire NFs	de Havilland DH.110, Gloster Javelin
5/48		Long Range Empire Aircraft (cancelled)	Avro 709, Blackburn B-73, Fairey FC.4
E.6/48	no OR	Experimental research aircraft using one-third scale version of Handley Page B.35/46 wing design	Handley Page HP.88
E.7/48		Experimental unmanned target aircraft powered by turbojet engine – Queen Martinet replacement	Government Aircraft Factory Jindivik
T.8/48	OR.260	ab initio trainer – Tiger Moth replacement – written for Chipmunk T.10 production order	de Havilland Chipmunk T.10
B.9/48	OR.231	Four engine jet medium bomber – less advanced stop-gap for B.35/46 designs – written around Valiant	Vickers Valiant
10/48		Twin-engine crop sprayer (cancelled)	Cierva W.11T
11/48		Production of Avro Tudor IVB civil aircraft (cancelled)	
T.12/48		Trainer – two-seat Wyvern conversion trainer	Westland Wyvern T.3
T.13/48	OR.249	Trainer – multi-engine – replacement for Wellington T.Mk 10	Vickers Varsity T.Mk 1
S.14/48	NAR.21, OR.264	Naval version of the Sikorsky S-51	Westland Dragonfly
E.15/48	no OR	Experimental one-third scale low-speed research version of Avro's B.35/46 design	Avro 707
T.16/48	OR.257	Trainer – Prentice replacement	Avro 714, Handley Page H.P.R.2, Percival Provost, Boulton Paul P.115, Boulton Paul P.116
T.17/48	OR.260	Primary Elementary Trainer	Fairey Primer
B.22/48	OR.302	Pathfinder version of Canberra	English Electric Canberra B.5
F.24/48	OR.265	Two-seat twin-engined night/all weather fighter – interim stop-gap for F.4/48 – Meteor NF development originally to F.44/46 (q.v.)	Armstrong Whitworth Meteor NF.11
T.1/49	OR.269	Navigation / AI trainer	Vickers Type 743 Valetta T.3
T.2/49	OR.244	Dual-control training version of Canberra	English Electric Canberra T.4
T.3/49		Flying classroom	Avro Anson – cancelled
E.4/49		Experimental aircraft for B.9/48	Vickers Type 663 Tay Viscount
F.5/49		Long range fighter for RAF	
M.6/49	OR.275 / NRA/9	Light carrier-borne ASW – written around Short Sturgeon variant – spec derived from GR.17/45	Short S.B.3
7/49		not issued	
N.8/49	NRA/18	Naval strike aircraft	de Havilland DH.109 cancelled
A.9/49	OR.274	Army / RAF evacuation helicopter	Bristol Sycamore HC.10 & Bristol Sycamore HC.11 prototypes
E.10/49		Experimental – additional order for Avro 707s including side-by-side seating conversion-trainers – these later cancelled – see also E.15/48	Avro 707
E.11/49		Experimental – flying shell of B.35/46	cancelled
12/49P		Proposed production of B.5/47 by English Electric	cancelled
A.13/49	OR.281	Army helicopter	Saunders-Roe Skeeter
N.14/49	NA/A.14	Naval carrier-borne all-weather strike fighter – see also N.40/46 & F.4/48	de Havilland Sea Vixen
F.15/49	OR.277	Jet fighter – interim Vampire replacement	de Havilland Venom
E.16/49	OR.282	Swept-wing Mach 2 research aircraft	Armstrong-Whitworth AW.58
T.17/49	NR/A20 & OR.283	Crew trainer for Royal Navy / FAA	Percival Sea Prince T.1
C.18/49	NR/A15 & OR.283	Communication aircraft	Percival Sea Prince C.1
19/49P		Transport – Hastings C.2 order	Handley Page Hastings C.2
A.20/49	OR.270	Air observation post aircraft	Auster AOP.9, Percival O.68 and Percival P.69 tendered
A.20/49 Issue 2		Production Auster AOP.9	Auster AOP.9
21/49		Medium range passenger transport	Vickers VC.2 Type 630 Viscount
U.22/49		high speed pilotless target aircraft and launching ramp	GAF Jindivik II – cancelled
F.23/49	OR.268	Supersonic jet fighter/interceptor	English Electric P.1 & English Electric P.1A
F.23/49 Issue 2	OR.268 Issue 1	Three prototype supersonic jet fighter/interceptor aircraft	English Electric P.1B Lightning
F.23/49 Issue 3	OR.268 Issue 4	Three prototype supersonic jet fighter/interceptor aircraft	English Electric P.1B Lightning
F.23/49 Issue 4	OR.268 Issue 6	20 pre-production supersonic jet fighter/interceptor aircraft	English Electric P.1B Lightning
F.23/49 Issue 5		outline Specification for proposed German version	English Electric P.1B Lightning
23/49P	OR.268 Issue 6	Fifty production supersonic jet fighter/interceptor aircraft	English Electric Lightning F.1 & English Electric Lightning F.1A
23/49P.2	OR.268 Issue 6	Forty two production supersonic jet fighter/interceptor aircraft	English Electric Lightning F.2
23/49P.3		Forty seven production supersonic jet fighter/interceptor aircraft + 3 prototypes converted from a pre-prod a/c and two F.2s	English Electric Lightning F.3
H.24/49		Air ambulance helicopter (cancelled)	Fairey FB-1 Gyrodyne
U.25/49		Small low speed pilotless target aircraft and launching pad (cancelled replaced by U.120D)	
26/49		Replacement for the de Havilland Rapide (cancelled)	Blackburn B-84, Folland Fo 134
E.27/49		Configuration Research for F.23/49 (Cancelled and replaced with ER.100)	Short SB.5
F.28/49		Development of E.38/46 (P.1052) for Australian government.	Hawker P.1052

== Post 1949 specifications. Air Staff Operational Requirements/targets ==
Spec	OR	Year	Type	Related aircraft
ER.100		1950	Experimental low-speed research aircraft with highly-swept wings in support of F23/49 (i.e. English Electric P.1)	Short SB.5
M.101	NA.28	1950, 1952	Three-seat anti-submarine aircraft	Fairey Firefly AS.7
N102		1950	Two-seat trainer for Royal Navy	Boulton Paul Sea Balliol
ER.103		1950	Delta-wing research aircraft capable of Mach 1.5	Fairey Delta 2
B.104	OR.285	1950	Low-level, medium-range Pathfinder aircraft for Bomber Command	Vickers Valiant B.2
F.105D	OR.288/2	1951	Swept wing day-fighter development of E41/46 (qv.) for RAF	Supermarine Swift
F.105D2			High performance derivative of Supermarine Swift	Supermarine Type 545
F.105P2	OR.288/3	1951	Production of Supermarine Swift Marks 1–4	Supermarine Swift
N.105D&P	NA.34	1952	Navalised version of Supermarine Swift	Supermarine Type 548
FR.105D&P	OR.308	1952	Fighter-reconnaissance version of Supermarine Swift	Supermarine Swift FR.5
PR.105D&P	OR.310	1952	Medium/high-altitude reconnaissance version of Supermarine Swift	Supermarine Swift PR.6
F.105D&P3		1953	Supermarine Swift armed with Fairey Fireflash air-to-air missiles	Supermarine Swift F.7
H.106		1951	General purpose helicopter – update of E.34/46 (qv.)	Bristol Sycamore Mark 3
A.106P		1951	Production of Sycamore helicopter for Army	Bristol Sycamore HC.11
HR.106P – HR.106P5	OR.304	1952–53	Air-sea rescue helicopters for RAF and RAAF	Bristol Sycamore HR.12, HR.50, HR.13, HR.51, HR.14
N.107	NA.30	1951	Naval all-weather fighter	de Havilland Sea Venom
F.108	OR.265/2	1951	Night fighter for RAF	de Havilland Venom NF.2
UB.109	AST.1097	1951–1953	Expendable Bomber (i.e., guided missile)	Bristol Type 182, Vickers Type 655, Boulton Paul P123
ER.110T		1951	Variable sweepback research monoplane	Armstrong Whitworth AW.59, Blackburn B.90, Boulton Paul P.121, Bristol Type 183, Saro P.149
F.111P	OR.265	1951	Interim jet-powered night fighter for RAF	de Havilland Vampire NF.10
T.111P		1952	Two-seat trainer version of de Havilland Vampire	de Havilland Vampire T.11
T.111P2	NA.36	1952	Two seat Vampire Trainer for RN	de Havilland Sea Vampire T.22
R.112D	OR.231/3		Reconnaissance flying boat	Short PD.3
N.113D&P	NA.17	1951–1953	Supermarine N.9/47 Development and Production	Supermarine Type 544 Scimitar F.1
N.114T	NA.14	1951	All-weather Naval Fighter	Armstrong Whitworth AW.165, Blackburn B.89, Fairey N.114T, Saro P.148, Short PD.5, Westland N.114T
C.115P	OR.266/2	1951	VIP version of Handley Page Hastings	Handley Page Hastings C.4
T.116D	OR.278	1951	Trainer version of de Havilland DH.110 for RAF	
F118D, F118P		c. 1953	All-weather fighter	"Super Javelin" Gloster Javelin with new wing. Gloster GA.6/P.356
F.119D		1952	Hawker Hunter derivative with reheated Rolls-Royce Avon RA.14R and increased wingsweep	Hawker P.1083
U.120D		1951	Remotely piloted target aircraft	ML U.120
C.121P	OR.300	1952	Communication aircraft for RAF	Percival Pembroke C.1
ID.122D&P		1953	Intruder version of Canberra bomber	English Electric Canberra B(I)8
PR.122P		1954	High-altitude reconnaissance version of Canberra	English Electric Canberra PR.9
M.123	NA.32	1954	Light carrier-based anti submarine aircraft	Short Seamew
F.124T	OR.301	1952	Rocket fighter – superseded by F.137D and F.138D for Avro and Saro designs	Avro 720, Blackburn B.97, Boulton Paul P.122, Bristol Type 178, Fairey F.124T, Hawker P.1089, Saro P.154, Short PD.7, Westland F.124T
EH.125		1952	Experimental rotor-blade tip-jet powered helicopter	Percival P.74
B.126T	OR.314	1952	Low-level bomber – cancelled 1954	Avro 721, Bristol 186, Handley Page H.P.99, Short PD.9.
H.127	NA.37	1952		Westland-Sikorsky WS-55
HCC.127		1958	Whirlwind helicopter for Queens Flight	Westland Whirlwind HCC 8
B.128P	OR.229/3	1952	Production of Victor B.1 bomber	Handley Page Victor B.1
B.128P2		1958	Improved version of Victor bomber	Handley Page Victor B.2
B.129P		1952	Production of Vulcan B.1	Avro Vulcan B.1
B.129P2		1958	Improved version of Avro Vulcan	Avro Vulcan B.2
T.130D&P		1952	Conversion of unsold Handley Page Marathon airliners to navigation trainers for RAF	Handley Page Marathon T.11
N.131T		1952	All weather fighter for Royal Navy – no further action	de Havilland DH.116
C.132	OR.315	1952	Long-range jet transport	Vickers V.1000
ER.133			Rocket-powered research aircraft – not issued	Bristol Type 178
ER.134D		1954	High-speed research aircraft	Bristol Type 188
F.137D	OR.301/2	1953	Rocket powered interceptor – written around Avro 720	Avro 720
F.138D	OR.301/2	1953	Mixed rocket-jet interception fighter – written around SR.53	Saunders-Roe SR.53
F.139	NA.38/3	1954	Two-seat naval all-weather fighter	de Havilland Sea Vixen FAW.1
D.140P		1953	Pilotless target conversion of Fairey Firefly	Fairey Firefly U.8
	OR.323	1953	Transport aircraft – Hastings and Valetta replacement. Vickers 799 selected but requirement superseded by C.195/OR.344 (q.v.) written around Armstrong Whitworth AW.650 Argosy	Armstrong Whitworth AW.55 and AW.56, Aviation Trader ATL-95, Blackburn B-104, Bristol Type 179, Vickers Type 799
RH.142D	OR.334	1953	VTOL transport aircraft	Fairey Rotodyne; later cancelled
ER.143		1953	Experimental direct jet-lift VTOL research aircraft	Short SC.1
HR.144	OR.31934408	1953	Ultra Light Helicopter	Fairey ULH
HR.146D&P	NA.43	1953	Development of Bristol 173 for the Royal Navy. Cancelled in favour of Westland Wessex.	Bristol Type 191 for the Royal Navy
T147T	OR.318		Advanced jet trainer – not progressed	Avro Type 725
M.148	NA.39	1954	Low level naval strike aircraft	Blackburn Buccaneer S.1, Armstrong Whitworth AW.168, Fairey M.148T, Hawker P.1108, Short PD.13, Westland M.148T
HR.149D&P	ASR.326	1955	Anti-submarine development of the Bristol 173 for RAF (and later Royal Canadian Air Force).	Bristol Type 191
H.150D&P	OR.325	Twin-rotor transport helicopter for RAF	Development of the Bristol 191 for the Royal Air Force	Bristol Type 192 as the Westland Belvedere HC.1
C.151			Communications aircraft	de Havilland Heron C.2 and C.3
F.153D		1955	All weather fighter (Javelin development)	"Thin Wing Gloster All Weather Fighter". Updating of F.118. Gloster P.376
AEW.154	NA.64	1955	Carrier-based Airborne Early Warning aircraft	Fairey Gannet AEW.3
F.155T	OR.329	1955	High-altitude fighter – Fairey Delta III selected but project cancelled in 1957	Armstrong Whitworth AW.169, de Havilland DH.117, English Electric P.8, Fairey Delta III, Hawker P.1103, Saro P.187, Vickers Type 559
R.156T	OR.330	1954	High-altitude supersonic reconnaissance aircraft	Avro 730, English Electric P.10, Handley Page HP.100, Short PD.12, Vickers SP.4
RB.156T	OR.330/2	1956	Reconnaissance-bomber – development of R.156T – cancelled 1957	Avro 730
T.157D&P		1955	Two-seat trainer version of Hawker Hunter for RAF	Hawker Hunter T.7
N.157D&P		1957	Two-seat trainer version of Hawker Hunter for Royal Navy	Hawker Hunter T.8
C.159P		1955	Purchase of single example of Bristol Freighter for A&AEE	Bristol Freighter Mk. 31
ER.161		1955	Research aircraft for narrow delta wings	Armstrong Whitworth AW.171 (VTOL with lift jets), Armstrong Whitworth AW.172 (no lift jets, thin wings)
F.162D		1955	Light jet fighter for RAF – development of Folland Midge	Folland Gnat F.1
H.163		1955	Light helicopter for AOP duties for Army and training for RAF	Saunders-Roe Skeeter AOP.10, T.11, AOP.12, T.13
ER.163		195?	Experimental Fairey Delta 2 with de Havilland Gyron engine – later cancelled	Fairey Delta 2
FR.164D&P		1958	Fighter-reconnaissance version of Hawker Hunter	Hawker Hunter FR.10
R.165D			Specification for radios and radar for de Havilland Comet C.2. Not proceeded with.	Possibly related to de Havilland Comet 2R ELINT aircraft
ER.166D		1955	Jet-propelled lift-fan VTOL research aircraft – not proceeded with	Boulton Paul P.132
F.167D			Hawker Hunter with AI.20 radar and de Havilland Firestreak air-to-air missiles. One aircraft (Hawker P.1109B) built	Hawker Hunter
D.168D&P		1955	Conversion of Fairey Firefly AS.4 and AS.5 to pilotless target drone	Fairey Firefly U.9
D.169D&P		1955	Conversion of Canberra B2 to pilotless target drone	English Electric Canberra U.10, U.14
HAS.170D&P	NA.43	1956	Anti-submarine helicopter for Royal Navy	Westland Wessex HAS.1
D.171D&P		1955	Conversion of Avro Lincoln to pilotless target drone – Only two aircraft converted	Avro Lincoln U.5
F.172D			Lightweight supersonic fighter – variant of Folland Gnat with thin wing, afterburning engine and air-to-air missiles. Unbuilt	Folland Gnat F.2
D.173D&P			Conversion of Gloster Meteor F.4 to pilotless target drones by Flight Refuelling Ltd	Gloster Meteor U.15
D.174D&P		1956	Conversion of Gloster Meteor F.8 to pilotless target drones by Flight Refuelling Ltd	Gloster Meteor U.16
ER.175			Proposed conversion of de Havilland Canada DHC-3 Otter with jet flaps. Unbuilt	
C.176		1956	Long range transport aircraft for RAF – military version of Bristol Britannia airliner	Bristol Britannia C.1
F.177D	OR.337 / NA.47	1956	Mixed power (rocket and turbojet) interceptor for RAF and Royal Navy	Saunders-Roe SR.177
T.178D&P		1957	Dual control trainer version of English Electric Lightning	English Electric Lightning T.4
TT.179D			Target-tug conversion of Meteor night fighter for RAF. Not proceeded with, but similar conversions made for RN as TT.20	Gloster Meteor TT.20
ER.180D		1956	Sub-scale model of Avro 730 high-altitude reconnaissance-bomber to aid in development. Cancelled in 1957 with Avro 730	Avro 731
ER.181T			Proposed high-speed (Mach 4–5) research aircraft. Not proceeded with.	
T.182D			Proposed conversion of English Electric Canberra B.2 to radar trainer. Unbuilt.	
ER.183D			Proposed conversion by Handley Page of Jet Provost trainer for boundary layer control research. Unbuilt	Handley Page HP.103
ER.184D		1957	Conversion by Marshall's of Cambridge of Auster T.7 to boundary layer control research aircraft. One aircraft converted.	Marshalls MA.4
T.185D		1958	Two seat trainer version of Folland Gnat for RAF.	Folland Gnat T.1
C.186P		1957	Twin-engined STOL transport for RAF	Scottish Aviation Twin Pioneer
D.187D&P			Proposed conversion of Gloster Meteor NF.11 to pilotless target drone. Unbuilt.	
ER.189D		1959	Purpose-built research aircraft for blown flaps. One example built.	Hunting H.126
CC.190D			Evaluation of Edgar Percival EP.9 for Army Air Corps. Two tested, but no further purchases.	Edgar Percival EP.9
HAS.191D		1958	Fairey Ultra Light Weight helicopter (see HR.144D) for anti-submarine and communications use from small ships. Two evaluated. No production.	
RB.192D	GOR.339 / OR.343	1957 (Note: GOR.339. RB.192D was issued in 1960, after the TSR.2 had been selected.)	STOL Tactical-Strike/Reconnaissance aircraft capable of Mach 2 and suitable for operation from unpaved strips – Canberra replacement. TSR.2 selected.	Avro 738, Bristol Type 204, English Electric P.17A, Vickers Type 571, BAC TSR.2
ER.193D		1959	Conversion of Fairey Delta 2 with new Ogee delta wing. Specification developed into ER.221 (q.v.)	BAC.221
HAS.194D		1959	Small shipboard anti-submarine helicopter	Saunders-Roe P.531
C.195	OR.344	1959	Replacement for Hastings and Valetta. Requirement replaced OR.323 (q.v.) and written around military derivative of Armstrong Whitworth AW.650 Argosy.	Armstrong Whitworth AW.660 Argosy
X.197T		1959	Research glider with slender delta wing – abandoned in favour of powered ER.197D (q.v.).	Avro 759, Bristol Type 215, Fairey X.197, Handley Page HP.115, Slingsby Sailplanes T.48, Supermarine Type 573, Miles M.110
ER.197D		1959	Powered research aircraft for low speed handling of narrow delta wings.	Handley Page HP.115
UB.198		1959	Nuclear armed air-to surface missile for V-bombers	Avro Blue Steel
D.199D&P			Proposed conversion of English Electric Canberra B2 to U.14 pilotless drones. Unbuilt.	
UB.200D	OR.1159		Long range nuclear armed guided bomb. Ramjet powered derivative of Blue Steel missile. Cancelled December 1959.	Avro Blue Steel Phase 2
H.201		1960	Version of Saunders-Roe P.531 for Army Air Corps	Westland Scout AH.1
D.202D&P		1959	Pilotless target drone	GAF Jindivik
C.203	ASR.371	1959	Long-range strategic transport	Avro Type 756, Hawker P.1131, Handley Page HP.111, Short Belfast, Vickers VC10 Military Freighter
ER.204D		1960	Experimental VTOL aircraft using Bristol Pegasus	Hawker P.1127
T.205D&P		1960	Two seat trainer version of English Electric Lightning	English Electric Lightning T.5
ER.206	OR.346	1959	Variable-sweep wing research aircraft, closely aligned with OR.346 for a strike aircraft for RAF and RN. Not developed.	BAC/Type 588, Vickers ER.206, Vickers Type 583
CC.207D&6	OR.342	1960	Purchase of de Havilland Canada Beaver for Army Air Corps	de Havilland Canada Beaver AL.1
D.208D&P		1960	Developed version of Jindivik target drone	GAF Jindivik 102
D.209D&P		1960	Conversion of Gloster Meteor F.8 to pilotless target drones by Flight Refuelling Ltd. Similar to U.16	Gloster Meteor U.21
RH.210		1960	Enlarged, Rolls-Royce Tyne-powered, military transport version of Fairey Rotodyne gyroplane.	Fairey Rotodyne Z
HAS.211T		1960	Initial tender for improved version of Westland Wessex for Royal Navy. Specification developed fully in HAS.227.D&P.	Westland Wessex HAS.3
C.212D&P		1960	de Havilland Comet Mk.4 transport for RAF	de Havilland Comet C.4
C.213D&P		1961	Vickers VC10 transport for RAF	Vickers VC10 C.1
GAR.214D	OR.345	1960	Tactical ground attack and reconnaissance aircraft. Specification issued to Hawker Siddeley. Abandoned by 1963	
UT.215D&P		1962	Training round for Blue Steel without engine or warhead, to be carried by V-bombers for training flights. Unbuilt.	
HAS.216		1961	Small shipboard anti-submarine helicopter. Production version of Saro P.531	Westland Wasp
ER.217			Ground effect research machine to be built by Folland Aircraft. Not progressed.	
MR.218D	OR.350		Maritime patrol aircraft for RAF. Avro Shackleton replacement. Superseded by MR.281/OR.357.	
C.219D&P		1963	VIP transport aircraft – modified Hawker Siddeley HS.748 airliner	Hawker Siddeley Andover
	OR.303	195?	Lightweight fighter to intercept Soviet Tupolev Tu-4 bombers	Folland Midge
FGA.236	GOR.345	195?	V/STOL combat aircraft version of Hawker P.1127 – Harrier development	Hawker Siddeley Kestrel FGA.1
	OR.350	18 July 1960	Maritime patrol aircraft to enter service by 1968	Nimrod MR.1
	OR.351	1960	V/STOL freighter (to NATO Basic Military Requirement NMBR.4)	English Electric P.36
	OR.356	19??	Supersonic V/STOL – Spec. SR.250	Hawker Siddeley P.1154; later cancelled
	OR.357	19??	Maritime reconnaissance aircraft – led to Nimrod	Hawker Siddeley Nimrod
	OR.362	19??	Supersonic trainer aircraft – led to Jaguar	SEPECAT Jaguar
	ASR.365	196?	Helicopter – Tactical Support	Westland Puma
	ASR.367	196?	Bomber – Vulcan B.2 – see also B.35/46	Avro Vulcan B.2
	ASR.368	196?	Bomber – Victor B.2 – see also B.35/46	Handley Page Victor B.2
	ASR.372	196?	Trainer version of Lightning – Lightning T.5	English Electric Lightning T.5
	ASR.373	196?	VIP Transport aircraft – Andover CC.2	Hawker Siddeley Andover CC.2
	ASR.376	196?	Tanker aircraft	Handley Page Victor B(K).1 / Handley Page Victor B(K).1A
C.239	ASR.378	196?	Transport aircraft – VC10	Vickers VC10
	ASR.381	196?	Interim Maritime Patrol aircraft to Spec. MR.254 – written around Atlantique	Breguet Atlantique
	ASR.382	196?	Two-seat trainer version of P.1154 for RAF – cancelled	Hawker Siddeley P.1154
	ASR.384	196?	Harrier requirement – see also GOR.345	Hawker Siddeley Harrier
	ASR.385	196?	Phantom for RAF	McDonnell Douglas F-4M Phantom II
	ASR.397	1970	Basic jet trainer – BAC Jet Provost replacement	BAE Systems Hawk T.1
	ASR.400		Airborne Early Warning Aircraft	Hawker Siddeley Nimrod AEW.3
	ASR.409		Harrier replacement	BAe/McDonnell Douglas AV-8B Harrier GR.5
T.301	AST.412		Jet Provost replacement	Short Tucano T.1
	GOR.2	1959	VTOL Strike Reconnaissance aircraft	English Electric P.31, Gloster P.505

== Naval requirement/Aircraft, Naval Staff requirements ==
Spec	Req.	Year	Type	Related aircraft
U.25/49	NA.03		Small Pilotless Target Aircraft	
N.12/45	NA.07		Single Seat, Long Range, Naval Fighter Aircraft	Westland Wyvern TF.2
N.114T	NA.14		2-seat all-weather day/night fighter	
N.9/47	NA.17	16/09/47	Naval Fighter Aircraft	Supermarine Type 508, 525 and 529 Scimitar prototypes
S.14/48	NA.21	09/07/48	Naval Version of Sikorsky S.51 Helicopter	Westland Dragonfly HR.1
19/48P	NA.27		Production of a Naval Fighter to E.1/45	Supermarine Attacker F.1
	NA.31	195?	Skeeter for RN (A.13/49 Issue 2)	Saunders-Roe Skeeter
M.123	NA.32	195?	Light carrier-borne Anti-submarine warfare aircraft to Spec. M.123	Short Seamew
	NA.34	May 1952	Hooked Swift for Carrier Trials	
	NA.36			de Havilland Sea Vampire T.22
M.148	NA.39	08/02/53	Carrier borne strike aircraft to Spec. M.148T	Armstrong Whitworth AW.168, Blackburn Buccaneer, Short PD.13
	NA.43		Anti-Submarine and General Purpose helicopter	
	NA.47	195?	Mixed rocket-jet interception fighter for Royal Navy	Saunders-Roe SR.177; cancelled 1957
	NSR.6451	19??	V/STOL carrier borne fighter aircraft – Naval Hawker Siddeley Harrier	BAE Sea Harrier

== General Staff Requirements For Aircraft ==
Spec	GSR	Year	Type	Related aircraft
	GSR.3335	196?	Helicopter – Westland Scout replacement	Westland Lynx
	GSR.3336	196?	Helicopter – Bell 47G Sioux replacement	Westland Gazelle

== See also ==
- Operational Requirement (OR)
- British military aircraft designation systems
- General Staff Target – the British Army equivalent
- Specification (technical standard)
- List of Operational Requirements for nuclear weapons
