= Bristol Type 84 Bloodhound =

Bloodhound
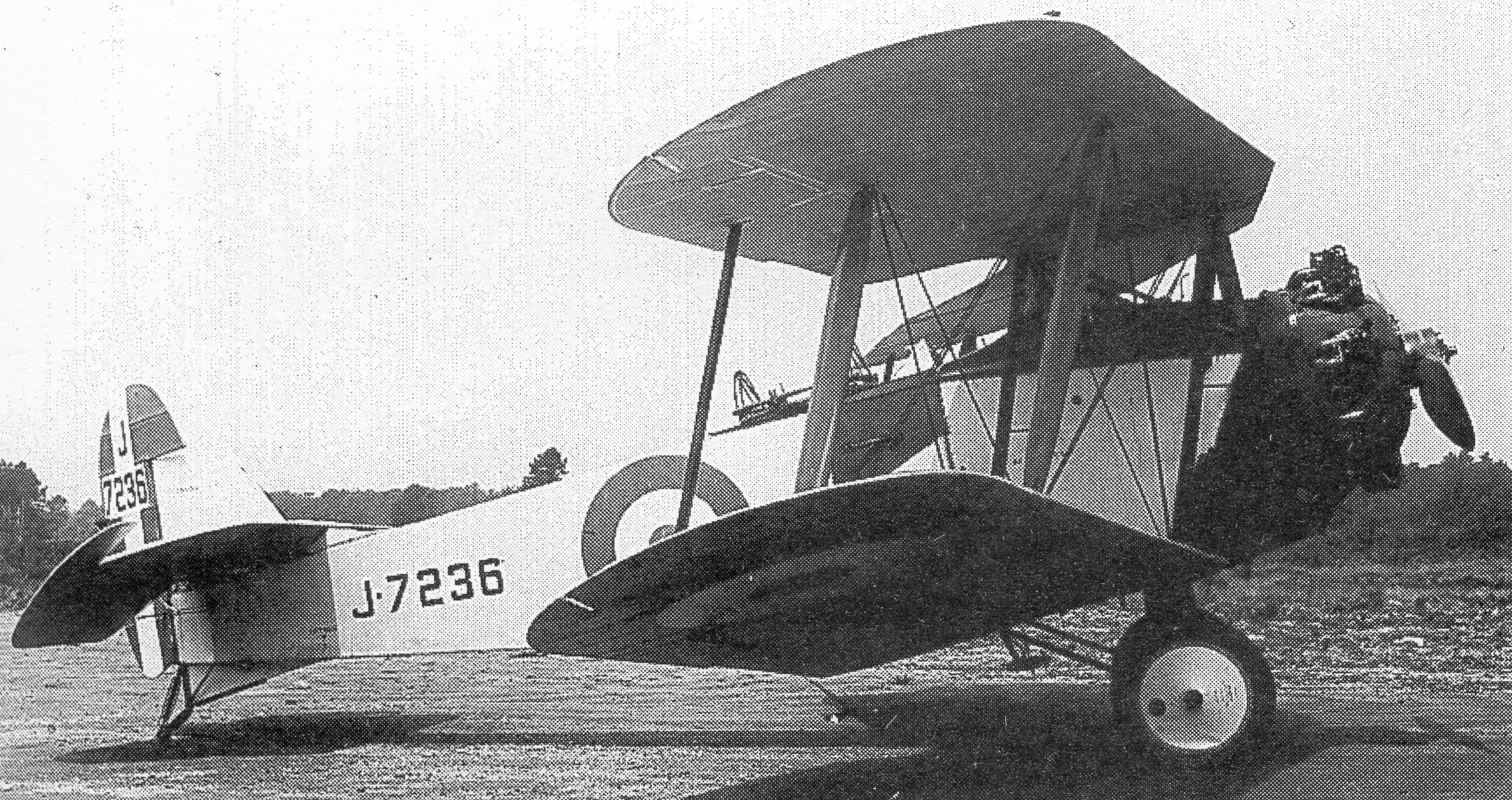

General information
- Type: Fighter/Reconnaissance
- Manufacturer: Bristol Aeroplane Company
- Designer: Wilfred Reid
- Status: Prototype only
- Number built: 4

History
- First flight: May 1923

The Bristol Bloodhound was a British two-seat reconnaissance/fighter aircraft designed and built by the Bristol Aeroplane Company as a possible replacement for the Bristol F.2 Fighter for the Royal Air Force. It was unsuccessful, only four prototypes being built.

== Development and design ==
After the failure of the two-seat version of the Bristol Bullfinch, the requirement remained for an aircraft for the Royal Air Force to replace the Bristol F.2 Fighter. The Air Ministry therefore issued Specification 3/22 in 1922 for a two-seat fighter powered by a supercharged engine. Bristol's chief designer, Wilfred Reid (who had replaced Frank Barnwell when Barnwell emigrated to Australia), designed the Bristol Type 84 Bloodhound to meet this requirement, with Bristol deciding to build a prototype as a private venture.

The Bloodhound was a two-seat biplane with swept two-bay wings, powered by a Bristol Jupiter IV radial engine. It first flew at the end of May 1923. It was redesigned with a lengthened fuselage and revised wings when Frank Barnwell returned from Australia to resume his role as chief designer. The Air Ministry placed an order for three Bloodhounds to a revised specification (22/22), of which one was of all-metal construction and the other two fitted with wooden wings, the first of these flying on 4 February 1925. After evaluation by the Aeroplane and Armament Experimental Establishment at RAF Martlesham Heath and Farnborough, it was clear that the Bloodhound was not adequate for the role of replacing the F.2. The other aircraft being evaluated against the specification to replace the F.2 in the reconnaissance role, the Hawker Duiker, Armstrong Whitworth Wolf and de Havilland D.H.42 Dormouse, were also found lacking.

The first prototype was fitted with a new Jupiter V engine, and received a civil certificate of airworthiness before being flown in the 1925 King's Cup air race. It was then fitted with a Jupiter VI engine and long-range fuel tanks as an engine testbed, proving the reliability of the Jupiter for Imperial Airways before finally being scrapped in 1931.

== Operators ==
United Kingdom

- Bristol Aeroplane Company
- Royal Air Force

== Specifications (Bloodhound) ==
Data from The British Fighter since 1912

General characteristics

- Crew: 2
- Length: 26 ft 6 in (8.08 m)
- Wingspan: 40 ft 2 in (12.24 m)
- Height: 10 ft 8 in (3.25 m)
- Wing area: 494 sq ft (45.9 m^{2})
- Empty weight: 2,515 lb (1,141 kg)
- Gross weight: 4,236 lb (1,921 kg)
- Powerplant: 1 × Bristol Jupiter IV 9-cylinder air-cooled radial piston engine, 425 hp (317 kW)
- Propellers: 2-bladed fixed-pitch propeller

Performance

- Maximum speed: 130 mph (210 km/h, 110 kn)
- Endurance: 3 hours
- Service ceiling: 22,000 ft (6,700 m)
- Wing loading: 8.57 lb/sq ft (41.8 kg/m^{2})
- Power/mass: 0.10 hp/lb (0.16 kW/kg)

Armament

- Guns: 1 × fixed, forward-firing .303 in (7.7 mm) Vickers machine gun and 1 × .303 in (7.7 mm) Lewis gun on a Scarff ring in rear cockpit.
- Bombs: 4 × 20 lb (9 kg) bombs
