= Hawker Duiker =

Duiker
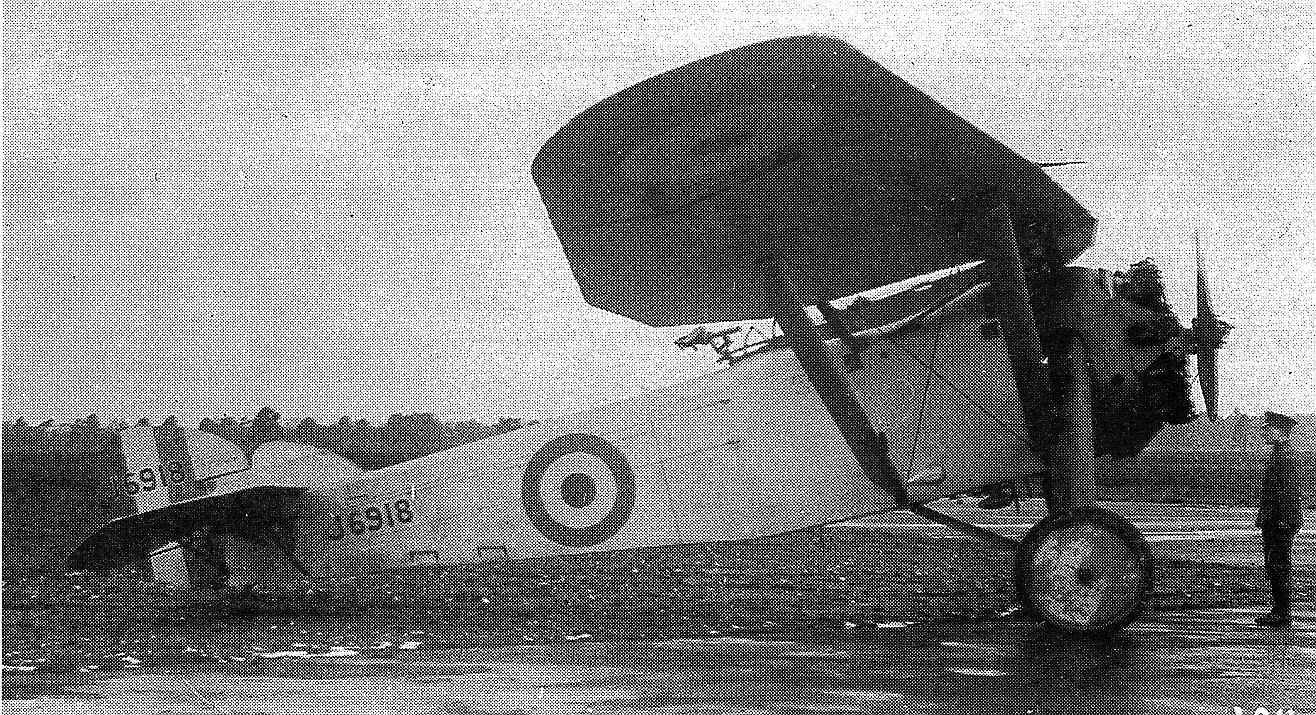

General information
- Type: Reconnaissance
- Manufacturer: H.G. Hawker Engineering Co. Ltd
- Number built: 1

History
- First flight: July 1923

The Hawker Duiker was an unusual and unsuccessful aircraft. It was the first design at Hawker under a new chief designer, Captain Thomson, in 1922. Much of the equipment and parts were proprietary and made by another aircraft company, Vickers, which shared the airfield at Brooklands with Hawker. The Duiker was a parasol wing monoplane in a period where the biplane held sway.

== Design and development ==
The Duiker was designed to meet a requirement for a Corps Reconnaissance aircraft to carry out operations in support of the Army, which eventually was drawn up into Air Ministry Specification 7/22.

The Duiker had an all-wood structure. The wing was slightly swept back, which gave rise to instability at all speeds, and even caused the separation of the wing from the rear struts. The fin was rather small and was typical of Sopwith design in shape. An Armstrong Siddeley Jaguar engine was initially used, but this was later changed to a Bristol Jupiter IV. The first flight took place in July 1923. Only one aircraft was built.

== Specifications ==
Data from Hawker Aircraft since 1920

General characteristics

- Crew: 2
- Length: 31 ft 5 in (9.58 m)
- Wingspan: 48 ft 5 in (14.76 m)
- Height: 10 ft 7 in (3.23 m)
- Wing area: 390 sq ft (36 m^{2})
- Empty weight: 3,956 lb (1,794 kg)
- Gross weight: 4,700 lb (2,132 kg) (design loaded weight: 4,940 lb (2,240 kg))
- Fuel capacity: 94.5 imp gal (113.5 US gal; 430 L)
- Powerplant: 1 × Bristol Jupiter IV 9-cylinder radial engine, 389 hp (290 kW)
- Propellers: 2-bladed wooden

Performance

- Maximum speed: 125 mph (201 km/h, 109 kn) at sea level
- Cruise speed: 99 mph (159 km/h, 86 kn)
- Range: 340 mi (550 km, 300 nmi) at 95 miles per hour (83 kn; 153 km/h)
- Endurance: 3 hr 45 min
- Rate of climb: 490 ft/min (2.5 m/s)

== See also ==
Aircraft of comparable role, configuration, and era

- Armstrong Whitworth Wolf
- Short Springbok
