= Gloster Gnatsnapper =

Prototype British naval fighter biplane

Gnatsnapper
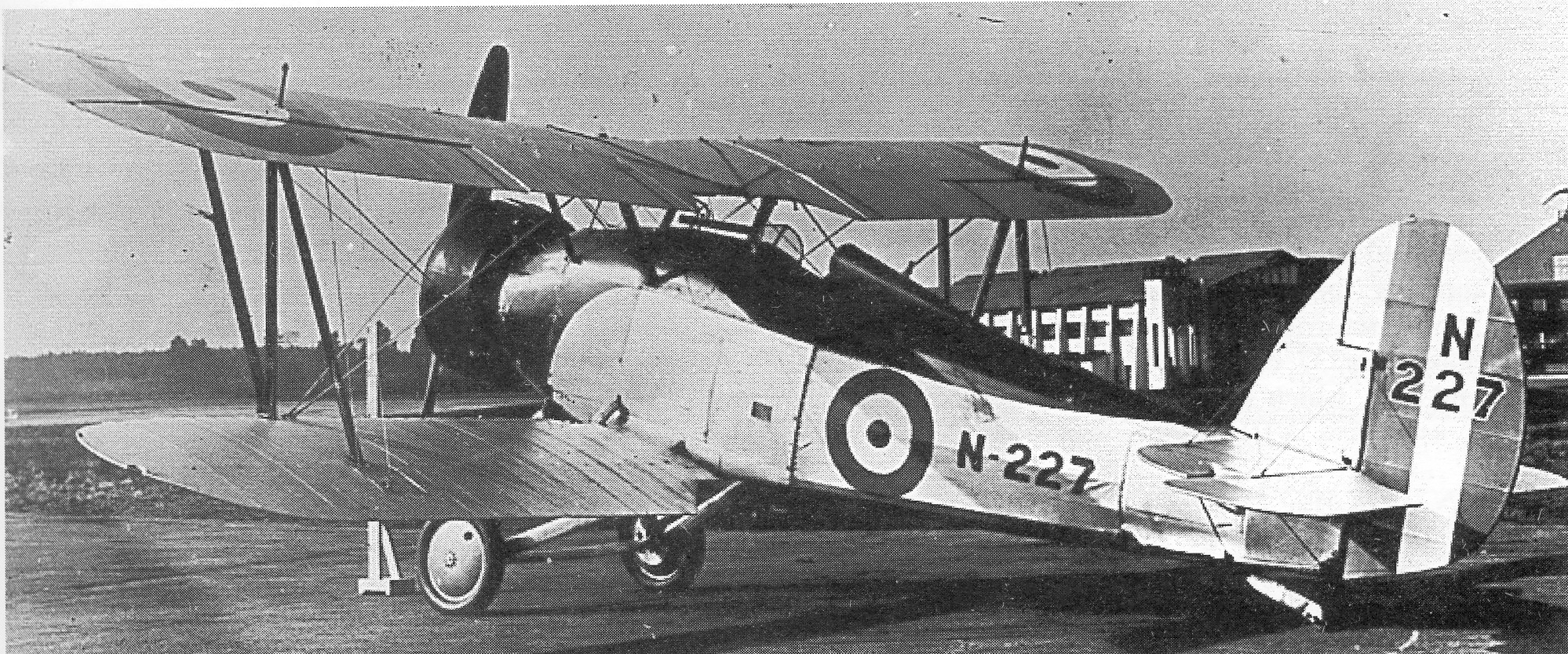

General information
- Type: Fighter
- National origin: United Kingdom
- Manufacturer: Gloster Aircraft
- Designer: Henry Folland
- Status: Prototype only
- Number built: 2

History
- First flight: February 1928

The Gloster SS.35 Gnatsnapper was a British naval biplane fighter design of the late 1920s. Two prototypes were built but the type did not enter production.

== Design and development ==
The Gnatsnapper was a submission to Air Ministry specification N.21/26 for a carrier fighter, which called for an aircraft powered by a Bristol Mercury II engine, capable of at least 160 mph at 10,000 ft. However, when the first available Mercury was delivered to Gloster in September 1927, it was apparent that it would not be satisfactory since it failed to produce the expected output of 450 hp, was 160 lb overweight, and was unreliable. In order to expedite flight trials, work was therefore started on a second prototype (N227) which was fitted with a 450 hp Bristol Jupiter VII engine. The aircraft first flew in this form in February 1928. More examples of the Mercury were delivered during that year and although the aircraft was flown using them, it was obvious that it was still not satisfactory and, having missed the N.21/26 evaluation (in which no type had been declared the winner), the aircraft was refitted with the Jupiter and delivered to the A & AEE for evaluation, which proved entirely successful.

In 1930, a new carrier fighter competition (N16/30) was announced by the Air Ministry, for which Gloster was requested to redesign the Gnatsnapper to use the 540 hp Armstrong Siddeley Jaguar VIII. Designated the Gnatsnapper II, the aircraft was submitted for evaluation but was badly damaged in a landing accident before the trials had been completed, eliminating it from the competition, which was eventually won by the Hawker Nimrod. After repair, the aircraft was substantially modified to accept a 525 hp Rolls-Royce Kestrel IIS evaporatively-cooled engine, with the condensers in the leading edges of the wings, this version being designated the Gnatsnapper III. It was subsequently used by Rolls-Royce as a flying testbed for the ill-fated Goshawk engine, and ended its career as a company hack.

A second prototype (N254) had been ordered in May 1929. This was first flown in the spring of 1930, powered by a Bristol Mercury IIA. This is thought to be the airframe that had been abandoned in 1927 when the Mercury failed to meet expectations. Although an attempt to make this aircraft meet the requirements of N.16/30 was made, the obvious superiority of the Nimrod caused Gloster to stop development work on the type.

== Specifications (Gnatsnapper II) ==
Data from Gloster Aircraft since 1917

General characteristics

- Crew: 1
- Length: 24 ft 7 in (7.49 m)
- Wingspan: 33 ft 6 in (10.21 m)
- Height: 10 ft 11 in (3.33 m)
- Wing area: 360 sq ft (33 m^{2})
- Empty weight: 3,095 lb (1,404 kg)
- Gross weight: 3,804 lb (1,725 kg)
- Powerplant: 1 × Armstrong Siddeley Jaguar VIII 14-cylinder air-cooled radial piston engine, 540 hp (400 kW)
- Propellers: 2-bladed fixed-pitch

Performance

- Maximum speed: 177 mph (285 km/h, 154 kn)
- Stall speed: 53 mph (85 km/h, 46 kn)
- Range: 490 mi (790 km, 430 nmi)
- Endurance: 5 hours
- Service ceiling: 24,500 ft (7,500 m)
- Time to altitude: 20,000 ft (6,100 m) in 19 minutes
- Wing loading: 10.6 lb/sq ft (52 kg/m^{2})
- Power/mass: 0.14 hp/lb (0.23 kW/kg)

Armament

- Guns: 2 x 0.303 in Vickers machine guns

== See also ==
Aircraft of comparable role, configuration, and era

- Armstrong Whitworth Starling
- Hawker Nimrod
