= De Havilland Doncaster =

DH.29 Doncaster
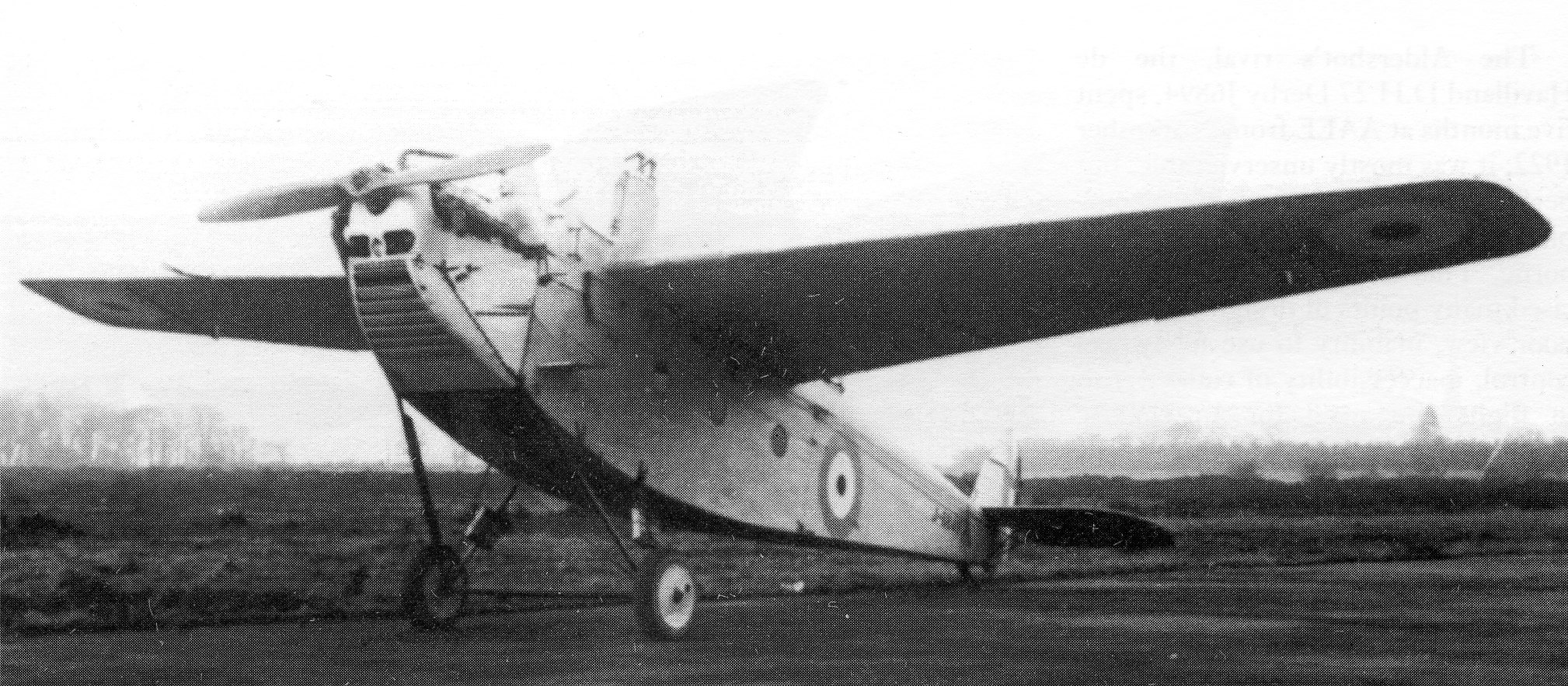
- J6849 in final form

General information
- Type: long-range monoplane
- Manufacturer: de Havilland
- Status: abandoned prototype
- Primary user: Air Ministry
- Number built: 2

History
- First flight: 5 July 1921

The de Havilland DH.29 Doncaster was a British long-range high-wing monoplane of the 1920s built by de Havilland.

== History ==
The DH.29 Doncaster was ordered by the British Air Ministry as an experimental long-range monoplane. The aircraft was a high-wing cantilever monoplane with unswept wings of wooden structure with a fabric covering. It had a box section wooden fuselage with a single fin. The crew of two sat in an open cockpit ahead of the wing. Two aircraft were built between 1920 and 1921 at Stag Lane Aerodrome. Early testing of the first aircraft (Serial J6849) resulted in a redesign of the engine installation. The second aircraft (Registered G-EAYO) was built as a ten-seat commercial aircraft. The airlines were not interested and further development was abandoned, effort being put into the biplane de Havilland DH.34. A proposed military reconnaissance version, the DH.30, was never built. The two aircraft finished their life at RAF Martlesham Heath with tests and trials, particularly on the thick-section cantilever wings. The Doncaster was the first British aircraft to use such wings.

== Operators ==
United Kingdom

- Air Ministry

== Specifications (military version) ==
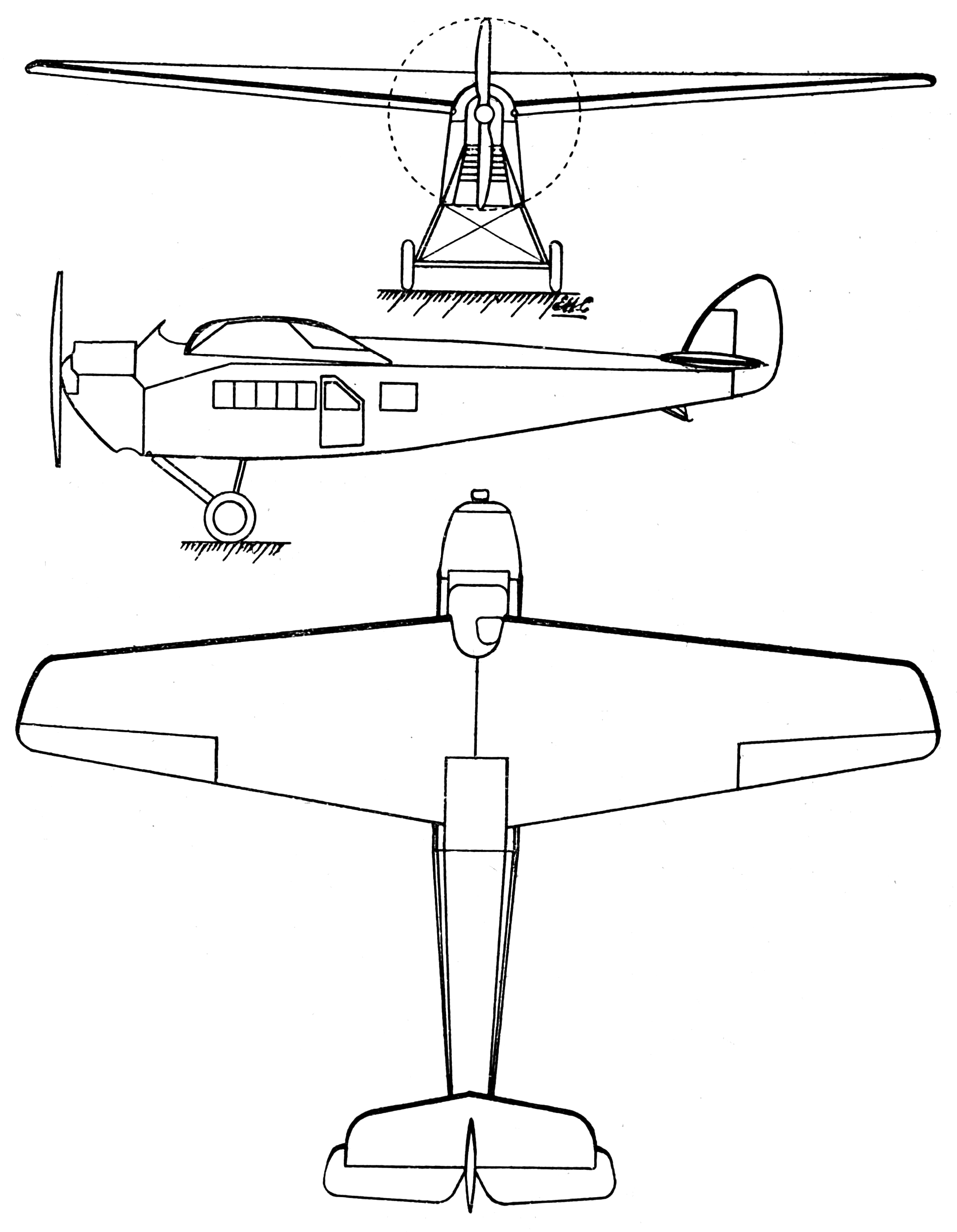
De Havilland DH.29 3-view drawing from Les Ailes, February 2, 1922

Data from de Havilland aircraft since 1909

General characteristics

- Crew: Two
- Capacity: 345 cu ft (9.8 m^{3}) cabin
- Length: 43 ft 0 in (13.11 m)
- Wingspan: 54 ft 0 in (16.46 m)
- Height: 16 ft 6 in (5.03 m)
- Wing area: 440 sq ft (41 m^{2})
- Empty weight: 4,370 lb (1,982 kg)
- Gross weight: 7,500 lb (3,402 kg)
- Fuel capacity: 230 imp gal (276 US gal; 1,046 L) in two leading edge tanks
- Powerplant: 1 × Napier Lion IB W-12 water-cooled piston engine, 450 hp (340 kW)
- Propellers: 2-bladed wood fixed pitch propeller

Performance

- Maximum speed: 116 mph (187 km/h, 101 kn) at 10,000 ft (3,000 m)
- Cruise speed: 100 mph (160 km/h, 87 kn)
- Landing speed: 54 mph (47 kn; 87 km/h)

Armament

- Guns: provision for a Scarff ring mounting .303 in (7.7 mm) machine-guns

== See also ==
- 1921 in aviation

Related lists

- List of aircraft of the Royal Air Force
