= Armstrong Siddeley Jaguar =

1920s British piston aircraft engine

Jaguar
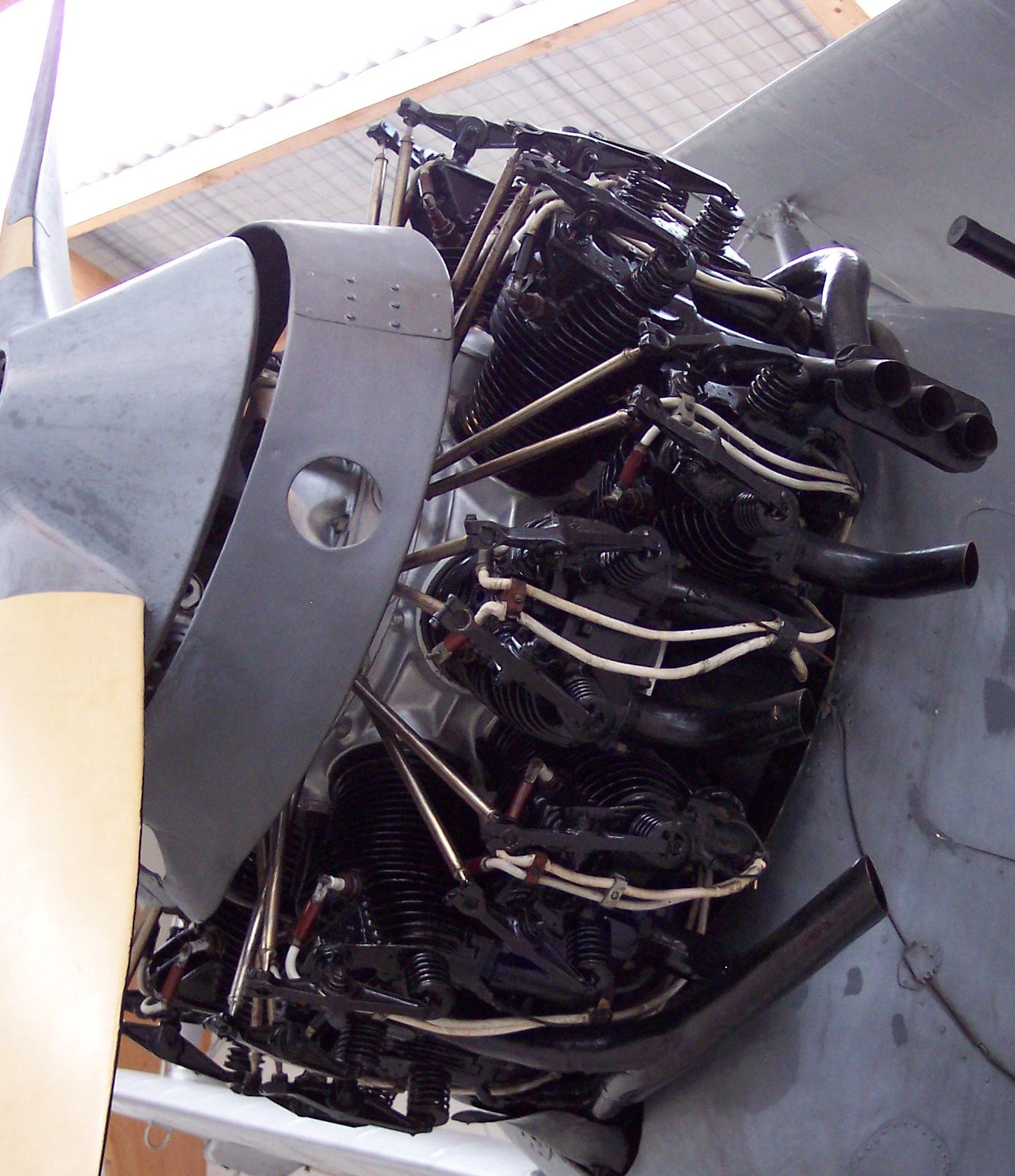
- Armstrong Siddeley Jaguar IV
- Type: Radial engine
- National origin: United Kingdom
- Manufacturer: Armstrong Siddeley
- First run: 21 June 1922

The Armstrong Siddeley Jaguar is an aircraft engine developed by Armstrong Siddeley. The Jaguar was a petrol-fuelled air-cooled 14-cylinder two-row radial engine design. The Jaguar III was first used in 1923, followed in 1925 by the Jaguar IV and in 1927 by the Jaguar VI. In 1925 the Jaguar became the first production aero engine incorporating a geared supercharger.

== Design and development ==
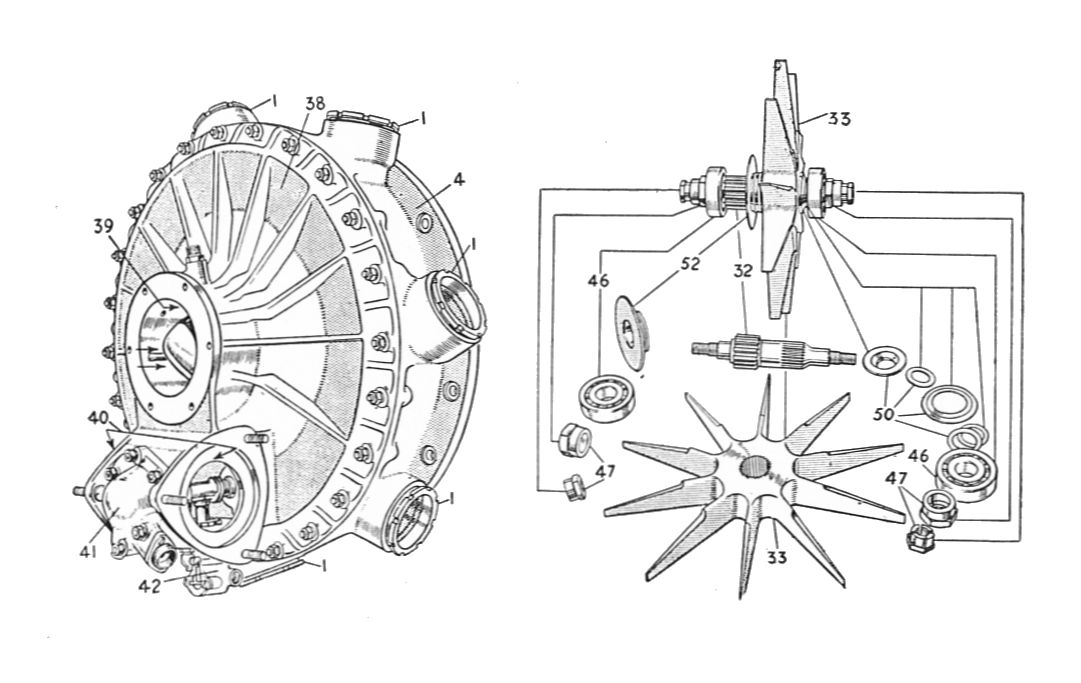
The supercharger rotor and its straight blades

The Jaguar was developed from the Royal Aircraft Factory RAF.8 design proposal of 1916. The RAF.8 was the work of a design team led by F.M. Green, and incorporated the findings of research into aluminium air-cooled cylinders by Samuel D. Heron and Professor A. H. Gibson. Disillusioned by political and press criticism of the Royal Air Factory, Green and his design team, including Heron, left the Factory in January 1917 and took up positions with the Siddeley-Deasy company. There they were required by official policy to suspend work on the RAF.8 and focus efforts to get the unreliable Siddeley Puma into effective service, an engine that had been ordered in large numbers despite a lack of testing. As a result, the RAF.8 design, then known as the Jaguar, was not run until 21 June 1922.

Initial performance was not as expected; as a result the stroke was increased to 5.5 in (139.7 mm) on all variants after the Jaguar I. By that time, the engine had been fitted with a gear-driven supercharger. Throughout its career the Jaguar suffered from vibration due to the lack of a crankshaft centre bearing. The most powerful version of the engine, the Jaguar VIC, produced a maximum of 490 hp (365 kW) on takeoff at 1,950 rpm and weighed 910 lb (413 kg). The later Lynx was designed using one row of Jaguar cylinders.

== Variants ==
Jaguar I
1922, 300 hp (220 kW).
Jaguar II
1923, 385 hp (287 kW), increased stroke, capacity 1,512 cu in (24.8 L).
Jaguar III
1923, 385 hp (287 kW).
Jaguar IIIA
1923, 380 hp (280 kW).
Jaguar IV
1925, 385 hp (287 kW), twin carburettors
Jaguar IVA
420 hp (310 kW), Geared propeller drive.
Jaguar IVC
1928, 400 hp (300 kW), revised connecting rod design, enclosed valve gear.
Jaguar IV(S)
1925, 365 hp (272 kW), fully supercharged. (Note: MS and FS refer to the supercharger blower speeds: Moderate/Fully Supercharged. Moderate Supercharging referred to low- to medium-altitudes operation, Full Supercharging to medium- to high-altitude operation)
Jaguar V
1928.
Jaguar VI
1927.
Jaguar VI(S)
1928, supercharged version of Jaguar VI.
Jaguar VIC
1927, 470 hp (350 kW), geared propeller drive version of Jaguar VI.
Jaguar VID
1928.
Jaguar VIIA
1929, 400 hp (300 kW), fully supercharged.
Jaguar VIII
1928, 405 hp (302 kW), fully supercharged, geared propeller drive

== Applications ==
- Airco DH.4
- Airco DH.9
- Armstrong Whitworth Ajax
- Armstrong Whitworth Aries
- Armstrong Whitworth Argosy
- Armstrong Whitworth Atlas
- Armstrong Whitworth Siskin
- Armstrong Whitworth Starling
- Armstrong Whitworth Wolf
- Avro 642
- Blackburn Airedale
- Blackburn C.A.15C
- Blackburn Turcock
- Boulton Paul P.71
- De Havilland Dormouse
- De Havilland DH.50
- De Havilland Giant Moth
- De Havilland Hyena
- Fairey Ferret
- Fairey Flycatcher
- Fokker C.V
- Fokker D.XVI
- Gloster Gnatsnapper
- Gloster Grebe
- Handley Page Hampstead
- Hawker Danecock
- Hawker Hawfinch
- Hawker Hoopoe
- Hawker Woodcock
- Larkin Lascowl
- Martinsyde ADC 1
- Nieuport Nighthawk
- Parnall Plover
- RAAF Experimental Section Warrigal II
- Supermarine Air Yacht
- Supermarine Nanok
- Supermarine Southampton
- Svenska Aero Jaktfalken (SA-11)
- Vickers Vellore
- Vickers Vespa
- Vickers Viastra
- Vickers Vimy Trainer (Type 156)
- Westland Wapiti
- Westland Weasel

== Engines on display ==
A preserved Armstrong Siddeley Jaguar is on public display at the Science Museum (London).

== Specifications (Jaguar I) ==
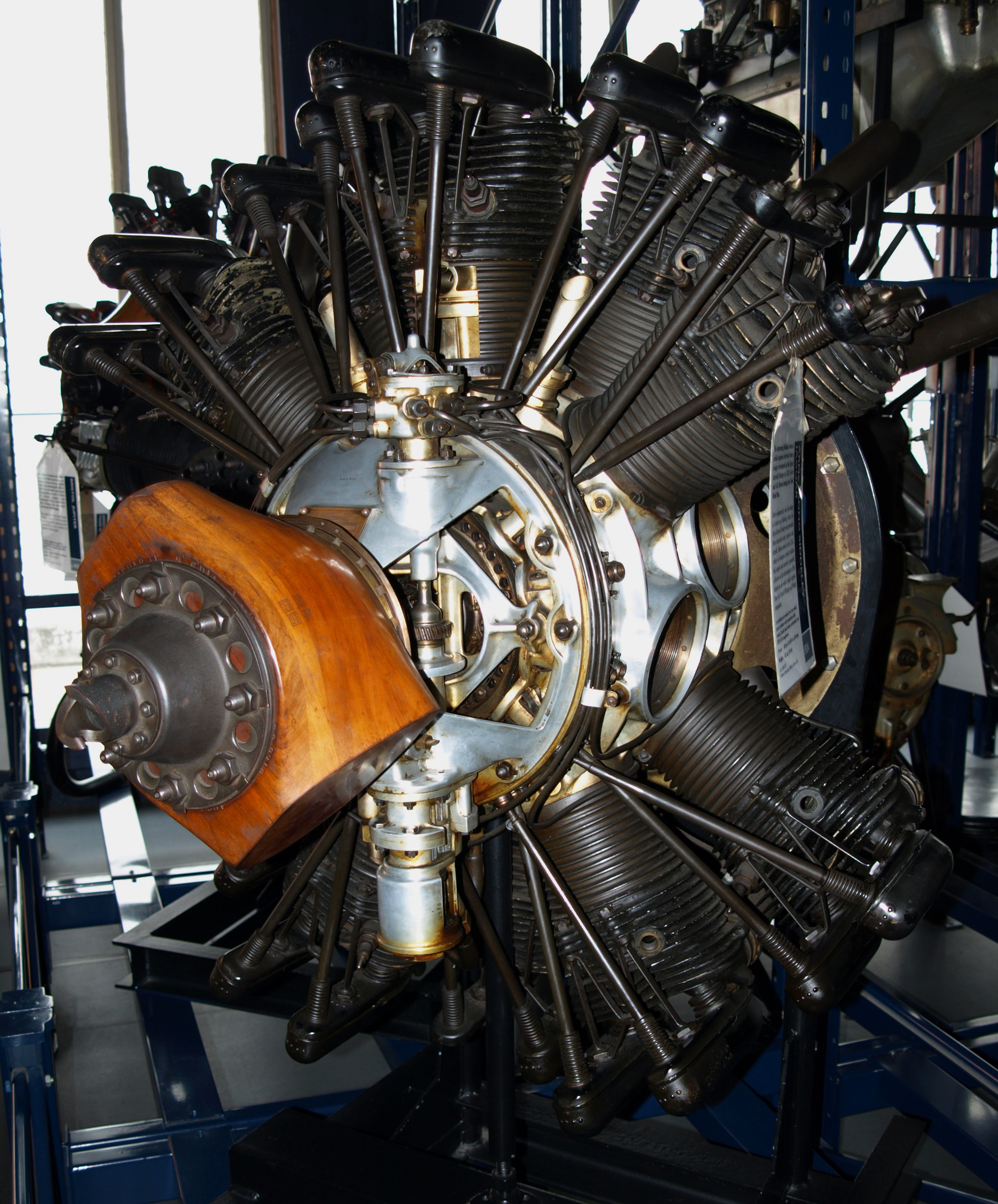
Sectioned Armstrong Siddeley Jaguar on display at the Science Museum (London)

Data from Lumsden

=== General characteristics ===
- Type: 14-cylinder 2-row radial engine
- Bore: 5 in (127 mm)
- Stroke: 5 in (127 mm)
- Displacement: 1,375 cu in (22.5 L)
- Length: 41 in (1,041 mm)
- Diameter: 43 in (1,092 mm)
- Dry weight: 710 lb (322 kg)

=== Components ===
- Supercharger: Gear driven
- Fuel system: Carburettor
- Cooling system: Air-cooled

=== Performance ===
- Power output: 300 hp (220 kW)
- Compression ratio: 5:1
- Fuel consumption: 19 imp gal/h (86 L/h) at cruise
- Power-to-weight ratio: 0.42 hp/lb (700 W/kg)

== See also ==
Related development

- Armstrong Siddeley Lynx

Comparable engines

- Cosmos Mercury
- Bristol Jupiter

Related lists

- List of aircraft engines
