= Armstrong Whitworth Wolf =

British reconnaissance aircraft

Wolf
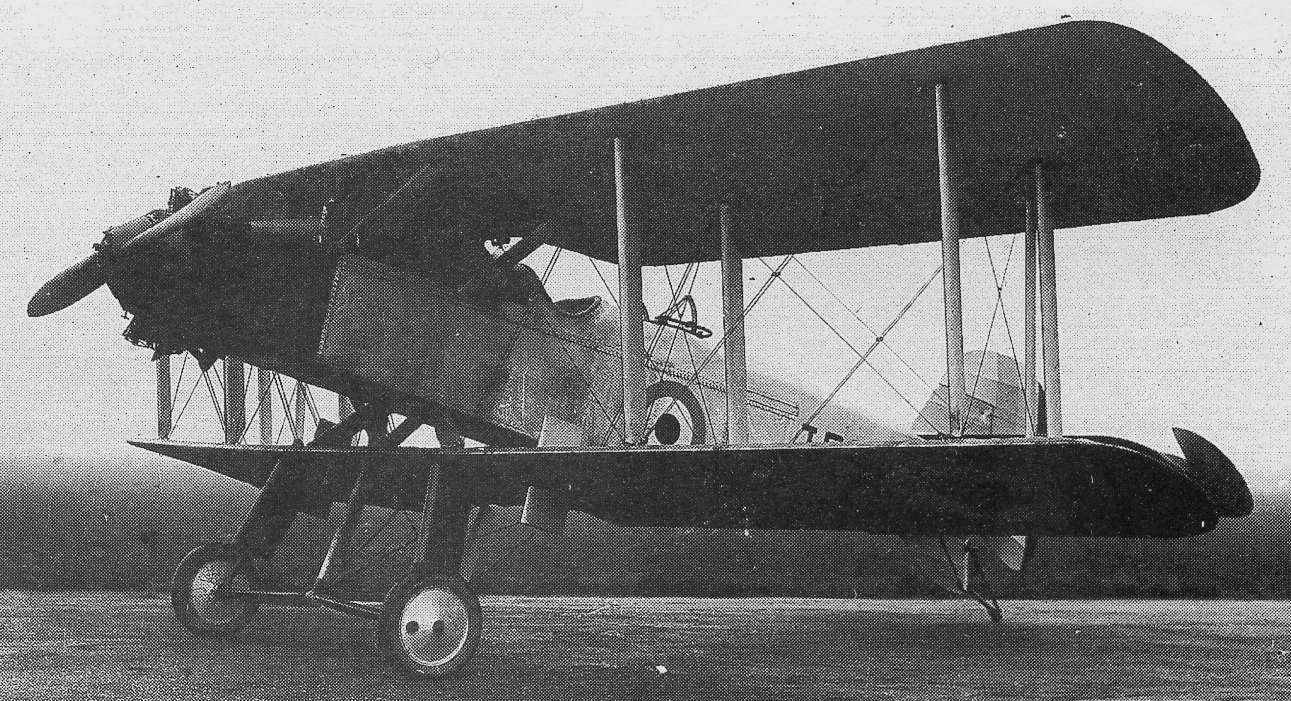

General information
- Type: Trainer
- Manufacturer: Armstrong Whitworth Aircraft
- Primary users: Royal Air Force Royal Aircraft Establishment
- Number built: 6

History
- Manufactured: 1923-1929
- Introduction date: 1923
- First flight: 19 January 1923
- Retired: 1931

The Armstrong Whitworth Wolf was a British two-seat reconnaissance aircraft ordered by the Royal Air Force in 1923.

== Design and development ==
The Wolf was a two-bay biplane of unorthodox design, with the fuselage mounted between the two sets of wings. No production order was placed, and the three machines built served their days at the Royal Aircraft Establishment at Farnborough as experimental testbeds.

Alongside the RAF's order in 1923, Armstrong Whitworth also built two for the RAF Reserve Flying School at Whitley, and a final, sixth aircraft in 1929. As trainers, they proved popular with pilots, although less so with ground crews for whom the rigging and undercarriage were awkward to maintain.

All Wolves were retired from service in 1931 and all but the most recently built were scrapped. The final aircraft was taken to Hamble for use as an instructional airframe.

== Operators ==
United Kingdom

- Royal Air Force
- Royal Aircraft Establishment

== Specifications (Wolf) ==
Data from Armstrong Whitworth Aircraft since 1913

General characteristics

- Crew: 2
- Length: 31 ft 0 in (9.45 m)
- Wingspan: 39 ft 10 in (12.14 m)
- Height: 13 ft 0 in (3.96 m)
- Wing area: 488 sq ft (45.3 m^{2})
- Empty weight: 2,690 lb (1,220 kg)
- Gross weight: 4,090 lb (1,855 kg)
- Powerplant: 1 × Armstrong Siddeley Jaguar III 14-cylinder two-row air-cooled radial engine, 350 hp (260 kW)

Performance

- Maximum speed: 110 mph (180 km/h, 96 kn) at 10,000 ft (3,000 m)
- Endurance: 3 hr 45 min
- Service ceiling: 15,150 ft (4,620 m)
- Time to altitude:
  - 1.3 min to 1,000 ft (300 m)
  - 6.5 min to 5,000 ft (1,500 m)

Armament

- Guns:
  - 1 × fixed, forward-firing .303 in (7.7 mm) Vickers machine gun
  - 1 × .303 in (7.7 mm) Lewis Gun in Scarff ring for observer

== See also ==
Related lists

- List of aircraft of the Royal Air Force
