= Blackburn F.3 =

Type of aircraft

F.3

General information
- Type: Fighter
- National origin: United Kingdom
- Manufacturer: Blackburn Aircraft
- Designer: George Edward Petty
- Status: Prototype only
- Number built: 1

History
- Introduction date: 1934
- First flight: not flown

The Blackburn F.3 (also called the Blackburn F.7/30) was a British single-engined fighter aircraft produced in response to Air Ministry Specification F.7/30.

== Design and development ==
Following the release of Air Ministry Specification F.7/30 for a single-seat day and night fighter, eight companies proposed twelve designs and three, including Blackburn Aircraft, received contracts to produce a prototype. Blackburn's design, the F.3, was a single-bay biplane of unequal wingspan and with an unusual configuration, the upper wing being mounted approximately halfway up the stressed-skin fuselage and the lower wing about two feet below it, the gap being occupied by an enclosure for the condenser of the evaporatively-cooled Goshawk III engine. The undercarriage was attached to the front spar of the lower wing, with diagonal struts transmitting the landing loads to the fuselage longerons. The wheels were fitted with spats but these were later removed. Four Vickers machine-guns were fuselage mounted, two in mid-position on the fuselage and the other two on either side of the top of the condenser housing.

== Operational history ==
Taxiing trials of the F.3 began on 20 July 1934 but the combination of a short fuselage and a high centre of gravity made it difficult to manoeuvre on the ground and the engine suffered from cooling problems. Further development was stopped when, after an inspection revealed damage to the rear fuselage resulting from the taxiing trials, the Air Ministry withdrew support for the project since the aircraft would have been too delayed to take part in the trials. Following evaluation of F.7/30 designs an order was placed for the Gloster Gladiator.

== Specifications ==
Data from The British Fighter since 1912

General characteristics

- Crew: one
- Length: 27 ft 0 in (8.22 m)
- Wingspan: 36 ft 10.75 in (9.02 m)
- Height: 10 ft 0 in (3.05 m)
- Empty weight: 2,500 lb (1,133 kg)
- Gross weight: 3,960 lb (1,794 kg)
- Powerplant: 1 × Rolls-Royce Goshawk III V-12 evaporatively cooled , 695 hp (519 kW)

Performance

- Maximum speed: 180 mph (290 km/h, 160 kn) (estimated) at 14,500 ft.

Armament

- 4 synchronised Vickers MkIII .303 machine guns, 200 rounds per gun

== See also ==
Aircraft of comparable role, configuration, and era

- Armstrong Whitworth Scimitar
- Bristol Type 123
- Bristol Type 133
- Gloster Gladiator
- Hawker P.V.3
- Supermarine Type 224
- Westland F.7/30
