= Westland F.7/30 =

Type of aircraft

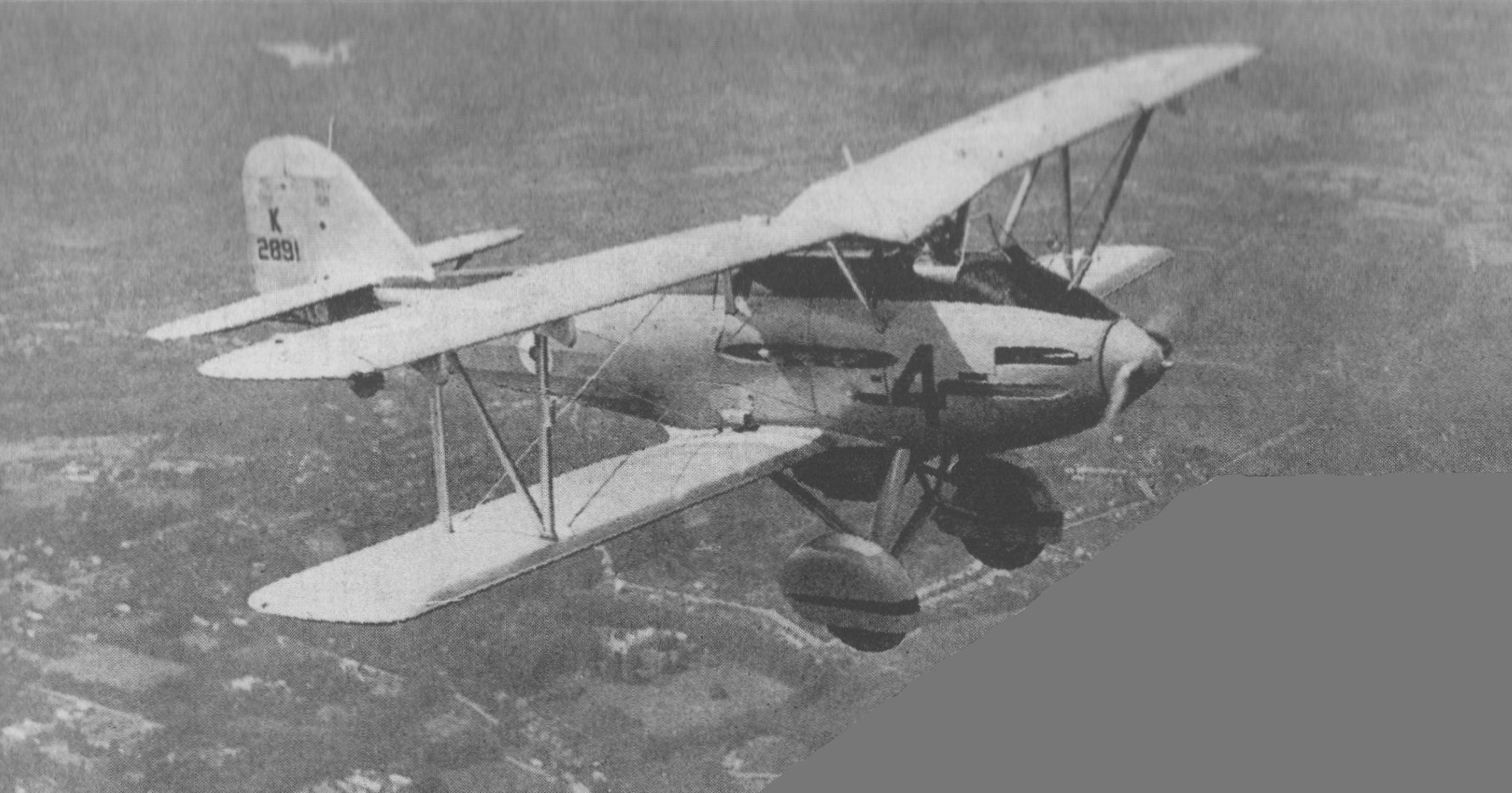
- First public display at Hendon, June 1934

General information
- Type: Fighter
- National origin: United Kingdom
- Manufacturer: Westland Aircraft
- Designer: Arthur Davenport
- Number built: 1

History
- First flight: 1934

The Westland F.7/30 (or Westland PV.4) was a British fighter prototype. A single prototype was built in 1934, but the type was not put in production because its performance fell far below the RAF's requirements. The Gloster Gladiator won the F.7/30 competition.

== Development ==
The Westland F.7/30 was designed in response to Air Ministry Specification F.7/30, which was formally issued in October 1931 and subsequently amended many times. It called for a day and night fighter with an armament of four .303-in (7.7-mm) machine guns, a top speed of at least 195 mph (314 km/h), a high rate of climb, and a low landing speed. Although the specification did not request the use of the Rolls-Royce Goshawk evaporatively-cooled engine, the Air Ministry informally expressed a strong preference for its use and all of the design proposals selected by them for building as prototypes used it. The specification stressed the importance of a good "fighting view" from the cockpit and suggested a low-wing monoplane design as one possible solution to this problem. Another idea suggested was a pusher configuration

The designer of the Westland F.7/30, Arthur Davenport, initially opted for a monoplane with the engine buried in the fuselage over the wing centre section, driving a tractor propeller through a long extension shaft. This put the pilot in front of and slightly above the engine, so that he also had an excellent forward view. Concerns about a possibly high landing speed resulted in the conversion of the design to a biplane with a gull wing configuration for the upper wing.

In this form the F.7/30 was completed in 1934. It was an elegant, if unconventional biplane. The gulled upper wing and the straight lower wing were connected by N struts and braced by wires. The landing gear was fixed, with main wheels covered by spats. From his high position the pilot had an excellent view forwards, upwards and to the sides, as the cockpit was ahead of the wing leading edge. Initially the cockpit was open, but in two stages this was converted into a fully enclosed cockpit. The machine guns were installed in the cockpit's side walls, two on each side.

The initial tail configuration was unusual, the rudder hinge line being vertical when the aircraft was on the ground rather than when in flight. It was hoped that this would improve its effectiveness on the ground, but after testing the aircraft received a larger tailfin of more conventional design.

The engine was a Rolls-Royce Goshawk III or IIS, cooled by a radiator that was installed ventrally, aft of the legs of the fixed undercarriage. The position of the engine put the exhausts between the wings, behind and below the cockpit.

The performance of the Westland F.7/30, first flown from RAF Andover, fell far short of the F.7/30 specifications: A figure is often given of 185 mph (298 km/h) at 15,000 feet (4,600 meters) but flight test data of July 1935 revealed that the top speed was a disappointing 146 mph (235 km/h) at 10,000 feet (3,000 m), nearly 100 mph (160 km/h) slower than the Gloster Gladiator that emerged as the winner of the F.7/30 competition. It also needed 18.8 minutes to reach 20,000 feet (6,100 m), and in view of these disappointing performance figures the type was abandoned.

== Specifications ==
Data from British Flight Testing Martlesham Heath 1920-1939, Westland Aircraft since 1915

General characteristics

- Crew: 1
- Length: 29 ft 6 in (8.99 m)
- Wingspan: 38 ft 6 in (11.73 m)
- Height: 10 ft 9 in (3.28 m)
- Wing area: 370 sq ft (34 m^{2})
- Empty weight: 3,861 lb (1,751 kg)
- Gross weight: 5,207 lb (2,362 kg)
- Powerplant: 1 × Rolls-Royce Goshawk IIS V-12 evaporatively-cooled piston engine, 602 hp (449 kW) at 2,600 rpm
- Propellers: 2-bladed fixed-pitch propeller

Performance

- Maximum speed: 146 mph (235 km/h, 127 kn) at 10,000 ft (3,048 m)
- Rate of climb: 1,000 ft/min (5.1 m/s) at 15,000 ft (4,572 m)

Armament

- Guns: 4x .303 Vickers Mk.III machine guns

== See also ==
Aircraft of comparable role, configuration, and era

- Blackburn F3
- Bristol Type 123
- Bristol Type 133
- Gloster Gladiator
- Hawker P.V.3
- Supermarine Type 224

Related lists

- List of Air Ministry Specifications
