= Supermarine Type 224 =

British prototype fighter

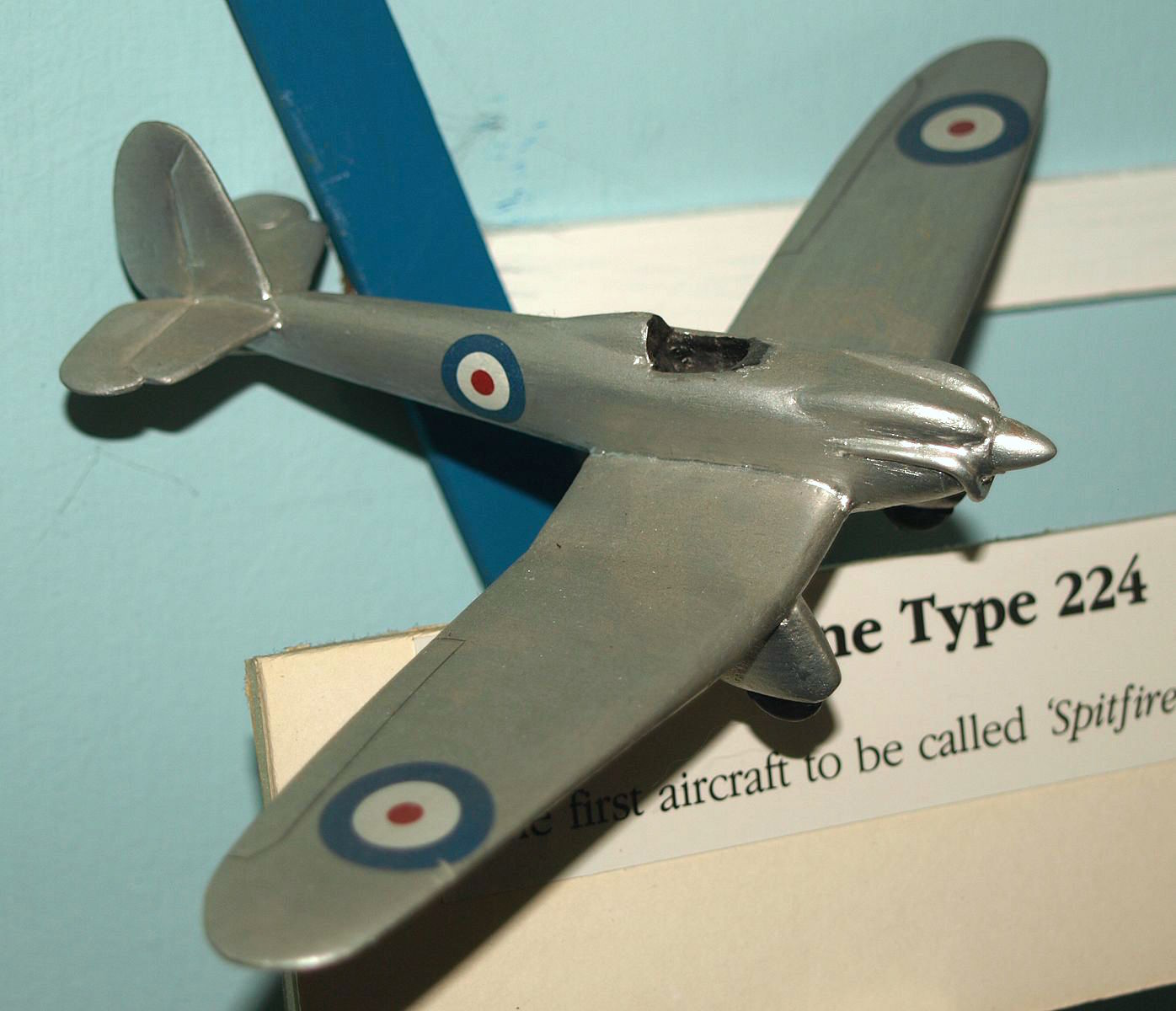
- Model of the Supermarine 224

General information
- Other name(s): Spitfire (not officially adopted)
- Type: Fighter aircraft
- National origin: United Kingdom
- Manufacturer: Supermarine
- Designer: Team led by R. J. Mitchell
- Owners: Royal Air Force
- Number built: 1

History
- First flight: 19 February 1934
- Fate: Destroyed in 1937 (target practice)

The Supermarine Type 224 was a British gull-wing monoplane fighter aircraft designed by R.J. Mitchell at Supermarine in response to Air Ministry Specification F.7/30, which sought to introduce a new fighter to succeed the Gloster Gauntlet. The Type 224 was powered by a Rolls-Royce Goshawk engine, which used an experimental evaporative cooling system.

Problems with the cooling system, combined with its disappointing performance during trials, led to the Type 224 being rejected by the Air Ministry, a contract for production aircraft eventually going to the Gloster Gladiator. The type is nevertheless notable because Mitchell learnt lessons from its design that were to contribute to his success with the Supermarine Spitfire.

== Design and development ==
=== Air Ministry Specification F.7/30 ===
Air Ministry Specification F.7/30, which developed from O.R.1, was formally issued to the British aircraft industry in October 1931, called for an all-metal day and night fighter aircraft armed with four machine guns, a high maximum speed and rate of climb, and a landing speed of less than 60 miles per hour (97 km/h). The importance of good visibility from the cockpit was specified. Although the use of any suitable engine was permitted, the Air Ministry expressed a preference for the Rolls-Royce Goshawk, then still being developed. (Note: See Price's The Spitfire Story for the full text of Specification F.7/30.) Designs tendered to the specification came from Bristol, Hawker, Westland, Blackburn and Supermarine

Of the proposals submitted by British aircraft manufacturers, three were officially selected to produce prototypes for the Air MInistry, Supermarine (the Type 224), Blackburn (Blackburn F.3), and Westland (Westland F.7/30). Hawker had both its biplane and monoplane designs rejected but built the Hawker P.V.3, as a private venture, similarly Bristol had three rejected and built both the Bristol Type 123 biplane and Bristol Type 133 (a monoplane) with its own money. Gloster had not tendered a submission as they were engaged on the Gloster Gauntlet, but later built their private venture Gloster SS.37 using Hawker construction techniques to improve their Gauntlet design.

As a result of the success of Supermarine during the Schneider Trophy contests, Supermarine's chief designer R. J. Mitchell was confident that he could design a highspeed fighter. Less than four months after receiving the specification, Supermarine tendered a monoplane design, the Type 224.

=== Mitchell's design ===
Mitchell's design for the Type 224 included an inverted gull-wing, chosen in order to shorten the undercarriage legs and so reduce drag. He chose a thick airfoil for the wing, in contrast to the type of airfoil for the Schneider Trophy racers.

The fixed landing gear were encased in large fairings. The fuselage was of monocoque construction, with one pair of guns mounted either side of the cockpit and the other pair in the 'trouser' fairings of the undercarriage, which was fixed.

The wing had a single main spar. The engine cooling system's condensers formed the wing's entire leading edge, the combination of the two producing a 'D-box' spar that had a high torsional stiffness. Behind the main spar the wing was fabric-covered.

The Type 224 was powered by the 600 horsepower (450 kW) Goshawk II. The evaporative cooling system used by the Goshawk involved allowing the cooling water to reach a temperature greater than 100 °C (212 °F) without boiling by keeping it under pressure while circulating through the engine: this superheated water was then allowed to boil off by releasing the pressure, the resulting steam then being cooled in a condenser, collected as water and then recirculated through the engine. The system had been experimentally flown in other aircraft, but these were all biplanes, and the condensers and collector tank for the condensed water were all mounted in the upper wing. In the Type 224 the collector tanks were in the undercarriage fairings, and, as the condensed water was nearly at boiling point, it was liable to turn to steam under any slight change of pressure; this frequently occurred in the water pumps and would cause them to stop working.

=== Tests and subsequent development ===
Mitchell was not a proponent of the use of wind tunnel tests, but the Vickers wind tunnel was used to test aspects of the design of the Type 224, and the results obtained indicated the superiority of a gull-wing design. Wind-tunnel tests were carried out on a full-size model of the open cockpit area to ensure that the pilot would not be subjected to undue buffeting due to the design of the windscreen.

Supermarine submitted information on the predicted performance of the Type 224 to the Air Ministry based on the wind-tunnel data, which suggested that the aircraft would perform well, and in response, the ministry issued a production contact for a prototype. The Type 224 first flew on 19 February 1934, piloted by "Mutt" Summers. Its performance was disappointing—the maximum speed was 228 miles per hour (367 km/h) and it took 9.5 minutes to climb to 15,000 ft (4,600 m), well below the predicted performance of a 245 miles per hour (394 km/h) speed and climb to 15,000 ft (4,600 m) in 6.6 minutes. The wing design created issues with lateral stability, and further wind-tunnel tests were carried out before the design was finalised, when Mitchell enlarged the fin.

=== Fate ===
Mitchell was in discussions about a number of improvements to the Type 224—a new wing, tailplane, and engine arrangements—which would give it a top speed of 265 miles per hour (426 km/h), but the Air Ministry decided that a new aircraft, rather than a modification of the Type 224, was called for. In 1933. In January 1935, further construction was cancelled. Mitchell was disappointed in the Type 224’s under-performance, and came to doubt the reliability of the data produced by wind-tunnel tests.

Gloster's private venture was ordered in mid-1935 as the Gladiator to equip the expanding RAF.

On 25 May 1937 the aircraft was transferred to the Aeroplane and Armament Experimental Establishment at RAF Martlesham Heath. It ended its career during the summer of 1937, when it was used as for target practice at Orford Ness, Suffolk.

== Legacy ==
The failure of the Type 224, coming soon after the Schneider racer successes, did not cause Mitchell to lose faith in his ability to design a fighter. He completely redesigned the type, producing a new design with straight wings and a thinner airfoil shape.

The Air Ministry quickly realized that Mitchell’s new design was a new airplane. It wanted a fighter designed by Mitchell and his team, and in January 1935 it issued Specification F.37/34, for the sole purpose of covering a new design by Supermarine. The specification, essentially an addendum to specification F.7/30 mentioning Supermarines specification 425a and drawing, led on to the design of the Supermarine Spitfire.

Supermarine had asked the Air Ministry for the name Spitfire to be reserved for the type. The name was adopted, but Mitchell disliked it, and the use of it for the Type 224 was later dropped.

== Specifications (Supermarine Type 224) ==
Data from Supermarine Aircraft since 1914.

General characteristics

- Crew: 1
- Length: 29 ft 5 1/4 in (8.973 m)
- Wingspan: 45 ft 10 in (13.97 m)
- Height: 11 ft 11 in (3.63 m)
- Wing area: 295 sq ft (27.4 m^{2})
- Airfoil: root: NACA 0018; tip: RAF 34
- Empty weight: 3,422 lb (1,552 kg)
- Gross weight: 4,743 lb (2,151 kg)
- Powerplant: 1 × Rolls-Royce Goshawk II V-12 evaporative/steam cooled piston engine, 600 hp (450 kW)
- Propellers: 2-bladed fixed-pitch propeller

Performance

- Maximum speed: 228 mph (367 km/h, 198 kn) at 15,000 ft (4,600 m)
- Service ceiling: 38,800 ft (11,800 m) Absolute ceiling
- Time to altitude: 15,000 ft (4,600 m) in 9 minutes 30 seconds

Armament

- Guns: 4× 0.303 in (7.7 mm) Vickers Mk IV machine-guns

== See also ==
Aircraft of comparable role, configuration, and era

- Arado Ar 80
- Blackburn F3
- Bristol Type 123
- Bristol Type 133
- Dewoitine D.500
- Gloster Gladiator
- Gloster SS.19
- Hawker P.V.3
- Westland F.7/30

== Sources ==
- Ackroyd, J.A.D. (2018). "Aerodynamics as the Basis of Aviation: How Well Did It Do?" (PDF). Journal of Aeronautical History (1). Royal Aeronautical Society.
- Anderson, John D. (2018). "Design for Speed: R. J. Mitchell and the Spitfire". The Grand Designers: The Evolution of the Airplane in the 20th Century. Cambridge, UK: Cambridge University Press. ISBN 978-05119-7-756-5.
- Andrews, C. F. & Morgan, Eric B. (1981). Supermarine Aircraft since 1914. London: Putnam. ISBN 978-0-370-10018-0.
- Buttler, Tony (2004). Fighters & Bombers, 1935–1950. British Secret Projects. Vol. III. Hinckley, UK: Midlands Publishing. ISBN 978-1-85780-179-8.
- Halley, James J.; Sturtivant, Ray, eds. (1996). "Operational Requirements". Aeromilitaria (4). Air Britain: 87–106. ISSN 0262-8791.
- Price, Alfred (2002). The Spitfire Story (2nd ed.). Silverdale: Enderby. ISBN 0-85368-861-3.
- Sinnott, Colin (2001). The RAF and Aircraft Design, 1923-1939: Air Staff Operational Requirements. London; Portland, Oregon: Frank Cass. ISBN 978-07146-5-158-3.
