= Gloster TC.33 =

TC.33
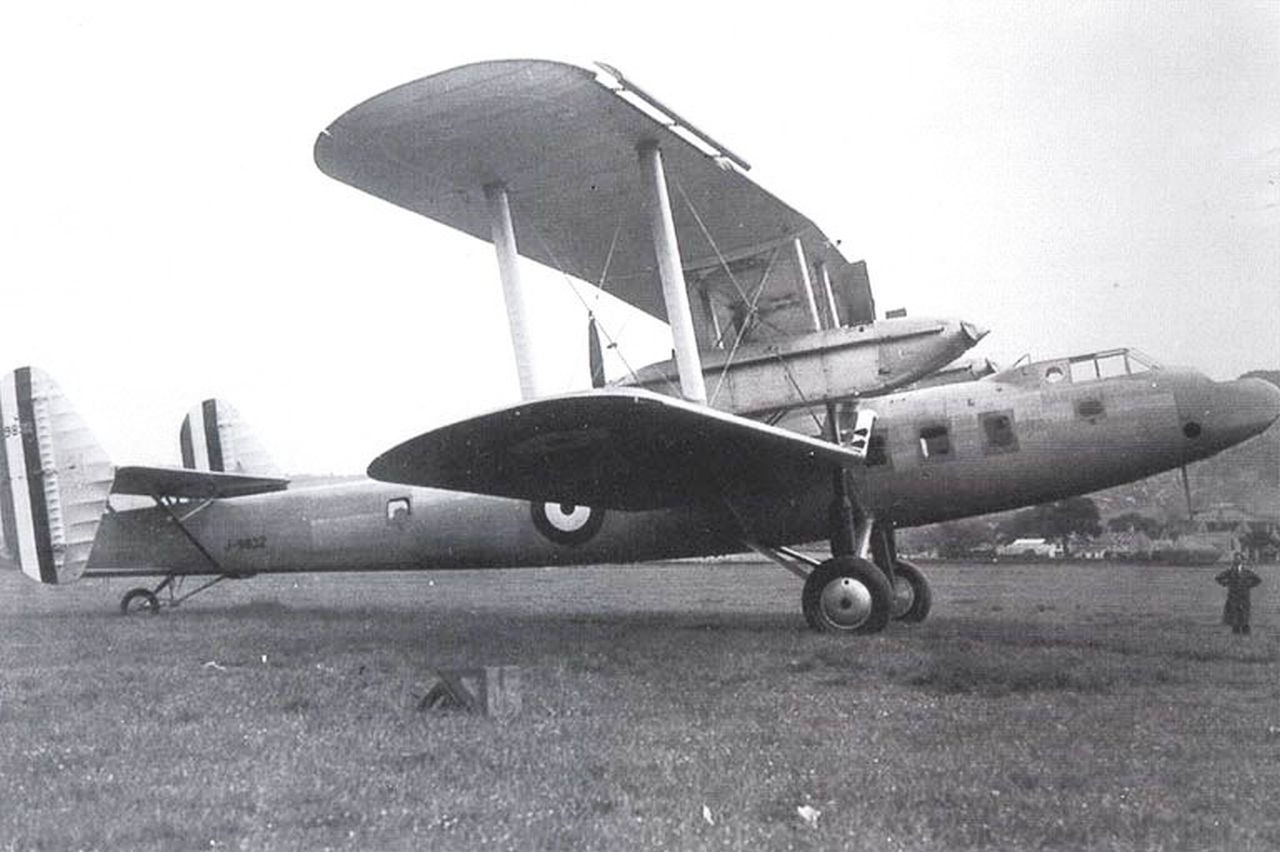

General information
- Type: military transport
- National origin: United Kingdom
- Manufacturer: Gloster Aircraft Company
- Designer: H.P.Folland
- Number built: 1

History
- First flight: 23 February 1932

The Gloster TC.33 was a large four-engined biplane designed for troop carrying and medical evacuation in the early 1930s. Only one was built.

== Design ==
The Gloster (previously Gloucestershire) Aircraft Co. began aircraft design and manufacture in 1917. Up to 1930, all but one of their machines had been single-engined, the exception being the A.S.31, which was not originally a Gloster design but based on the de Havilland DH.67B. Thus the appearance in 1930 of the four-engined troop carrier (TC) TC.33 was a complete break from their tradition and indeed was the only four-engined aircraft that Gloster ever built.

It was designed to meet Air Ministry specification C.16/28, which required the ability to carry 30 troops and their equipment for 1,200 miles (1,930 km) and was the same specification that produced the Handley Page H.P.43 and the Vickers Type 163. The TC.33 was a large single bay biplane with no stagger and 7° sweepback. Both wings had metal lattice spars and metal ribs with fabric covering. The lower wing was unusual in that its centre section had marked anhedral so that the main spars met at the top of the fuselage, leaving the interior unobstructed. A similar arrangement, though with less anhedral was used by the slightly earlier Handley Page H.P.42 airliner. The outer end of this centre section was strut braced to the lower fuselage. The TC.33 was also unusual in having a lower wing of (slightly) greater span than the upper; most unequal span wings had a larger upper wing. The four evaporatively cooled Rolls-Royce Kestrel engines were mounted in two nacelles, each containing a tractor-pusher pair together with their steam condenser and mounted between the wings at the end of the centre section. They were each carried by two vertical struts above the nacelle, complicated strutting below and by further strutting to the lower wing roots. The wide (22 ft 6 in (6.8 m)) split axle undercarriage had vertical legs from the front wing spar at the same point and bracing from the axles to the fuselage.

The fuselage was quite elegant, slender, oval in cross section and smoothly metal skinned. The cockpit was enclosed, but there were open gunners' positions at nose and tail. Like the cockpit, the long main cabin was heated and soundproofed. There was a large hatch in the floor for heavy loads with an integral hoist mounted above it, plus a smaller roof hatch through which loads could be lowered by crane. The biplane tail unit had conventional fabric covered endplate fins and rudders, but the tailplanes had an unusual configuration with the upper tailplane and elevator strut mounted above the fuselage and the much narrower chord lower part fixed to the lower fuselage.

== Development ==
The TC.33 first flew on 23 February 1932. Development flying showed it had good performance but suffered from elevator and rudder flutter. The former was cured with mass balancing but the rudder flutter persisted, particularly in high speed dives until the rudders were redesigned. It was exhibited at the 1932 RAF Hendon Display and then went on to RAF Martlesham Heath for trials. Once in the air, the TC.33 was judged a pleasant machine to fly, but it was crucially let down by its full load take off performance. Even at Martlesham it was hard to get it off the ground in a reasonable distance. The undercarriage behaviour was also criticised. Because of these concerns over take off performance at English temperatures and altitudes, the Air Ministry did not place an order, judging it would not cope with the hot and high conditions found at many RAF fields across the Empire. Thus J9832 was the only one of its kind. Indeed, none of the C.16/28 contenders were awarded a production contract.

== Specifications ==
Data from James 1971, p. 200

General characteristics

- Crew: 4
- Capacity: 30 troops
- Length: 80 ft 0 in (24.3 m)
- Wingspan: 95 ft 1 in (28.9 m)
- Height: 25 ft 8 in (7.8 m)
- Wing area: 2,493 sq ft (231 m^{2})
- Empty weight: 18,399 lb (8,346 kg)
- Gross weight: 28,884 lb (13,101 kg)
- Powerplant: 2 × Rolls-Royce Kestrel IIIS supercharged V-12-cylinder inline liquid cooled, 12 ft 6 in (3.8 m) diameter two bladed fixed pitch tractor propellers , 580 hp (432 kW) each
- Powerplant: 2 × Rolls-Royce Kestrel IIS supercharged V-12-cylinder inline liquid cooled, 11 ft 0 in (3.3 m) diameter two blade fixed pitch pusher propellers , 580 hp (432 kW) each

Performance

- Maximum speed: 142 mph (227 km/h, 123 kn) at 13,000 ft (4,000 m)
- Service ceiling: 19,100 ft (5,820 m)
- Rate of climb: 408 ft/min (2.1 m/s) to 10,000 ft (3,000 m)

Armament

- 1 × 0.303 in (7.7 mm) Lewis gun in front and rear positions
- 3,600 lb (1,600 kg) bomb load on racks below fuselage
