= Rolls-Royce Kestrel =

Aircraft engine from Rolls-Royce

Kestrel
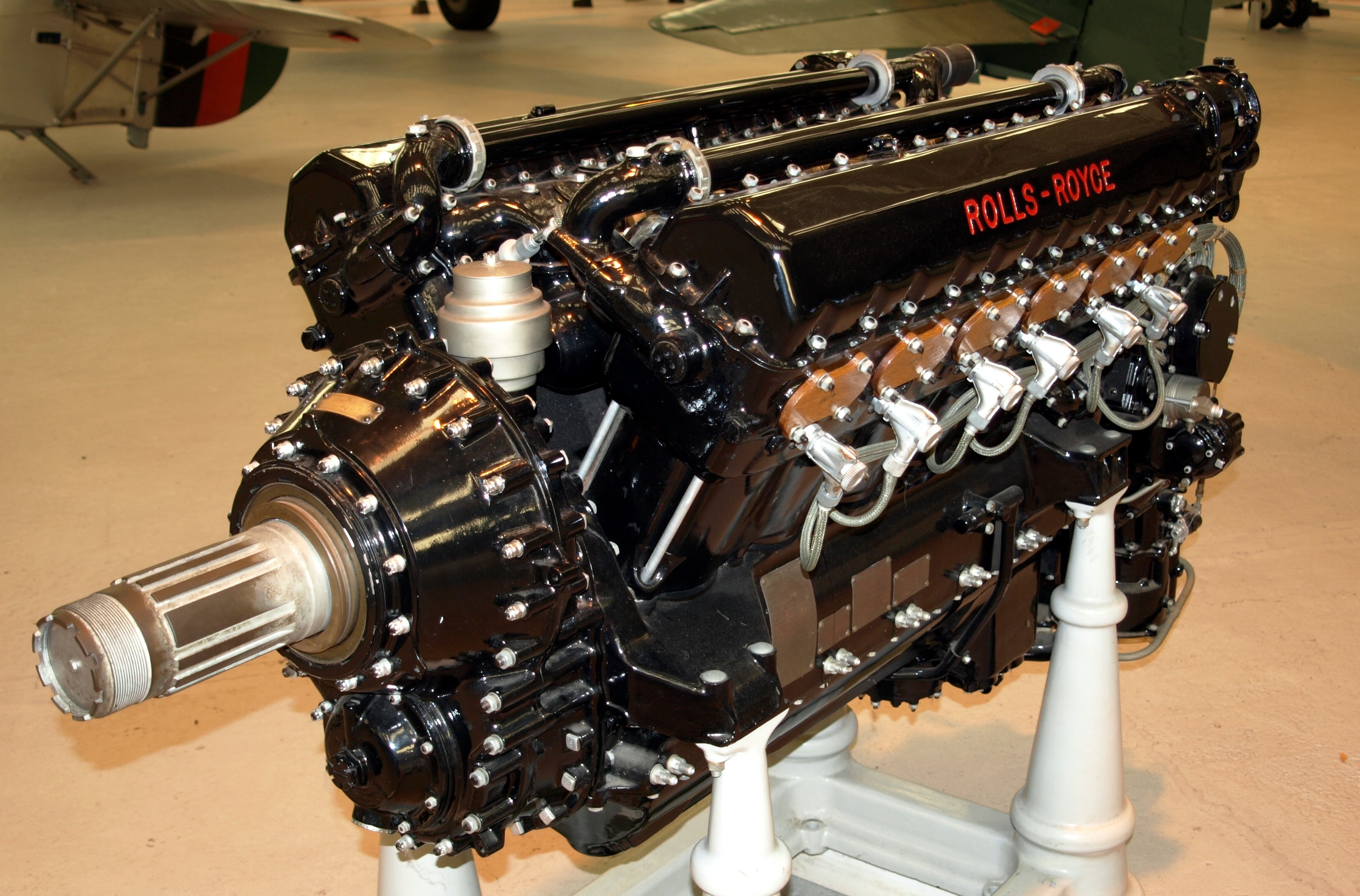
- Rolls-Royce Kestrel XVI at the Royal Air Force Museum Cosford
- Type: Piston V12 aero engine
- Manufacturer: Rolls-Royce Limited
- First run: Late 1926
- Major applications: Hawker Hart; Hawker Fury; Miles Master
- Number built: 4,750
- Developed into: Rolls-Royce Goshawk; Rolls-Royce Peregrine; Rolls-Royce Buzzard

The Rolls-Royce Kestrel (internal type F) is a 21.25 litre (1,295 in³) V12 aircraft engine from Rolls-Royce. It was their first cast-block engine, used as the pattern for most of their future piston-engine designs. Used during the interwar period, it was fitted to a number of British fighters and bombers of the era, including the Hawker Fury and Hawker Hart family, and the Handley Page Heyford. The Kestrel engine was also sold to international air force customers; in this role it was used to power prototypes of the German Messerschmitt Bf 109 and the Junkers Ju 87 "Stuka" dive-bomber, as the Junkers Jumo 210 engines were not ready. Several examples of the Kestrel engine remain airworthy today.

== Design and development ==
=== Origin ===
Earlier in-line engine designs were generally built on top of a cast aluminium crankcase, with individually-machined steel cylinders, bolted on top. Given the forces involved, the connection of the cylinders to the crankcase had to be robust, adding weight, and as a whole the engine was reliant on the structure of the crankcase to hold it together.

In 1923, the Curtiss CR won the 1923 Schneider Trophy. The CR was powered by the recently introduced Curtiss D-12 engine, which replaced the individual cylinders with a cast aluminium block. This gave the engine much greater strength, allowing the rest of the engine to be greatly simplified, making it much lighter overall, as well as easier to assemble as the two parts simply bolted together in a single operation. It was also easy to convert existing assembly lines to the new system as the cast blocks were already being produced for the crankcase, and all that was required was new machines to mill the blocks to the accuracy needed for the pistons.

The Curtiss D-12 was one of the most powerful engines of its era, and continued to exchange records with other contemporary high-power engines such as the Napier Lion. At the time, none of the British aero engine manufacturers could offer an engine which offered a similar power which was also as light and compact as the D-12. The D-12 was licensed by Fairey and introduced to as the Felix.

Arthur Rowledge, Chief Designer at Napier and the designer of the Napier Lion engine, joined Rolls-Royce in 1921 to take up the role as "Chief Assistant to Mr F. H. Royce". Rowledge built a team to introduce a new engine using the cast block, but set the goal to surpass the D-12. This would be accomplished using supercharging at all altitudes, allowing it to outperform naturally aspirated engines. Previously, supercharging (and turbocharging) was primarily used for high-altitude designs to offset the loss of ambient air pressure as the aircraft climbed, and thereby maintain power. But with the new construction technique, the engine would be so strong that it could be supercharged at all altitudes without overstressing the cylinders, allowing a smaller engine to operate as if it was larger, and thus improving its power-to-weight ratio.

The prototype Kestrel engine was first run in 1926, and one first flew in 1927, with a power rating of 450hp (335kW). The engine was normally aspirated in its initial form.

=== Improvements ===
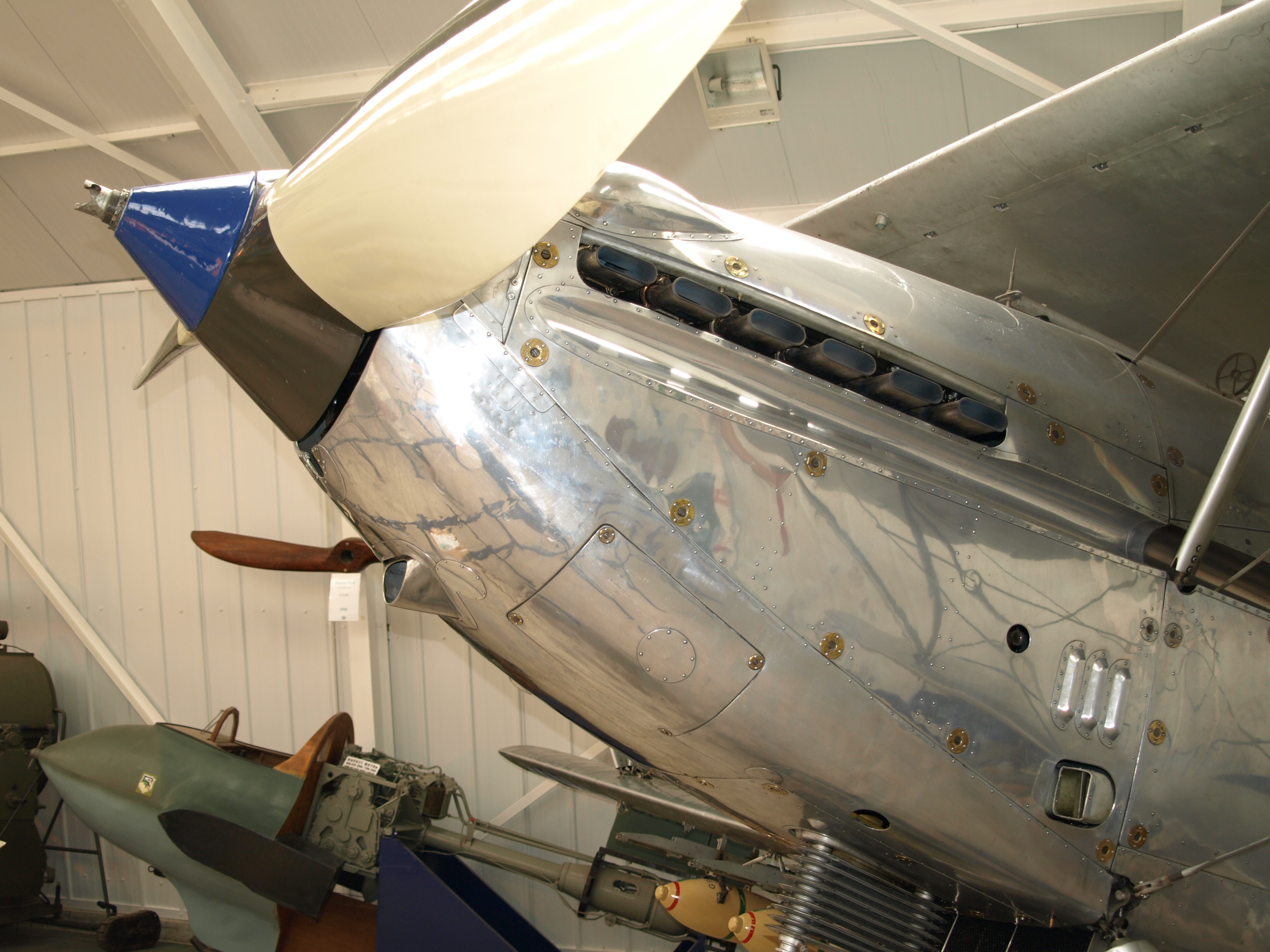
Streamlined Kestrel installation of the Hawker Hind. The driving dog for a Hucks starter can be seen

The engine was first produced in 1927 at 450 hp (340 kW), which was soon improved in the I-B version to 525 hp (391 kW) by increasing the compression ratio to 7:1. The I-B variant saw widespread use in the Hawker Hart family of aircraft, a mainstay of British air power during the early 1930s.

Development continued and the V model introduced the centrifugal supercharger, increasing power to 695 hp (518 kW).

Increased availability of higher octane aviation fuels in the late 1930s allowed the engine to be boosted to higher power levels without suffering from detonation. The mark-XVI engine used in the Miles Master M.9 prototype delivered 745 hp (556 kW), and the XXX variant of 1940 saw service at 720 hp (540 kW).

=== Cooling system ===
One key advance in the Kestrel was the use of a pressurised cooling system. Water boils at 100°C at standard atmospheric pressure, but this pressure decreases as altitude increases, and therefore the boiling point of water decreases with altitude. The amount of heat rejected by an air-to-air cooling system is a function of the maximum coolant temperature and volume, so the resulting decrease in cooling capacity became a limiting factor for engine power in this period, as the coolant has to be kept below boiling point.

The solution was to pressurise the engine's entire cooling system, thereby raising the temperature at which the coolant would boil: not only does this help mitigate the decrease in cooling performance with altitude, but allows a smaller cooling system to be used in the aircraft for the same heat load. The Kestrel was built to maintain coolant pressure to keep the boiling point at about 150°C.

== Variants ==
In early Kestrel variants, unsupercharged engines were available in two compression ratios, 'A' engines had a compression ratio of 6:1, and 'B' engines a high compression ratio of 7:1. The Kestrel was designed to be fitted with a gear-driven supercharger, in early Kestrel variants 'MS' engines were moderately supercharged and 'S' engines were fully supercharged. A number of Kestrel variants were produced by rebuilding or modifying earlier Marks.

- Kestrel I, F.X (1927–28) – 460 hp (340 kW) maximum continuous power, direct-drive left-hand tractor drive, compression ratio 6:1.
- Kestrel IA, F.XIA (1927–28) – 490 hp (370 kW) maximum continuous power, geared right-hand tractor drive, compression ratio 6:1. Production of new-built engines totalled 18.
- Kestrel IB, F.XIB (1929–34) – 616 bhp (459 kW) maximum power at 2,700 rpm for 5 minutes using 77 octane fuel, 480 hp (360 kW) maximum continuous power. Compression ratio 7:1. Production of new-built engines totalled 580.
- Kestrel IB3, F.XIB3 (1934) – 480 hp (360 kW) maximum continuous power, compression ratio 7:1. Production of new-built engines totalled 92.
- Kestrel IB4, F.XIB4 (1934) – 480 hp (360 kW) maximum continuous power, compression ratio 7:1. Production of new-built engines totalled 5.
- Kestrel IB5, F.XIB5 (1934) – 480 hp (360 kW) maximum continuous power, compression ratio 7:1. Production of new-built engines totalled 34.
- Kestrel IMS, F.XIMS (1929) – 525 / 535 hp (391 / 399 kW) maximum continuous power, medium supercharged, compression ratio 6:1. Production of new-built engines totalled 1.
- Kestrel IS, F.XIS (1928–33) – 480 hp (360 kW) maximum continuous power, fully supercharged, compression ratio 6:1. Production of new-built engines totalled 9.
- Kestrel IIA, F.XIIA (1927–29) – 490 hp (370 kW) maximum continuous power, compression ratio 6:1. Production of new-built engines totalled 31.
- Kestrel IIB, F.XIIB (1933) – 490 hp (370 kW) maximum continuous power, compression ratio 7:1. Production of new-built engines totalled 20.
- Kestrel IIMS, F.XIIMS (1928–35) – 660 bhp (490 kW) maximum power at 2,700 rpm for 5 minutes using 77 octane fuel, 525 / 535 hp (391 / 399 kW) maximum continuous power. Tractor drive, medium superchanged, compression ratio 5.5:1. Production of new-built engines totalled 82, some were later converted to pusher drive for the Short Singapore.
- Kestrel IIMS.2, F.XIIMS.2 (1933–34) – 525 / 535 hp (391 / 399 kW) maximum continuous power, medium superchanged, compression ratio 6:1. Production of new-built engines totalled 64.
- Kestrel IIMS.5, F.XIIMS.5 (1934) – 656 bhp (489 kW) maximum power at 2,700 rpm using 77 octane fuel, 525 / 535 hp (391 / 399 kW) maximum continuous power, medium superchanged, compression ratio 6:1. Production of new-built engines totalled 5.
- Kestrel IIMS.6, F.XIIMS.6 (1935) – 525 / 535 hp (391 / 399 kW) maximum continuous power, medium superchanged, compression ratio 6:1. Production of new-built engines totalled 16.
- Kestrel IIS, F.XIIS (1928–38) – 550 bhp (410 kW) maximum power with 1.75 psi (12.1 kPa) boost at 2,750 rpm for 5 minutes using 77 octane fuel, 480 hp (360 kW) maximum continuous power. Fully supercharged, compression ratio 6:1. Normally tractor drive, although versions fitted to the Gloster TC.33 were pusher drive.
- Kestrel IIIB, F.XIVB – 480 hp (360 kW) maximum continuous power, compression ratio 7:1.
- Kestrel IIIMS, F.XIVMS (1933–35) – 515 / 535 hp (384 / 399 kW) maximum continuous power, medium superchanged, compression ratio 5.5:1. Normally tractor drive, although versions fitted to the Short Singapore III were pusher drive.
- Kestrel IIIMS.2, F.XIVMS.2 (1933–34) – 515 / 535 hp (384 / 399 kW) maximum continuous power, medium superchanged, compression ratio 6:1. Production of new-built engines totalled 20.
- Kestrel IIIMS.4, F.XIVMS.4 (1934) – 515 / 535 hp (384 / 399 kW) maximum continuous power, medium superchanged, compression ratio 6:1. Production of new-built engines totalled 16.
- Kestrel IIIMS.6, F.XIVMS.6 (1935) – 650 bhp (480 kW) maximum power with 1.5 psi (10 kPa) boost at 2,700 rpm for take off or 1 minute using 77 octane fuel, 515 / 535 hp (384 / 399 kW) maximum continuous power. Medium superchanged, compression ratio 6:1. Production of new-built engines totalled 16.
- Kestrel IIIS, F.XIVS (1930–38) – 580 bhp (430 kW) maximum power with 1.75 psi (12.1 kPa) boost at 2,700 rpm for take off or 1 minute using 77 octane fuel, 480 hp (360 kW) maximum continuous power. Fully superchanged, compression ratio 6:1. Production of new-built engines totalled 71.
- Kestrel IIIS.3, F.XIVS.3 (1934) – 480 hp (360 kW) maximum continuous power, fully superchanged, compression ratio 6:1. Production of new-built engines totalled 48.
- Kestrel IV (1935) – 645 / 695 hp (481 / 518 kW) maximum continuous power, fully superchanged, compression ratio 6:1. Single engine built, it became the prototype Rolls-Royce Goshawk.
- Kestrel V, V Spl. (1933–38) – 742 bhp (553 kW) maximum power with 3.5 psi (24 kPa) boost at 2,900 rpm using 87 octane fuel, 645 / 695 hp (481 / 518 kW) maximum continuous power. Fully superchanged, compression ratio 6:1. Production of new-built engines totalled 1,178.
- Kestrel VDR (1937) – 556 bhp (415 kW) maximum power with 2.25 psi (15.5 kPa) boost at 2,350 rpm using 77 octane fuel, 492 hp (367 kW) maximum continuous power. Fully superchanged, compression ratio 6:1.
- Kestrel VI (1934–1936) – 740 bhp (550 kW) maximum power with 6 psi (41 kPa) boost at 2,700 rpm for take off or 1 minute using 87 octane fuel, 665 / 695 hp (496 / 518 kW) maximum continuous power. Fully superchanged, compression ratio 6:1. Production of new-built engines totalled 258.
- Kestrel VII – 675 / 700 hp (503 / 522 kW) maximum continuous power, medium superchanged, compression ratio 6:1.
- Kestrel VIII (1936–37) – 675 / 700 hp (503 / 522 kW) maximum continuous power, medium superchanged pusher drive, compression ratio 6:1. Production of new-built engines totalled 133.
- Kestrel IX (1934–37) – 675 / 700 hp (503 / 522 kW) maximum continuous power, medium superchanged tractor drive, compression ratio 6:1. Production of new-built engines totalled 136.
- Kestrel X (1934–37) – 636 bhp (474 kW) maximum power at 2,900 rpm for 5 minutes using 87 octane fuel, 520 / 545 hp (388 / 406 kW) maximum continuous power. Compression ratio 7:1. Production of new-built engines totalled 1,161.
- Kestrel XDR (1937) – 500 / 525 hp (373 / 391 kW) maximum continuous power, compression ratio 7:1.
- Kestrel XI (1935–36) – 520 / 545 hp (388 / 406 kW) maximum continuous power, compression ratio 7:1. Production of new-built engines totalled 55.
- Kestrel XII – 520 / 545 hp (388 / 406 kW) maximum continuous power, compression ratio 7:1.
- Kestrel XIV – 640 / 670 hp (480 / 500 kW) maximum continuous power, fully supercharged, compression ratio 6:1.
- Kestrel XV – 640 / 670 hp (480 / 500 kW) maximum continuous power, fully supercharged, compression ratio 6:1.
- Kestrel XVI, XVI Spl. (1936–38) – 640 / 670 hp (480 / 500 kW) maximum continuous power, fully supercharged, compression ratio 6:1. Production of new-built engines totalled 95.
- Kestrel XVI (DR) (1937) – 640 / 670 hp (480 / 500 kW) maximum continuous power, fully supercharged, compression ratio 6:1.
- Kestrel XVI (VP) (1937) – 773 bhp (576 kW) maximum power with 3.25 psi (22.4 kPa) boost at 3,000 rpm for 5 minutes using 87 octane fuel, 640 / 670 hp (480 / 500 kW) maximum continuous power. Fully supercharged, compression ratio 6:1. Converted from a Mk V for the Miles Kestrel.
- Kestrel XXX (1938) – 720 bhp (540 kW) maximum power with 5 psi (34 kPa) boost at 2,750 rpm for take off or one minute using 87 octane fuel. Fully supercharged, compression ratio 6.2:1. Final Kestrel variant used in the Miles Master, they were manufactured by rebuilding older Kestrels, usually Mk Vs and Mk XVIs, with updated components.

== Further development ==
During 1927, once the prototype of the Kestrel was complete, a need for a larger and more powerful engine was conceived for use in flying boats, and development began on an engine which utilised a 6" cylinder bore, compared to the Kestrel's 5", this became the Rolls-Royce Buzzard. The Buzzard (or "H") engine was further modified for use in the Schneider Trophy as the Rolls-Royce R engine. In 1935 the Kestrel design was used as the basis to develop the Rolls-Royce Merlin.

The Kestrel design was used as a base for both the Goshawk, however the aircraft which were intended to be fitted with the Goshawk engine were cancelled, so the project was scrapped.

The Kestrel was also used as the basis for the Peregrine (and therefore the Vulture), all utilising the same 5" piston bore and 5.5" piston stroke. In practice, development of the Peregrine and Vulture engines were curtailed, before eventually being cancelled, to allow increased resource developing the Merlin engine during the war.

As a response to the fuel injection systems developed by Bosch, in 1936 a Kestrel engine was fitted with a pressurised carburettor system to improve fuelling at high altitudes. The resulting behaviour of the engine when flight tested by the Farnborough institute was seen to be "...one of the smoothest engines they had used at high altitudes".

== Applications ==
From Lumsden, the Kestrel may not be the main power-plant for these types.

Aircraft applications

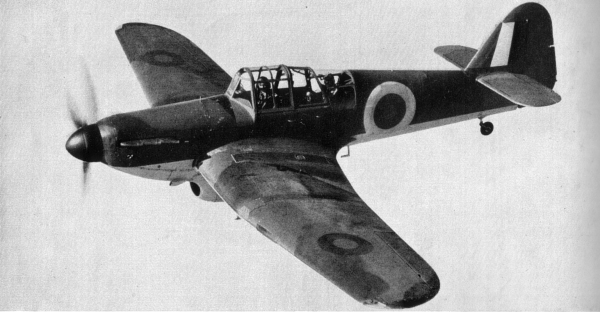
The Kestrel powered Miles Master

- Airco DH.9
- Aviotehas PN-3
- Avro Antelope
- Blackburn Nautilus
- Blackburn Sydney
- Dornier Do J
- Fairey Firefly II
- Fairey Fleetwing
- Fairey Fox
- Fairey Hendon
- Fairey S.9/30
- Fokker C.V
- Fokker C.X (prototype)
- Fokker D.XVII
- Gloster Gnatsnapper
- Gloster TC.33
- Gloster TSR.38
- Handley Page Hamilton
- Handley Page Heyford
- Handley Page H.P.30
- Handley Page H.P.38
- Hawker Audax
- Hawker Demon
- Hawker Fury
- Hawker Hardy
- Hawker Hart
- Hawker Hind
- Hawker Hornet
- Hawker Nimrod
- Hawker Osprey
- Heinkel He 70 G-1
- Heinkel He 112 (prototype)
- Henschel Hs 122 (prototype)
- Junkers Ju 86 (intended)
- Junkers Ju 87 (prototype)
- Messerschmitt Bf 109 (prototype)
- Miles Master
- Miles Kestrel
- Parnall Pipit
- Praga E-45
- Renard R.31
- Saro A.10
- Short Gurnard
- Short Singapore
- Supermarine Scapa
- Supermarine Southampton
- Vickers F.21/26
- Vickers Type 150
- Vickers Type 163
- Westland Wizard

Other applications

- Speed of the Wind

== Surviving airworthy engines ==
A handful of Rolls-Royce Kestrel engines remain airworthy as of March 2024, powering original or restored Hawker biplane types:

- Hawker Hind (G-AENP) is owned and operated by The Shuttleworth Collection in the UK. This suffered an issue in 2015 but has been rebuilt and installed back in to the Hind as of March 2024.
- Hawker Demon (G-BTVE) with a Kestrel engine, which was resident at The Shuttleworth Collection in the UK, has been sold to an American collector as of March 2024.
- Hawker Nimrod I (G-BWWK), S1581, resides at IWM Duxford in the UK with The Fighter Collection. This aircraft is fitted with a Rolls-Royce Kestrel V.
- Hawker Nimrod II (G-BURZ), K3661, resides at IWM Duxford with the Historic Aircraft Collection and is fitted with a Rolls-Royce Kestrel VI.
- Hawker Fury I (G-CBZP) with a Kestrel II engine resides at IWM Duxford with the Historic Aircraft Collection.

== Engines on display ==
Preserved examples of the Rolls-Royce Kestrel engine are on public display at the:

- Australian National Aviation Museum
- Brooklands Museum
- The Hangar Flight Museum
- Imperial War Museum Duxford
- Polish Aviation Museum Cracow
- Rolls-Royce Heritage Trust
- Royal Air Force Museum Cosford
- Royal Air Force Museum London
- Science Museum (London)
- World of Wearable Arts and Classic Cars Museum (Nelson, NZ)
- South Australian Aviation Museum Adelaide (Operational exhibit)

== Specifications (Kestrel V) ==
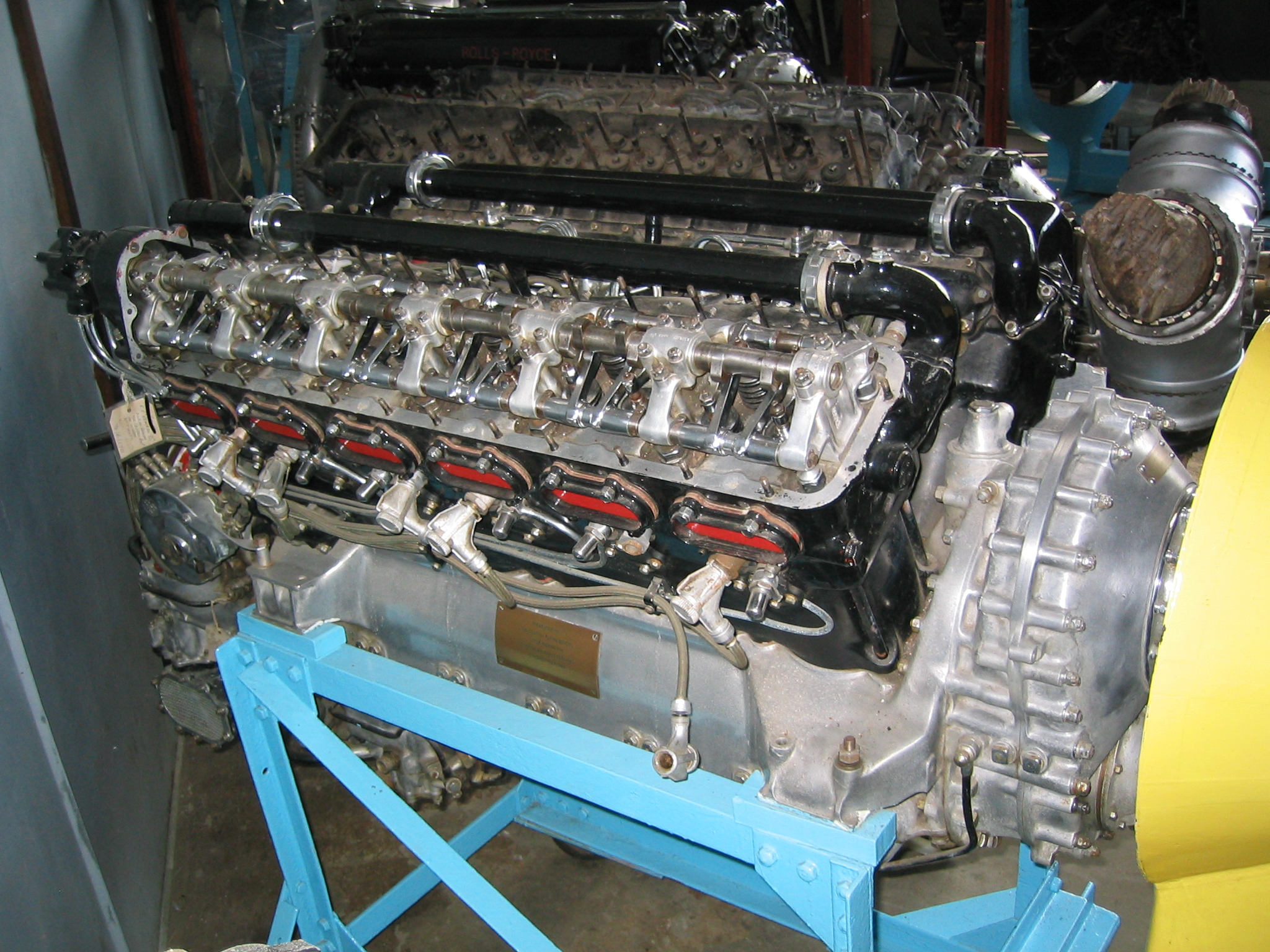
RR Kestrel VI with valve gear exposed

Data from Lumsden

=== General characteristics ===
- Type: Supercharged liquid-cooled 60-degree V12 engine
- Bore: 5 in (127 mm)
- Stroke: 5.5 in (139.7 mm)
- Displacement: 1,295.88 in³ (21.25 L)
- Length: 74.61 in (1,895 mm)
- Width: 24.41 in (620 mm)
- Height: 35.63 in (905 mm)
- Dry weight: 957 lb (434 kg)

=== Components ===
- Valvetrain: Single overhead camshaft driving two inlet and two exhaust poppet valves per cylinder
- Supercharger: Gear-driven, single-stage centrifugal type supercharger
- Fuel system: Rolls-Royce pressurised duplex carburettors
- Fuel type: 87 octane petrol
- Cooling system: Liquid-cooled, pressurised to 300°F (150°C)
- Reduction gear: Spur, 0.553:1

=== Performance ===
- Power output:
- 685 hp (511 kW) at 2,240 rpm for takeoff
- 631 hp (471 kW) at 2,900 rpm at 14,400 ft (4,400 m)
- Specific power: 0.53 hp/in³ (24.05 kW/L)
- Compression ratio: 6.0:1
- Oil consumption: 0.18-0.35 oz/(hp/hr) (7-13 g/(kW/hr))
- Power-to-weight ratio: 0.72 hp/lb (1.18 kW/kg)

== See also ==
Related development

- Rolls-Royce Goshawk
- Rolls-Royce Peregrine

Comparable engines

- Curtiss D-12
- Fairey Prince (V-12)
- Packard 1A-1500

Related lists

- List of aircraft engines
