= Fairey S.9/30 =

Two-seat, single-engined biplane

S.9/30

General information
- Type: fleet spotter/reconnaissance
- National origin: United Kingdom
- Manufacturer: Fairey Aviation Company
- Number built: 1

History
- First flight: 22 February 1934
- Developed into: Fairey Swordfish

The Fairey S.9/30 was a two-seat, single-engined biplane built to meet an Air Ministry specification for a fleet reconnaissance aircraft. It flew during 1934–36 in both land- and seaplane configurations. Although only one was built, it was the progenitor of the Fairey Swordfish.

== Development ==
The design evolution that led to the Fairey Swordfish began with Fairey's submission to Air Ministry specification S.9/30 for a two-seat fleet spotter-reconnaissance aircraft. The company were awarded funds for a prototype in August 1931. The resulting aircraft, which did not fly until 22 February 1934 was known only by its specification number.

The Fairey S.9/30 was constructed throughout with stainless steel strip and tube, fabric covered. It was a single bay biplane with wings of slight stagger and sweep. The lower wing was a little smaller both in span and chord; because of these differences the interplane struts converged noticeably towards the lower wing and the outer pairs leaned slightly outwards. Ailerons were only fitted to the upper wing, which also had leading edge slots. The wings could fold for on-ship storage.

The most obvious difference between the S.9/30 and its descendants was the powerplant, the former having a liquid cooled V-12 Rolls-Royce Kestrel, rather than the radial engine of the Swordfish. This engine was steam cooled, with condensers on the underside of the upper wing centre section. The upper wing was above the top of the fuselage and the pilot's open cockpit was just behind the trailing edge of the narrow chord centre section, his view enhanced by the resulting cut-outs in both wings. Immediately behind him there was a long cockpit for the gunner. The empennage was conventional, with a braced tailplane and balanced control surfaces.

The S.9/30 was flown from land and later as a seaplane. Its wheeled undercarriage was divided, the main legs meeting the forward spar under the centre section interplane struts and with forward bracing to the fuselage at the rear of the engine bay. The main wheels had low pressure tyres and were fitted with wheel brakes; there was a small tailwheel. As a seaplane, it had a single central float, braced by two forward struts to the rear of the engine and a pair of aft struts joining the float to the rear wing spar. This float, almost as long as the aircraft and projecting well forward of the nose, had a single step and a water rudder. A pair of stabilising floats were mounted outboard, braced to the wings spars under the outer interplane struts.

Tests in the landplane configuration continued through 1934, when the floats were fitted. It first flew as a seaplane on 15 January 1935 at Fairey's Hamble base. It went for Naval tests at Felixstowe in 1936, where its clean behaviour on the water was praised. In the air, the controls were found to be "heavy but positive".

== Towards the Swordfish ==
At the same time as they were rather slowly building the S.9/30, Fairey were also working on a very similar aircraft that would combine the spotter reconnaissance role with that of a torpedo bomber. Originally intended for the Greek Air Force, it only differed in having a 625 hp (466 kW) radial Armstrong Siddeley Panther VI engine. This aircraft became known as the TSR I and flew for the first time on 21 March 1933, well before the S.9/30. Apart from the engine, the TSR I differed from the S.9/30 only in having strut-interlinked ailerons on both wings and, initially, a spatted undercarriage. In June the engine was changed to a 635 hp (474 kW) Bristol Pegasus IIM, another radial enclosed, like the previous powerplant, in a narrow chord Townend ring. At about the same time it lost its spats and arrestor hook. The sole aircraft was lost after a flat spin on 11 September 1933.

Despite its loss, the performance was good enough to call for the production of another aircraft to the specification S.15/33, an amalgamation of the earlier specifications S.9/30 and M.1/30 for a torpedo bomber. The resulting machine was the TSR II; compared to the TSR I it was lengthened and the altered centre of gravity accommodated by increased wing sweep. It had a broader chord rudder and a wide-chord cowled Pegasus engine. This was the Swordfish prototype.

== Specifications (seaplane) ==
Data from Taylor 1974, pp. 236

General characteristics

- Crew: 2
- Length: 39 ft 3 in (11.99 m)
- Wingspan: 46 ft 0 in (14.02 m)
- Height: 16 ft 6 in (5.03 m)
- Wing area: 442 sq ft (41.06 m^{2})
- Empty weight: 4,548 lb (2,063 kg)
- Gross weight: 6,500 lb (2,948 kg)
- Powerplant: 1 × Rolls-Royce Kestrel IIMS V-12 liquid cooled supercharged , 525 hp (392 kW)

Performance

- Maximum speed: 136 mph (219 km/h, 118 kn) at 2,000 ft (610 m)
- Rate of climb: 880 ft/min (4.47 m/s) maximum at 2,000 ft (610 m)

Armament

- 1 × 0.303 in (7.7 mm) Vickers machine gun in port side engine coming
- 1 × 0.303 in (7.7 mm) Lewis gun in rear cockpit on Fairey high speed mounting

== See also ==
Related development

- Fairey Swordfish

Related lists

- List of flying boats and floatplanes
