= Blackburn Nautilus =

British single-engine two-seat biplane spotter/fighter

Nautilus
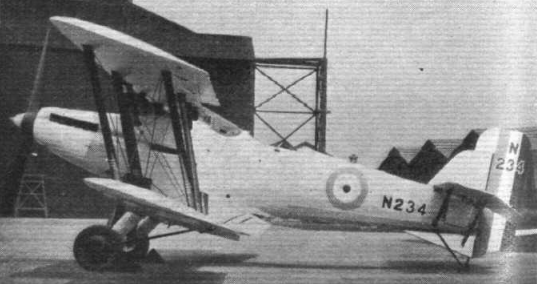

General information
- Type: spotter/interceptor
- National origin: United Kingdom
- Manufacturer: Blackburn Aeroplane and Motor Co. Ltd
- Designer: F.A Bumpas
- Number built: 1

History
- First flight: May 1929

The Blackburn 2F.1 Nautilus was a British single-engine two-seat biplane spotter/fighter built in 1929. Only one was completed.

== Development ==
The company designation, 2F.1, meant that the Nautilus was Blackburn's first two-seat fighter, though it was really intended as a carrier-based fleet spotter with interception capability. It was designed to Air Ministry Specification O.22/26. Though issued in June 1926, this specification did not reach a decision on the final engine to be used until October 1927; prototype contracts were only placed in January 1928, and the four chosen manufacturers did not produce prototypes for trial until 1929. These were the eventual winners, the navalised Hawker Hart first prototype later produced as the Hawker Osprey plus the Fairey Fleetwing, the Short Gurnard and the Blackburn Nautilus. All these were powered by the V-12 water-cooled Rolls-Royce F.XIIMS - later known as the Kestrel IIMS - which produced 525 hp (391 kW) and had a small cross-sectional area.

The slim power unit encouraged the design of slender, well-streamlined fuselages, and the nose of the Nautilus was longer and more pointed than even that of the Ripon III, which used a larger area W-12 Napier Lion engine. The wooden propeller was two-bladed with a diameter of 11 ft (3.35 m). Like most of Blackburn's aircraft of the time, the fuselage was built up around four steel longerons; it was duralumin-covered from the nose to just aft of the rear observer/gunner's cockpit, the rest fabric-covered. The pilot's cockpit was immediately in front of the observer's, under an upper trailing edge cutout. A braced, rather rectangular tailplane was carried at the top of the fuselage. There was fixed fin surface both above and below the fuselage and the rudder with its horn balance had an upper fin and extended down to the lower part. Both the tailplane incidence and (more unusually) the alignment of the upper part of the fin could be adjusted in flight via trimming wheels. The robust undercarriage was a broad, split-axle type with mainwheels fitted with disc brakes. As a seaplane, it could be fitted either with a two-float arrangement or with a single central float, the latter intended to give a better field of view to the observer.

The slim fuselage of the Nautilus did not have its keel aligned with the lower wing, as on most biplanes; rather, the centreline was at mid-gap. Blackburn used the gap between keel and wing to insert a faired radiator with a shutter-controlled front intake. This rather enhanced the Nautilus' pointed appearance. The wings were of two-bay construction with parallel struts, staggered and swept. Only the lower wing had dihedral. There were ailerons on both upper and lower wings. The wings were foldable for carrier storage.

== Operational history ==
The Nautilus was first flown at Brough Aerodrome in May 1929, by T. Neville Stack and testing lead to some changes to the radiator and elevators. It went on to flight trials at RAF Martlesham Heath that August. With the Gurnard eliminated, the other competitors with the Nautilus went to sea on HMS Furious in January 1930. Unsuccessful in the trials, the Nautilus was remodelled as a ship-to-shore communicator after removal of the Scarff ring from the rear seat. In 1931, it went back to Martlesham and was used for a couple of years as a cross-country communications aircraft.

== Specifications (landplane) ==
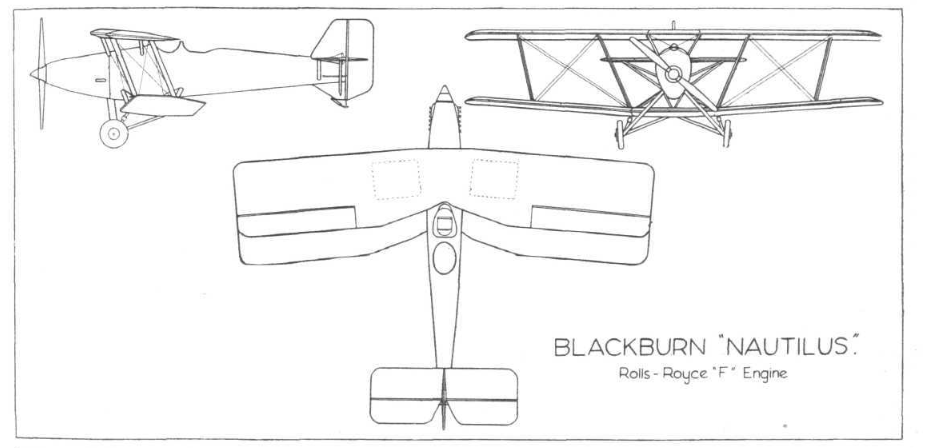

Data from Jackson 1968, pp. 243–4

General characteristics

- Crew: two
- Length: 31 ft 8 in (9.65 m)
- Wingspan: 37 ft 0 in (11.27 m)
- Height: 10 ft 10 in (3.30 m)
- Wing area: 458 sq ft (42.55 m^{2})
- Empty weight: 3,223 lb (1,462 kg)
- Gross weight: 4,750 lb (2,155 kg)
- Powerplant: 1 × V-12 water-cooled Rolls-Royce F.XIIMS , 525 hp (390 kW)

Performance

- Maximum speed: 154 mph (248 km/h, 134 kn) at 5,000 ft (1525 m)
- Range: 375 mi (600 km, 326 nmi)
- Service ceiling: 18,800 ft (5,730 m)
- Rate of climb: 1,260 ft/min (6.4 m/s)

Armament

- 1 × fixed 0.303 in (7.7 mm) Vickers machine gun firing forward through propeller from a trough in fuselage port side
- 1 × ring mounted 0.303 in (7.7 mm) Lewis Gun in rear cockpit
