= Fairey Fleetwing =

British two-seat, single-engine biplane

Fleetwing
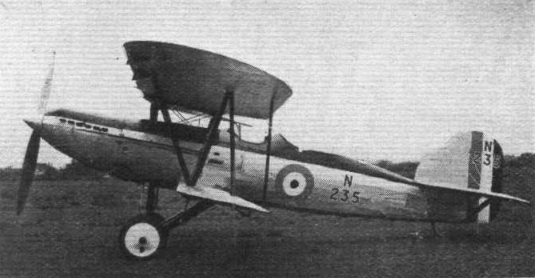

General information
- Type: Fleet reconnaissance
- National origin: United Kingdom
- Manufacturer: Fairey Aviation Company
- Designer: Marcel Lobelle
- Number built: 1

History
- First flight: 16 May 1929

The Fairey Fleetwing was a British two-seat, single-engine biplane designed to an Air Ministry contract for carrier-based reconnaissance operations in the late 1920s. Only one was built.

== Development ==
The Fairey Fleetwing was Fairey's response to Air Ministry Specification 22/26 for a two-seat carrier-borne spotter reconnaissance aircraft for the Fleet Air Arm, stressed for catapulting and with limited interceptor fighter capability. By 1927, Fairey had accumulated much experience with biplanes powered by water-cooled engines of small frontal area, allowing increasingly clean, streamlined installations. Fairey had set off down this path with the Fox I which first and controversially used a U.S. Curtiss D-12 engine, though later Foxes were powered by the British Rolls-Royce Kestrel. The Fox was followed by the similarly powered single seat Firefly II and the Fox II. The Fleetwing was designed in this tradition, using the all-metal construction techniques developed for the Fox IIM though flying at first with wooden wings.

The Fleetwing was a single-bay biplane which, like the Fox II, had a lower wing of much narrower chord than the upper plane. Initially, N-type interplane struts of quite wide chord were used, though later slimmed. Upper and lower ailerons were at first linked by wire but later with a rigid strut. The wings folded for carrier storage. The fuselage, apart from cockpit details and the undercarriage and empennage of the Fleetwing, Firefly and Fox II were very similar and the Fleetwing's fin and rudder evolved with the Firefly's from a slightly square topped, unbalanced arrangement to a more round topped rudder with horn balance. The Fleetwing's tailplane retained a single lower strut. There were two cockpits, one for the pilot under an upper wing cut out and a gunner's position behind. Armament was traditional: a single forward-firing synchronised .303 in (7.7 mm) Vickers machine gun and a .303 in (7.7 mm) Lewis Gun on a Fairey high-speed mounting in the rear cockpit. There was a bomb rack under the port wing.

The Fleetwing first flew on 16 May 1929 from Northolt, piloted by Norman Macmillan and powered by a Rolls-Royce F.XI (Kestrel I) V-12 water cooled engine, later replaced with a supercharged Kestrel IIMS. As on the prototype Firefly II and Fox II, these engines were cooled with retractable radiators.

== Operational history ==
After initial trials in June at Martlesham Heath and on HMS Furious with the wooden wings and early fin and rudder it came back to Fairey's for modifications, then returned to Martlesham for competitive testing against the Hawker Osprey, Blackburn Nautilus and Short Gurnard. The Osprey and the Fleetwing emerged as front runners and their seaplane versions were tested together in the early summer of 1930. The Osprey emerged as winner because of its better manoeuvrability and resistance to sea water-induced corrosion.

The sole Fleetwing remained in use until mid-1932, not least as a seaplane trainer and sea-state investigator for the successful 1931 Schneider Trophy team. In April 1932, the Fleetwing was on HMS Norfolk for catapult trials, 28 successful flights terminated by an emergency landing and damage beyond repair in retrieval.

== Specifications (landplane) ==
Data from Taylor 1974, p. 195

General characteristics

- Crew: 2
- Length: 29 ft 4 in (8.94 m)
- Wingspan: 37 ft 0 in (11.28 m)
- Height: 11 ft 5 in (3.48 m)
- Wing area: 363 sq ft (33.73 m^{2})
- Gross weight: 4,737 lb (2,149 kg)
- Powerplant: 1 × Rolls-Royce Kestrel IIMS V-12 watercooled supercharged , 600 hp (447 kW)

Performance

- Maximum speed: 169 mph (272 km/h, 147 kn)
- Cruise speed: 146 mph (235 km/h, 127 kn)
- Rate of climb: 1,190 ft/min (6.05 m/s) to 5,000 ft (1,525 m)

Armament

- 1 × 0.303 in (7.7 mm) Vickers machine gun firing forward from port side
- 1 × 0.303 in (7.7 mm) Lewis gun in rear cockpit on Fairey high speed mount
- 4 × 20 lb (9.1 kg) bombs in port side underwing rack
