= Gloster TSR.38 =

Single-engined three-seat biplane

TSR.38
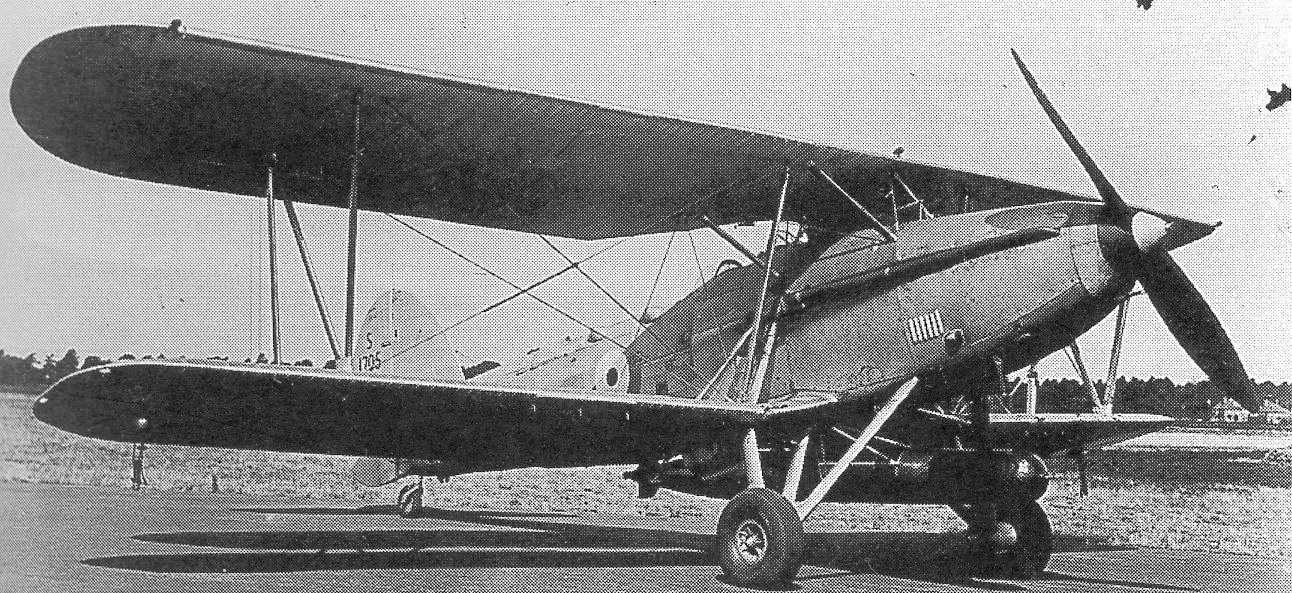

General information
- Type: 3-seat torpedo/spotter/reconnaissance
- National origin: United Kingdom
- Manufacturer: Gloucestershire Aircraft Company
- Number built: 1

History
- First flight: April 1932

The Gloster TSR.38 was a single-engined three-seat biplane designed as a naval torpedo/spotter/reconnaissance aircraft in the early 1930s. It did not reach production and only one was built.

== Development ==
Gloster built what was at first known as the FS.36 (FS standing for fleet spotter) to Air Ministry specification S.9/30 which called for a three-seat torpedo bomber/spotter/reconnaissance aircraft, starting work in late 1930 but proceeding slowly so it did not fly until early April 1932. This aircraft, powered by a 600 hp (450 kW) Rolls-Royce Kestrel IIMS engine was flown to RAF Martlesham Heath for initial testing. RAF pilots reported good handling at higher speeds but criticised its low speed handling and braking, important parameters for a carrier landing aircraft. It then returned to Gloster's for modification, partly to meet these criticisms and partly to cover a new specification S.15/33, a melding of the early specification with M.1/30. Re-engined with a Rolls-Royce Goshawk VIII of 690 hp (515 kW), and with modified wings of greater area the aircraft emerged in mid-1933 as the TSR.38, TSR standing for torpedo/spotter/reconnaissance.

The TSR.38 was a fabric covered all metal machine with steel sparred wings with duralumin and steel ribs. It was a single bay biplane with staggered wings of almost equal span and sharp, 10° sweepback. The airfoils were thick, the lower thicker and the upper wings carried leading edge automatic slots for low speed control. The wings could be folded from the centre section for carrier stowage. The lower wing centre section had anhedral to allow a shorter undercarriage and also carried a pair of underwing radiators. The undercarriage was of the fixed, split axle type required for torpedo launches, with torpedo crutches between the legs and there was a small, spatted tailwheel. For carrier landing there was a hinged arrestor hook ending just in front of the tailwheel. The three crew sat in separate open cockpits, the pilot in front under a cut-out in the upper wing trailing edge, his navigator behind him and furthest aft the gunner with a Lewis gun on a Scarff ring. The fin was large and rounded with a generous rudder, a little like that of the later Gladiator, with the tailplane braced from above to the fin.

== Operational history ==
After flight trials at Gloster's the TSR.38 went to RAF Gosport where it made dummy carrier landing before joining HMS Courageous in August 1934 for real naval tests. It then returned to Martlesham for a thorough evaluation. However, its rather dilatory development now caught up with it in the form of a superior, later private venture from Fairey, which was to become the famous Fairey Swordfish and further work on the TSR.38 was ended.

A design for pure reconnaissance variant was submitted to the Royal Australian Navy in 1931 but was not successful.

== Specifications (TSR.38, reconnaissance configuration) ==
Data from James 1971, pp. 203–204

General characteristics

- Crew: 3
- Length: 37 ft 4.5 in (11.4 m)
- Wingspan: 46 ft 0 in (14.0 m)
- Height: 11 ft 6 in (3.5 m)
- Wing area: 611 sq ft (56.6 m^{2})
- Empty weight: 4,340 lb (1,968 kg)
- Gross weight: 7,100 lb (3,220 kg)
- Powerplant: 1 × 12-cylinder V-12 evaporatively-cooled supercharged Rolls-Royce Goshawk , 690 hp (515 kW)

Performance

- Maximum speed: 152 mph (244 km/h, 132 kn) at sea level
- Rate of climb: 1,026 ft/min (5.21 m/s) to 10,000 ft (3,048 m)

Armament

- 1 × forward firing synchronised 0.303 in (7.7 mm) Vickers machine gun
- 1 × 0.303 in (7.7 mm) ring-mounted Lewis gun
