= Westland Wizard =

Type of aircraft

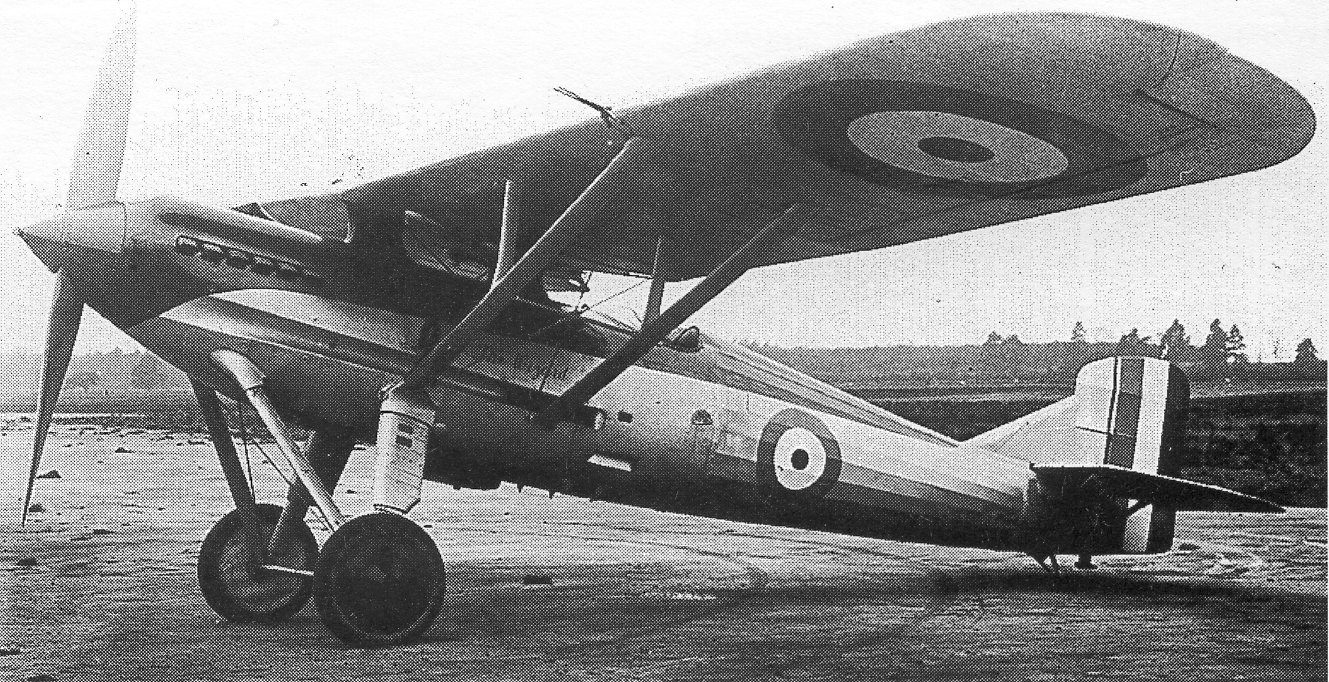
- Original Falcon-engined form

General information
- Type: Fighter aircraft
- National origin: United Kingdom
- Manufacturer: Westland Aircraft
- Status: Retired
- Number built: 1

History
- Introduction date: 1928
- First flight: November 1927
- Retired: 1928

The Westland Wizard was Westland Aircraft's first attempt to produce a monoplane fighter. The project was privately funded and the prototype design was done in the spare time of the company's engineers. This all happened during 1926, with high-speed performance as the primary goal.

== Design and development ==
Development of the aircraft later known as the Westland Wizard began in 1925, when some of the company's engineers drew up, in their spare time, the design for a single seat racing aircraft, the Westland Racer. This was a parasol monoplane, of mixed construction, with a Duralumin and steel-tube forward fuselage covered with metal and fabric skinning, a wood and fabric rear fuselage and a wooden wing. The Westland Widgeon, also a monoplane, had influenced the designers in their choice of wing arrangement. After receiving permission from Westland's management, a prototype was constructed, powered by a surplus 275 hp (205 kW) Rolls-Royce Falcon III engine salvaged from the prototype Westland Limousine transport after the Limousine was wrecked in a taxying accident.

The Racer made its maiden flight in the spring of 1926. Later that year, however, it was badly damaged in an emergency landing at Westland's Yeovil factory. It was decided to rebuild the aircraft as a fighter, with a new, all-metal, fuselage. The Falcon was replaced by one of Rolls-Royce's new F.XI (later known as the Kestrel engines giving 490 hp (366 kW) in a more streamlined nose, while two Vickers machine guns were mounted semi-externally in the fuselage sides. It retained the wooden parasol wing of the Racer, which was mounted close to the fuselage on tandem pylons on the fuselage centreline. The undercarriage was of tailwheel type, while the thick section wing allowed the aircraft's fuel tanks to be buried in the wing, saving space in the fuselage while keeping wing drag low, also allowing a gravity feed to the engine and reducing fire risks. The cockpit was more or less in line with the trailing edge of the wing. The seat was of such a height that the pilot's eyes were in the neighbourhood of being level with the wing. This enabled him to look either over or under the wing. The height of the seat was adjustable on the ground, and the rudder bar could be set up for two positions to suit different pilots.

The rebuilt aircraft, now known as the Wizard, flew in November 1927.

The Wizard was fast and had impressive climb performance, and was tested by the Aeroplane and Armament Experimental Establishment (A&AEE) at RAF Martlesham Heath from the end of January 1928. While the A&AEEs test pilots praised the Wizard's performance, they criticised the pilot's forward view and considered the aileron control loads too heavy. During the summer of 1928, the Wizard made its first public appearance at the Royal Air Force Display at Hendon, among the other new single-seater fighters. The Wizard attracted a great deal of attention, mainly because of its clean lines and generally attractive appearance, as well as its unusual layout. (Parasol monoplane designs had not been in service with the Royal Air Force since the days of the First World War, when a number of Morane-Saulnier's were used. Since then the RAF had used biplanes or at most sesquiplanes for its fighters).

The Air Ministry remained interested in the Wizard and gave Westland a contract to further develop the Wizard. It was fitted with a new, all-metal wing of increased span and reduced chord. In order to improve the view for the pilot, the wing was fitted with a much thinner centre section and was mounted on more conventional cabane strutting. It had new inset ailerons. The engine was also replaced by a supercharged 500 hp (373 kW) Rolls-Royce F.XIS. In this form it was known as the Wizard II.

The Wizard II had lower performance than the earlier version, and did not impress the Air Ministry sufficiently for it to override its long standing preference for biplane fighters.

== Specifications (Mk.II) ==
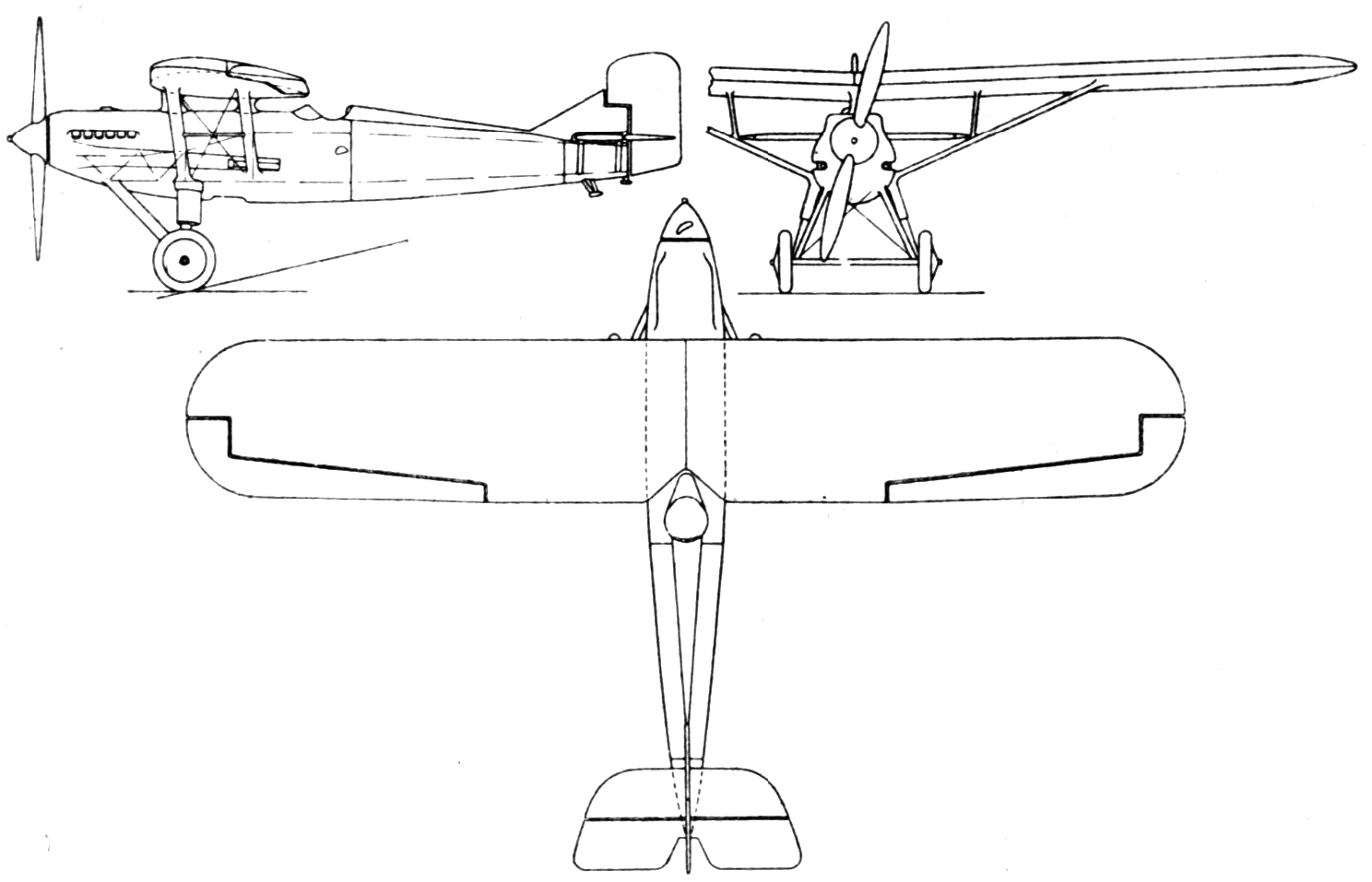
Westland Wizard 3-View drawing from L'Air January 1, 1929

Data from The Westland "Wizard".

General characteristics

- Crew: 1
- Length: 26 ft 10 in (8.18 m)
- Wingspan: 39 ft 6 in (12.04 m)
- Height: 9 ft 4 in (2.84 m)
- Wing area: 238 sq ft (22.1 m^{2})
- Airfoil: RAF 34
- Empty weight: 2,467 lb (1,119 kg)
- Gross weight: 3,326 lb (1,509 kg)
- Fuel capacity: 68 imp gal (82 US gal; 309 L) fuel; 5 imp gal (6 US gal; 23 L)
- Powerplant: 1 × Rolls-Royce F.XI V-12 liquid-cooled piston engine, 490 hp (370 kW)
- Propellers: 2-bladed Watts wooden fixed-pitch propeller, 10 ft 2 in (3.10 m) diameter

Performance

- Maximum speed: 188 mph (303 km/h, 163 kn) at 10,000 ft (3,048 m)
- Endurance: 30 minutes at ground level; plus 2 hours at 15,000 ft (4,572 m)
- Service ceiling: 17,500 ft (5,300 m)
- Rate of climb: 1,945 ft/min (9.88 m/s) at 10,000 ft (3,048 m)

Armament

- Guns: 2 × Vickers machine guns
- Bombs: 4 × 20 pound high explosive bombs.

== See also ==
- Monoplane
- Westland Aircraft

Aircraft of comparable role, configuration, and era

- Westland Widgeon

Related lists

- List of Air Ministry specifications
