= Short Gurnard =

Single-engined two-seat biplane naval fighter

S.10 Gurnard
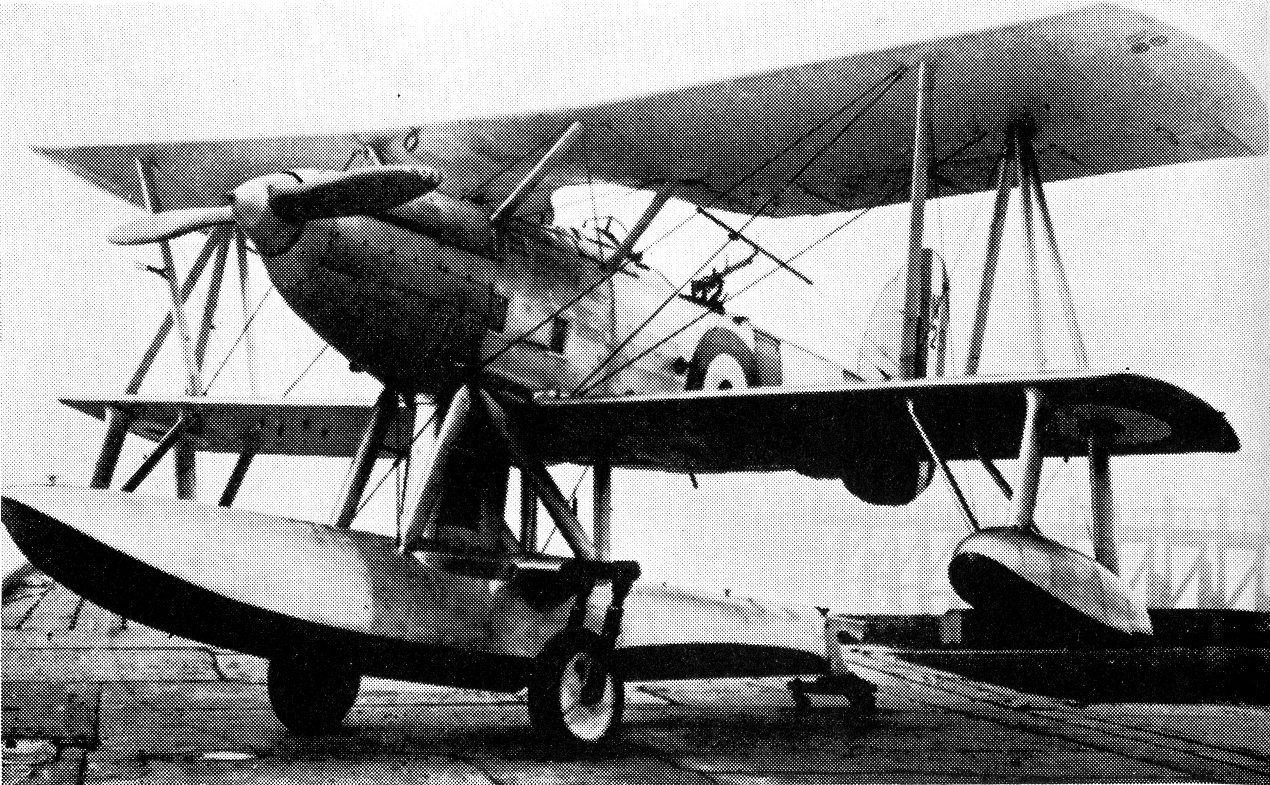
- The Gurnard II as an amphibian

General information
- Type: Fleet fighter
- National origin: United Kingdom
- Manufacturer: Short Brothers
- Number built: 2

History
- First flight: 16 April 1929

The Short Gurnard was a single-engined two-seat biplane naval fighter, built in the United Kingdom to an Air Ministry specification in 1929. It failed to win production orders and only two flew.

== Design and development ==
The duralumin-framed Short Sturgeon had never been expected to achieve production status, but the Air Ministry were sufficiently impressed with its behaviour on water and in the air to invite Shorts to tender for Air Ministry specification O.22/26, a two-seat fleet fighter. The specification sought a Fairey Flycatcher replacement, an aircraft that would spend much time in fleet spotter and reconnaissance roles, though without the third crew member the navy usually thought necessary for the latter task; but it also was to have the speed and rate of climb to catch bombers. It was required to be able to perform as a deck lander or a seaplane, and to be strong enough in either configuration to be launched by catapult. Shorts were advised that their duralumin monocoque fuselage was not suitable for below deck maintenance. Their tender was rewarded with an order for two prototypes of the S.10 Gurnard.

As a result of the Air Ministry comments, the fuselage of the Gurnard was quite different from Shorts recent series of single-engined monocoques. It was a welded steel tube structure with duralumin detachable panels forward and fabric covering aft. The two separate open cockpits were very close together, the pilot sitting in front just under a visibility cut-out in the trailing edge of the upper wing, raised up for a better view over the nose. A 0.303 in (7.7 mm) Vickers machine gun operated by the pilot was mounted on the decking in front of him, slightly to port. The rear cockpit was fitted with a Lewis gun on a Scarff ring. The steel fuselage stopped at the rear with an attachment for the only monocoque part of the Gurnard, the empennage-carrying tail cone. The fin and rudder leading edge was rounded, the trailing edge of the horn balanced rudder straight. The latter extended below the fuselage, with additional fixed surface in front of it. These surfaces were fabric covered.

The two Gurnard prototypes had different engines. The Gurnard II, the first to be completed, had a 525 hp (392 kW) Rolls-Royce Kestrel IIS supercharged water-cooled inline and the Gurnard I a 525 hp Bristol Jupiter X supercharged radial engine. Accordingly, the Gurnard II had a smooth and pointed cowling, with a drum-shaped radiator between the undercarriage legs, whilst the radial engine had a narrow chord Townend ring, with the rear part of its cylinders visible from the side.

The Gurnard was a single-bay biplane. It had straight-edged, constant chord wings, the lower one being slightly shorter in span and markedly narrower in chord. Both wings carried dihedral, the upper plane the most. The wings were duralumin structures, fabric covered, with simple, near-parallel interplane struts between the spars. The centre section was supported by a pair of struts from the upper fuselage on each side. Long Frise ailerons were fitted to the upper wing only.

The wheeled undercarriage was a simple single-axle arrangement, with oleo legs forward to the engine bulkhead and rearward bracing struts to the root of the rear wing spar. There was a rather long tailskid to protect the downward-extended fin. The seaplane version used a pair of floats, their low drag profile refined via Schneider Trophy experience, cross braced with a pair of horizontal transverse struts. They were mounted with N-shaped struts which sloped strongly outwards from the fuselage.

The Gurnard II, fitted with floats, was the first to fly, taking off from the Medway off Shorts' Rochester factory on 16 April 1929. The pilot was John Lankester Parker. In May both Gurnards flew as landplanes from Lympne, where Shorts maintained a base. By early June both aircraft were at RAF Martlesham Heath for evaluation against the specification, though they both returned briefly to Shorts for some modifications. The water-based testing was done at the Marine Aircraft Experimental Establishment at Felixstowe. The Gurnards flew well and met the specifications, but were out-performed by the Hawker Osprey, a close relative of the RAF's established bomber the Hawker Hart, so no more Gurnards were produced. Shorts did get a useful order for large numbers of their floats for the Ospreys.

The Gurnard II returned from Martlesham to Rochester in 1931 for conversion into an amphibian. This involved the fitting of a single, central float which carried a pair of wheels using an axle that passed through its top. The wheels were on stubs offset from the axle, so that in one position they were lifted above the water, but rotated through 180° from the pilot's cockpit they reached the ground. A similar, smaller version had been used successfully on the Short Mussel and on a converted Moth. The central float was again mounted with a pair of N-shaped struts, now vertical. There was a pair of outboard stabilising floats beyond the interplane struts, each mounted on a pair of vertical legs. The floats were each directly braced with a pair of struts to the interplane struts from below, and from above by a pair of struts from the top of the rear interplane strut to the tops of the legs. It first flew in this configuration in June 1931 and returned to Martlesham within the month, appearing in that year's Hendon RAF Display.

After that it came back for while to Rochester, where it was used to investigate cooling of the Kestrel engine. At this time it was flying with a tall pillar radiator between fuselage and float. In October the float was modified, and later that month six flights were made between Lympne airfield (land) and the Medway (water) in a total of 90 minutes. In December it returned to Felixstowe, where it served as an engine and cooling system test-bed.

== Specifications (Gurnard I, landplane) ==
Data from Barnes & James 1989, p. 216

General characteristics

- Length: 28 ft 7 in (8.71 m)
- Wingspan: 37 ft 0 in (11.28 m)
- Wing area: 429 sq ft (39.9 m^{2})
- Empty weight: 3,086 lb (1,400 kg)
- Gross weight: 4,785 lb (2,170 kg)
- Powerplant: 1 × Bristol Jupiter X 9-cylinder radial, 525 hp (391 kW)

Performance

- Maximum speed: 160 mph (260 km/h, 140 kn)
- Endurance: 3.5 hrs

Armament

- Guns: 1× 0.303 in (7.7 mm) Vickers machine gun firing forward from the top decking in front of the pilot and 1× 0.303 in (7.7 mm) Lewis gun on a Scarff ring in rear cockpit

== See also ==
Aircraft of comparable role, configuration, and era

- Blackburn Nautilus
- Fairey Fleetwing

Related lists

- List of fighter aircraft
- List of flying boats and floatplanes
