= Hawker P.V.3 =

Type of aircraft

General information
- Type: Day and night fighter
- Manufacturer: Hawker
- Designer: Sydney Camm
- Number built: 1

History
- First flight: 15 June 1934

The Hawker P.V.3 was a British single-engined biplane fighter prototype of the 1930s. Only a single example was built, the Gloster Gladiator being selected instead to fulfill the requirement to which it was designed.

== Design and development ==
In 1930 the British Air Ministry circulated a draft version of Specification F.7/30 for a heavily armed day and night fighter around likely manufacturers. The new fighter was to have a speed of at least 250 mph (400 km/h) and a good climb rate. As it was expected that the high speeds of both the fighter and its prospective targets would only allow short bursts of fire to hit the target, an armament of four Vickers machine guns was required, double that of earlier fighters. Although not a requirement of the specification, the Air Ministry encouraged the use of the new steam-cooled Rolls-Royce Goshawk engine.

To meet this requirement, Hawker Aircraft submitted two designs, one a monoplane and the other a biplane, but both were rejected by the Air Ministry when contracts were awarded for prototypes in 1932, orders going to Blackburn Aircraft (for its F.3) and Westland Aircraft (the Westland F.7/30). Despite this rejection, Hawker decided to construct a single example of its biplane design, the Hawker P.V.3 as a Private Venture without an Air Ministry order. The P.V.3, design of which was led by Hawker's Chief Designer Sidney Camm, was an enlarged development of Hawker's Fury fighter, powered by the preferred Goshawk. Like the Fury, it had an all-metal structure with fabric covered wings (which unlike the Fury were swept back), tail and aft fuselage, with a metal skinned forward fuselage. Steam condensers for the Goshawk engine were fitted in the upper wing, supplemented by a smaller retractable condenser under the fuselage. It had a fixed tailwheel undercarriage with spats covering the mainwheels to reduce drag. Two machine guns were mounted at the top of the nose cowling, with two more machine guns mounted one on each side of the nose.

The P.V.3 made its maiden flight on 15 June 1934, piloted by George Bulman and powered by a 695 hp (518 kW) Goshawk II engine. Official trials of the F7/30 types were delayed until 1935 owing to problems with some of the other competitors, and Hawker used the delay to fit a slightly more powerful version of the Goshawk. While the P.V.3 was praised for its handling and performance during testing at RAF Martlesham Heath, no order resulted, as in the meantime Gloster's Gladiator, another Private Venture design, had been ordered into production. The Gladiator was powered by an air-cooled Bristol Mercury radial engine, and so avoided any need for a heavy and vulnerable steam condensor system.

== Specifications ==
Data from Hawker Aircraft since 1920.

General characteristics

- Crew: 1
- Length: 28 ft 2 in (8.59 m)
- Wingspan: 34 ft 0 in (10.36 m)
- Height: 10 ft 5 in (3.18 m)
- Wing area: 290.5 sq ft (26.99 m^{2})
- Empty weight: 3,530 lb (1,601 kg)
- Gross weight: 4,670 lb (2,118 kg)
- Max takeoff weight: 4,850 lb (2,200 kg)
- Powerplant: 1 × Rolls-Royce Goshawk B.43 steam-cooled V12 engine, 700 hp (520 kW)

Performance

- Maximum speed: 224 mph (360 km/h, 195 kn) at 14,000 ft (4,270 m)
- Service ceiling: 29,600 ft (9,000 m)
- Time to altitude: 4 min 20 s to 10,000 ft (3,050 m), 12 min 5 s to 20,000 ft (6,100 m)

Armament

- Guns: 4 × 0.303 in (7.7 mm) Vickers machine guns, 450 rounds each
