= Bristol Type 133 =

Monoplane prototype

Type 133
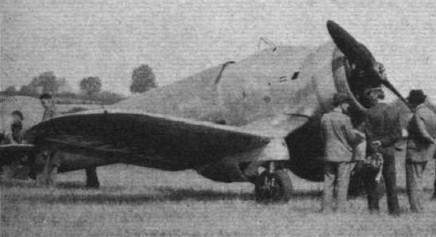

General information
- Type: Single-seat fighter
- National origin: United Kingdom
- Manufacturer: Bristol Aeroplane Company
- Designer: Frank Barnwell
- Number built: 1

History
- First flight: 8 June 1934

The Bristol Type 133 was a single-seat, single-engine monoplane fighter armed with four guns, using stressed-skin construction and with a retractable undercarriage. It was built by The Bristol Aeroplane Co. to meet Specification F.7/30. The single example crashed before the trials commenced.

== Development ==
Specification F.7/30 called for a four-gun fighter with better high-altitude performance and endurance than current fighters, outstanding climb rate, manoeuvrability and all-round vision combined with a low landing speed. A preference was expressed for the use of the experimental evaporatively-cooled Rolls-Royce Goshawk engine. None of Bristol's three design submissions were chosen for official prototype orders, but one, the Goshawk-engined Bristol Type 123 was built as a private venture contender. At the same time Bristol started work on a second design.

Powered by a Bristol Mercury radial engine, the Type 133 was a low-wing cantilever monoplane and was the first aircraft intended for RAF service to have a retractable undercarriage. It was also the first Bristol aircraft to use stressed-skin construction for the wings, using recently invented Alclad sheets. The wings were of constant chord with rounded tips and of cranked, or inverted gull wing, form, with negative dihedral in the centre section and positive dihedral beyond. The fabric-covered ailerons extended over the whole of the outer wing and could be lowered symmetrically (drooped) in lieu of flaps. The horizontal tail was of quite high aspect ratio and aluminium-covered, carrying horn-balanced, fabric-covered elevators. The rudder was similarly horn-balanced and fabric-covered.

The rear fuselage was an aluminium monocoque and the forward fuselage was alclad-skinned over a tubular steel structure. The pilot's open cockpit was situated over the wing at mid-chord. The Mercury engine was enclosed in a long-chord cowling. One advantage of the cranked wing was that it reduced the length of the undercarriage, making retraction easier. The main wheels of the Type 133 retracted fully into bath-type fairings under the wings; this was done hydraulically, using a handpump. Two of the four machine guns were fitted in the wing just outboard of the undercarriage fairing, the other two being on either side of the nose.

Carrying the experimental marking R-10 the Type 133 first flew on 8 June 1934 piloted by Cyril Uwins, who was impressed. Testing over the next eight months produced some modifications including the addition of a sliding canopy and a crash pylon, better brakes, an enlarged rudder and the replacement of the tailskid with a castoring tailwheel. Engine exhaust and cooling were also improved. The long-span ailerons were shortened and combined with centre section split flaps. The aircraft was almost ready to attend the competitive tests at RAF Martlesham Heath when W. T. Campbell entered a spin with the undercarriage unintentionally down. An irrecoverable flat spin developed and Campbell had to abandon the aircraft. This ended Bristol's interest in the specification F.7/30 competition, which was won by the Gloster Gladiator.

== Specifications ==
Data from Barnes 1970, p. 248

General characteristics

- Length: 28 ft 0 in (8.53 m)
- Wingspan: 39 ft 0 in (11.89 m)
- Height: 9 ft 9 in (2.97 m)
- Wing area: 247 sq ft (22.95 m^{2})
- Empty weight: 3,332 lb (1,509 kg)
- Gross weight: 4,738 lb (2,149 kg)
- Powerplant: 1 × Bristol Mercury VIS.2 9-cylinder single-row radial , 640 hp (477 kW)

Performance

- Maximum speed: 260 mph (418 km/h, 230 kn)

Armament

- 4 × 0.303 in (7.7 mm) Vickers machine guns, 2 in wings and 2 in fuselage
