= Rolls-Royce Goshawk =

1930s British piston aircraft engine

Goshawk
- Type: Piston V12 aero engine
- Manufacturer: Rolls-Royce Limited
- First run: 1933
- Major applications: see § Applications
- Number built: 20
- Developed from: Rolls-Royce Kestrel

The Rolls-Royce Goshawk was a development of the Rolls-Royce Kestrel that used evaporative or steam cooling. In line with Rolls-Royce convention of naming piston engines after birds of prey, it was named after the goshawk.

The engine first ran in 1933 and provided 660 horsepower (490 kW). Only a few engines were built as the aircraft designs intended to use it were not adopted by the Royal Air Force. The Goshawk was used to power the Short Knuckleduster, the Supermarine Type 224 (a predecessor to the Supermarine Spitfire) and other prototype aircraft.

== Design and development ==
The Goshawk was developed from the Kestrel IV prototype engine, to use evaporative (also known as "steam") cooling. Rather than keep the cooling liquid below its boiling point in the cooling system, the coolant was allowed to boil; the phase change from liquid to vapour takes more heat from the engine, so less weight of coolant is needed. However, the radiator had to be bulkier to accommodate coolant in its gas phase, which increased drag.

Twenty engines were built, and flew only in prototypes as a few manufacturers' private ventures and "one-offs". Powers for individual installations are quoted between 650 and 700 hp (520 kW). Problems with coolant leaks, coolant pumping and the realisation that large wing-mounted condensing radiators would be vulnerable to combat damage caused the project to be cancelled, although valuable lessons had been learned and were put to good use with development of the later Merlin.

== Variants ==
Goshawk I
(1932) Developed from the prototype Kestrel IV.
Goshawk II
(1935) 600 hp. Lowered propeller reduction gear ratio.
Goshawk III
(1935) 600hp. Further reduction of gear ratio.
Goshawk VI
660 hp. High ratio reduction gear.
Goshawk VII
660 hp. Raised reduction gear ratio.
Goshawk VIII
660 hp. Special experimental engine. Maximum power output: 837 hp.

== Applications ==
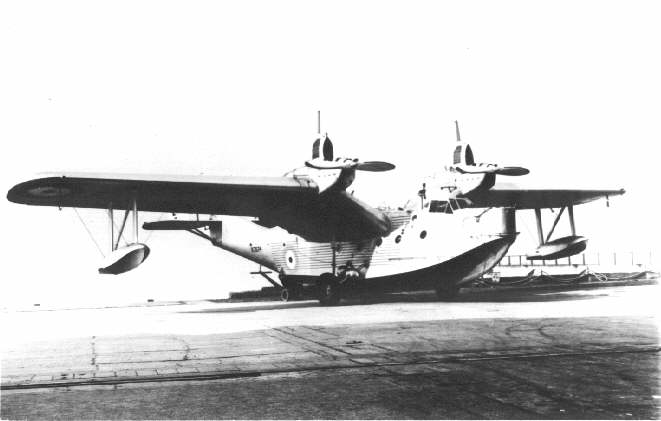
Goshawk powered Short Knuckleduster

The Goshawk was the power unit specified for the twin engined Short Knuckleduster flying boat (K3574) to Specification R24/31 and "preferred" for submissions to Air Ministry specification F7/30 for a fighter aircraft. Goshawks were used by all three officially sponsored prototypes, the Supermarine Type 224 (K2890), the Westland F.7/30 (K2891) and the Blackburn F3 (K2892), which only taxied with the Goshawk fitted and did not fly, in addition to two private venture entrants, the Bristol Type 123 and the Hawker P.V.3.

The Goshawk also powered Hawker's privately developed "High Speed Fury Mk 2" (K3586) and "Intermediate Fury" 2" (the latter Hawker's own development aircraft and "hack" serial G-ABSE) and the Westland Pterodactyl V (K2770) and was installed for trials in the Gloster TSR.38 (S1705), and the first Gloster Gnatsnapper prototype (N227).

=== Application list ===
- Blackburn F3
- Bristol Type 123
- Gloster Gnatsnapper
- Gloster TSR.38
- Hawker Fury
- Hawker P.V.3
- Supermarine Type 224
- Westland Pterodactyl V
- Westland F.7/30 (sometimes called the Westland P.V.4)

== Specifications (Goshawk I) ==
Data from Lumsden

=== General characteristics ===
- Type: 12-cylinder liquid-cooled 60 degree Vee aircraft piston engine
- Bore: 5.0 in (127 mm)
- Stroke: 5.5 in (140 mm)
- Displacement: 1,295.88 in^{3} (21.25 L)
- Length: 74.61 in (1,895 mm)
- Width: 24.41 in (620 mm)
- Height: 35.63 in (905 mm)
- Dry weight: 975 lb (442 kg)

=== Components ===
- Valvetrain: OHC - Overhead Camshaft
- Supercharger: Single-stage supercharger
- Fuel type: 77 Octane petrol
- Cooling system: Liquid-cooled

=== Performance ===
- Power output: 600 bhp (447 kW) at 2,600 rpm
- Specific power: 0.46 hp/in^{3} (21 kW/L)
- Compression ratio: 6:1
- Power-to-weight ratio: 0.61 hp/lb (1 kW/kg)

== See also ==
Related development

- Rolls-Royce Kestrel

Comparable engines

- Curtiss D-12
- Fairey Prince (V-12)
- Packard 1A-1500

Related lists

- List of aircraft engines
