= Vickers Type 163 =

Type 163
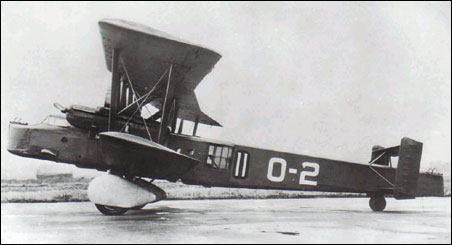

General information
- Type: Bomber
- Manufacturer: Vickers
- Status: Prototype only
- Number built: 1

History
- First flight: 12 January 1931

The Vickers Type 163 was a prototype British biplane bomber design of the 1930s, built by Vickers-Armstrong.

It was based on the Vickers Vanox (Vickers Type 150), scaled up to accommodate four engines mounted in pairs. It was submitted both as a bomber and as a troop carrier to Air Ministry specifications B.19/27 and C.16/28 respectively, first flying on 12 January 1931. Only one was produced.

== Specifications (Type 163) ==
Data from The British Bomber since 1914

General characteristics

- Crew: 4
- Capacity: provision for ten armed troops
- Length: 66 ft 9 in (20.35 m)
- Wingspan: 90 ft 0 in (27.43 m)
- Height: 22 ft 4 in (6.81 m)
- Wing area: 1,948 sq ft (181.0 m^{2})
- Gross weight: 25,700 lb (11,657 kg)
- Powerplant: 4 × Rolls-Royce F.XIVS evaporatively-cooled V12 engines, 480 hp (360 kW) each

Performance

- Maximum speed: 160 mph (260 km/h, 140 kn) at 6,500 ft (2,000 m)
- Range: 1,150 mi (1,850 km, 1,000 nmi) at 140 mph (120 kn; 230 km/h)
- Service ceiling: 25,200 ft (7,700 m)
- Time to altitude: 18 min 15 s to 10,000 ft (3,000 m)

Armament

- Guns: 2 × .303 in (7.7 mm) Lewis Guns (nose and tail gunners positions)
- Bombs:
  - Up to 12 × 250 lb (110 kg) bombs under fuselage and
  - 4 × 20 lb (9.1 kg) bombs
