= Bristol Type 123 =

Type 123
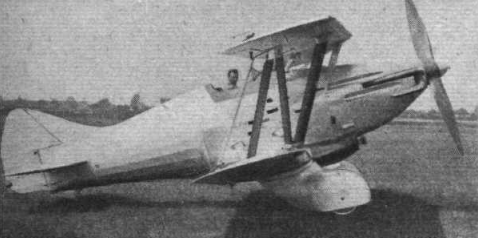

General information
- Type: Single-seat fighter
- National origin: United Kingdom
- Manufacturer: Bristol Aeroplane Company
- Number built: 1

History
- First flight: 12 June 1934

The Bristol Type 123 was a single-seat, single-engine biplane fighter built to a United Kingdom Air Ministry specification for a four-gun fighter in the early 1930s. Only one was built.

== Development ==
In late 1931 the Air Ministry released Air Ministry specification F.7/30. This was for a four-gun fighter with better high-altitude performance and endurance than current fighters, outstanding climb rate, manoeuvrability and all-round vision combined with a low landing speed. It was made clear that the evaporatively-cooled Rolls-Royce Goshawk was the preferred engine. The best-known outcome of this specification was the crank-winged Supermarine Type 224 monoplane with an open cockpit and fixed undercarriage designed by R.J. Mitchell. Bristol submitted several biplane designs, none of which brought an order for a prototype, but they were invited to offer a private-venture aircraft.

The Bristol Type 123 was the result. Bristol's last biplane, it was of compact, striking appearance and had innovative control features. It was a single-bay biplane with wings of constant chord almost to the tips and a pronounced stagger. The upper wings were swept and without dihedral, the cantilever lower wings were unswept with 6° of dihedral. Both wings carried full-span ailerons. The upper wing also carried full-span Leading edge slots, arranged in inner and outer groups. The ailerons were linked to slot interceptors behind the outer slots which rose when the inner slots opened at high angles of attack. As this happened, the ailerons drooped symmetrically. The slot-plus-interceptor combination was intended to prevent a stall turning into a spin and had been tested by Handley Page on a de Havilland Moth and later by Bristol on a Bulldog. Rudder and elevators were horn balanced, the latter carrying trim tabs. The wings, empennage and fuselage behind the cockpit were all fabric covered over a metal structure.

The combination of a distinct stagger and a slender nose gave the Type 123 a slightly humpbacked appearance, with the pilot's open cockpit at the top above the centre of the lower wing and well behind the trailing edge of the upper wing. There were pairs of machine guns on either side of the engine. The undercarriage was fixed and almost enclosed in forward-thrusting fairings with a cross-axle between the wheels.

The aircraft was powered by a Goshawk III loaned by the Air Ministry, which used condensers in the lower wing leading edge for cooling, coupled to a forward-mounted ventral condenser. Engine cooling problems delayed the first flight, made by Cyril Uwins on 12 June 1934. Testing revealed serious lateral instability that a series of modifications to fin, rudder and the inner slots failed to cure and which might have been structural. Development was therefore abandoned.

== Specifications ==
Data from Barnes 1970, p. 248

General characteristics

- Crew: one
- Length: 25 ft 2 in (7.67 m)
- Wingspan: 29 ft 7 in (9.02 m)
- Height: 9 ft 6 in (2.90 m)
- Wing area: 248 sq ft (23.04 m^{2})
- Empty weight: 3,300 lb (1,497 kg)
- Gross weight: 4,737 lb (2,149 kg)
- Powerplant: 1 × Rolls-Royce Goshawk III V-12 evaporatively-cooled , 695 hp (519 kW)

Performance

- Maximum speed: 235 mph (378 km/h, 204 kn)
