= Hawker Dantorp =

Single-engined biplane bomber of the 1930s

Dantorp
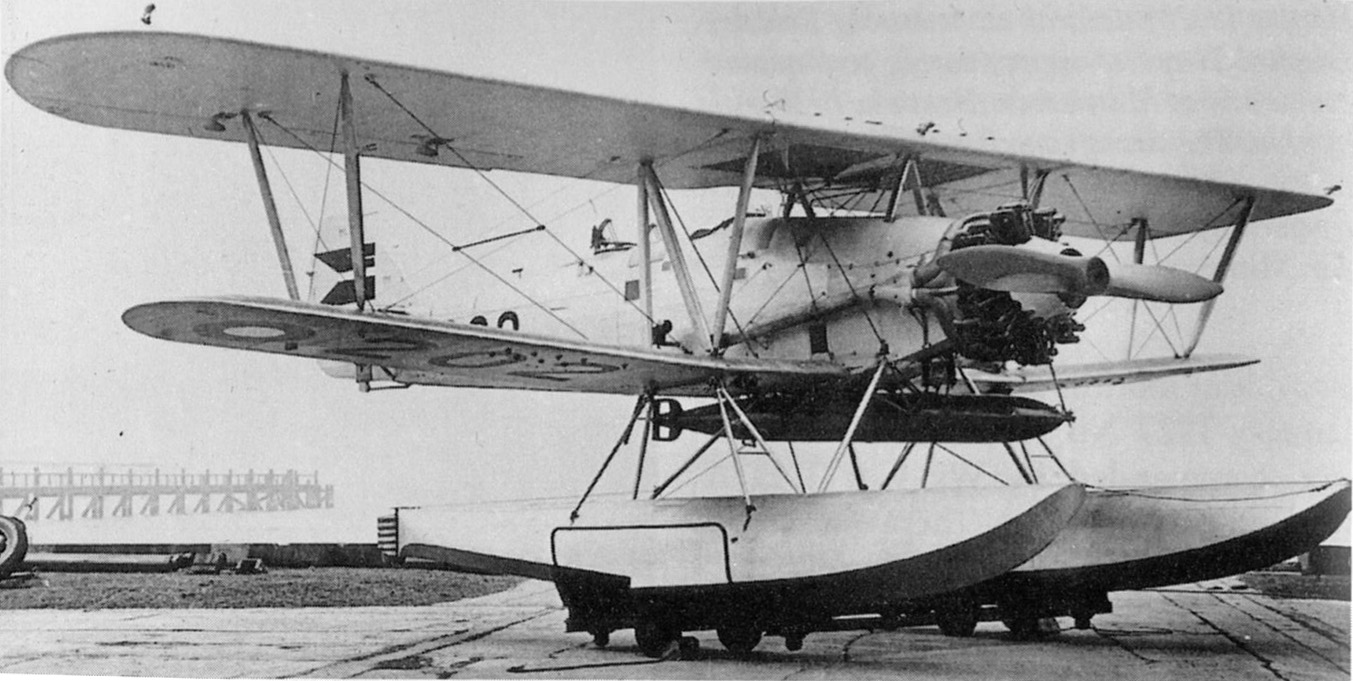
- The second Hawker Dantorp at Felixstowe, November 1932

General information
- Type: Torpedo bomber
- Manufacturer: Hawker Aircraft
- Primary user: Royal Danish Navy
- Number built: 2

History
- Introduction date: 1933
- First flight: 19 September 1932
- Retired: 1940

The Hawker Dantorp H.B. III was a Danish single-engined biplane bomber of the 1930s. The aircraft was a development of the British Hawker Horsley designed for the Danish Navy, but differed in being powered by a radial engine and having a third crew member. Two examples were built in Britain as a precursor to licensed production in Denmark. Financial constraints meant this was not realised and the Hawker-built examples were the only aircraft produced. They served until the German invasion of Denmark in 1940.

== Design and development ==
The Hawker Dantorp was derived from the successful Hawker Horsley. Originally designed to meet Air Ministry Specification 26/23 for a day bomber powered by a single Rolls-Royce Condor liquid-cooled engine, the Horsley entered service with the Royal Air Force in September 1927.

One example of the Horsley, serial number J8620, was equipped with an Armstrong Siddeley Leopard 14-cylinder twin-row air-cooled radial engine. The Leopard was the most powerful radial engine in the world at the time and in consequence promised much better performance. Meanwhile, another Horsley, J8612, had been equipped with floats and demonstrated that the aircraft could be operated from the water. The Danish Navy showed interest in these developments and, in 1930, ordered an aircraft type based on the design of the Horsley but equipped with the new engine and able to operate as a floatplane. The aircraft was to be known as the Dantorp and was given the service number H.B.III.

== Description ==
The Dantorp was a large single-engined two-bay biplane of composite wood and metal construction. Unlike the two seat Horsley, it had a crew of three, with an additional crew position between the pilot and observer/gunner. The aircraft mounted a forward-facing .303 in (7.7 mm) Vickers machine gun, a .303 in (7.7 mm) Lewis gun in a Scarff ring and could carry eight 50 kg (110 lb) bombs, two 551 kg (1,215 lb) bombs, one 1,500 lb (680 kg) bomb or a torpedo weighing 2,800 lb (1,300 kg).

The aircraft was equipped to operate using interchangeable wheeled undercarriage and floats. The floats were designed as separate structures to allow for the carriage of a torpedo under the fuselage.

== Operational history ==
The first Dantorp, serial number 201, was first flown on 19 September 1932, equipped with a wheeled undercarriage. The second, 202, followed shortly afterwards and was first tested with floats in November 1932. The aircraft were flown extensively in Denmark from 1933, but it took until 1935 for there to be good results from launching torpedoes. They were also tested as catapult-launched floatplanes for operations off warships. However, these trials did not lead to the adoption of the tactic by the Navy. The aircraft continued to be flown for the rest of the decade and both aircraft were operational when Germany invaded Denmark in 1940 although their subsequent history is unknown.

The Danish Navy purchased a licence to build a further ten aircraft at the Danish Naval Workshops (Orlogsvaerftet), but a shortage of funds meant that the licence was not taken up and no further aircraft were produced.

== Operators ==
Denmark

- Marinens Flyvevæsen Two examples.

== Specification ==
Data from Hawker Aircraft since 1920

General characteristics

- Crew: 3, pilot, navigator and bomb-aimer/gunner
- Length: 38 ft 4 1/2 in (11.697 m)
- Wingspan: 56 ft 5 3/4 in (17.215 m)
- Height: 14 ft 1 in (4.29 m)
- Wing area: 693 sq ft (64.4 m^{2})
- Empty weight: 5,360 lb (2,431 kg) (6,450 lb (2,930 kg) as a seaplane)
- Gross weight: 8,230 lb (3,733 kg) (9,420 lb (4,270 kg) as a seaplane)
- Fuel capacity: 230 imp gal (280 US gal; 1,000 L)
- Powerplant: 1 × Armstrong Siddeley Leopard IIIA air-cooled 14-cylinder twin-row radial engine, 805 hp (600 kW)
- Propellers: 2-bladed Watts wooden propeller

Performance

- Maximum speed: 126 mph (203 km/h, 109 kn) at 3,200 ft (980 m)
- Endurance: approx. 8.5 hr
- Service ceiling: 17,450 ft (5,320 m)
- Time to altitude: 12 min 50 s to 10,000 ft (3,000 m)

Armament

- Guns:
  - 1 × forward-firing .303 in (7.7 mm) Vickers machine gun
  - 1 × rear-mounted .303 in (7.7 mm) Lewis Gun
- Bombs: 1,500 lb (680 kg) bombload or 1 × torpedo

== See also ==
Related development

- Hawker Horsley

Aircraft of comparable role, configuration, and era

- Blackburn Shark
- Douglas XT3D
- Handley Page Handcross
- Latécoère 293
- Martin BM

Related lists

- List of military aircraft of Denmark
- List of flying boats and floatplanes
