= Blackburn Cubaroo =

British prototype biplane torpedo bomber

T.4 Cubaroo
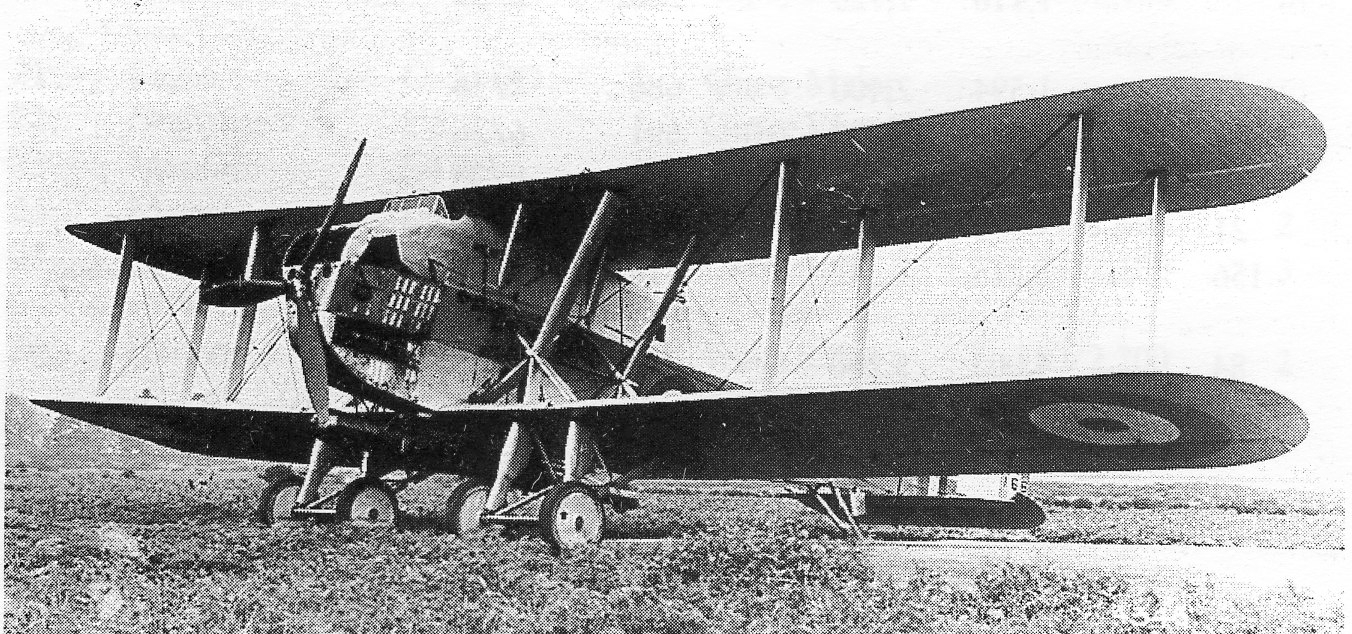

General information
- Type: Torpedo Bomber
- Manufacturer: Blackburn Aircraft
- Designer: F A Bumpus
- Status: Prototype
- Primary user: Royal Air Force
- Number built: 2

History
- First flight: 1924

The Blackburn T.4 Cubaroo was a British prototype biplane torpedo bomber of the 1920s. Built by Blackburn Aircraft and intended to carry a large 21 in (533 mm) torpedo, the Cubaroo was claimed to be the largest single-engined aircraft in the world at the time of its first flight.

== Design and development ==
In 1921, the British Air Ministry issued Specification 8/21 (previously Directorate of Research type IX) to Blackburn for a Coastal Defence Torpedo Aeroplane, for a long-range torpedo bomber with a range of over 800 mi (1,300 km) and the ability to carry a full size 21 in (533 mm) naval torpedo, which was at the time was thought capable of sinking the most heavily armoured warships. Previous torpedo bombers had used smaller, less capable torpedoes.

Blackburn Aircraft's chief designer, Major F. A. Bumpus, submitted the Blackburn T.4 Cubaroo, which was a massive biplane powered by a 1,000 hp (750 kW) 3,681 cu in (60.32 L) Napier Cub X-16 engine. Avro submitted and then withdrew their similarly powered Type 556, and replaced it with the Avro 557 Ava to a revised 16/22 specification which differed mainly in calling for two engines. The Ava was also a large biplane, but powered by two 600 hp (450 kW) 2,137.5 cu in (35.027 L) Rolls-Royce Condor V-12 engines.

To carry the heavy torpedo weighing over 2,000 lb (910 kg) for the required range, the Cubaroo was massive. With a wingspan of 88 ft 0 in (26.82 m), it was claimed at the time to be the largest single-engine military aircraft built, and it had the most powerful aircraft engine then available, the Napier Cub, which weighed over a ton, excluding the radiator. The first example, N166, had a curved radiator ahead of the engine in the nose, while the second, N167, had a flat one.

The Cubaroo, with a mainly steel tube metal structure, had an 11 ft (3.4 m) deep fuselage to accommodate the pilot who sat, with a navigator beside him, sitting over the engine. The rear of the fuselage had a triangle cross section to improve the gunner's fields of fire from hatches located near each lower wing root which permitted them to cover the underside of the tail. Bomb aiming was accomplished through a hatch in the floor of the cabin that also contained radio equipment and a navigational chart table. A passage ran aft to a ladder, which led up to another gunner's position, with a gun ring mounted on top of the fuselage just aft of the wing trailing edge.

The 88 ft 0 in (26.82 m) span, 11 ft 6 in (3.51 m) constant chord folding, two-bay wings had dihedral, and semi-circular wing tips, with inset unbalanced ailerons on all four wings running for about half the span. The empennage consisted of three balanced rudders, with the outer two having small fins, and an adjustable biplane horizontal stabilizer with a balanced elevator.

To carry the torpedo, the Cubaroo was fitted with a split undercarriage attached to the lower wings, each comprising two sets of two 4 ft (1.2 m) diameter Palmer wheels, with the torpedo or bombs being carried on a crutch under the fuselage, between them.

Due to the change of British Air Ministry policy favouring twin-engine designs for the role, a new specification, 16/22 was drawn up, and the type was not ordered into service. Although drawings were made for three different versions with two engines, none of these were built.

== Operational history ==
The first prototype (with serial N166) flew in secrecy in the summer of 1924, proving to have good handling characteristics, with the engine not causing problems, as the Napier Cub had already been test flown in an Avro Aldershot. It was then fitted with a metal, three-blade adjustable-pitch propeller and was delivered for testing at RAF Martlesham Heath but was written off after its undercarriage collapsed on 2 February 1925. A second prototype flew in 1925, but the Air Ministry had by then lost interest in single-engine heavy bombers, so the second prototype was used as an engine testbed, flying with the experimental 1,100 hp (820 kW) Beardmore Simoon diesel engine.

== Variants ==
T.4 Cubaroo Mk.I
Both prototypes as built, powered with one 1,000 hp (750 kW) X-16 Napier Cub.
T.4A Cubaroo Mk.II
Unbuilt 1927 project, powered with two 650 hp (480 kW) direct-drive V-12 Rolls Royce Condor IV
T.4B Cubaroo Mk.III
Unbuilt 1927 project, powered with two 650 hp (480 kW) geared V-12 Rolls-Royce Condor III
T.4C Cubaroo Mk.IV
Unbuilt 1927 project, powered with two 650 hp (480 kW) direct-drive V-12 Rolls-Royce Condor IV

== Operators ==
United Kingdom

- Royal Air Force - evaluation and engine testbed only.

== Specifications (Cubaroo) ==
Data from The British Bomber since 1914

General characteristics

- Crew: 4 (pilot, navigator, bomb-aimer/gunner and midships gunner)
- Length: 54 ft 0 in (16.46 m)
- Wingspan: 88 ft 0 in (26.82 m)
- Height: 19 ft 4 in (5.89 m)
- Empty weight: 9,632 lb (4,369 kg)
- Max takeoff weight: 19,020 lb (8,627 kg)
- Fuel capacity: Just under 2 long tons (2,000 kg)
- Powerplant: 1 × Napier Cub X-16 water-cooled piston engine, 1,000 hp (750 kW)
- Propellers: 2 or 3-bladed fixed-pitch propeller

Performance

- Maximum speed: 115 mph (185 km/h, 100 kn)
- Range: 1,800 mi (2,900 km, 1,600 nmi) under test conditions, without warload.
- Endurance: 10 hours
- Absolute ceiling: 11,800 ft (3,600 m)

Armament

- 3 × .303 in (7.7 mm) Lewis Guns, in mid-fuselage gunner's cockpit, and at hatches at lower wing roots

and

- 1 × 21 in (533 mm) naval torpedo or 4 × 550 lb (250 kg) bombs

== See also ==
Aircraft of comparable role, configuration, and era

- Avro 557 Ava
