= Avro 557 Ava =

Ava
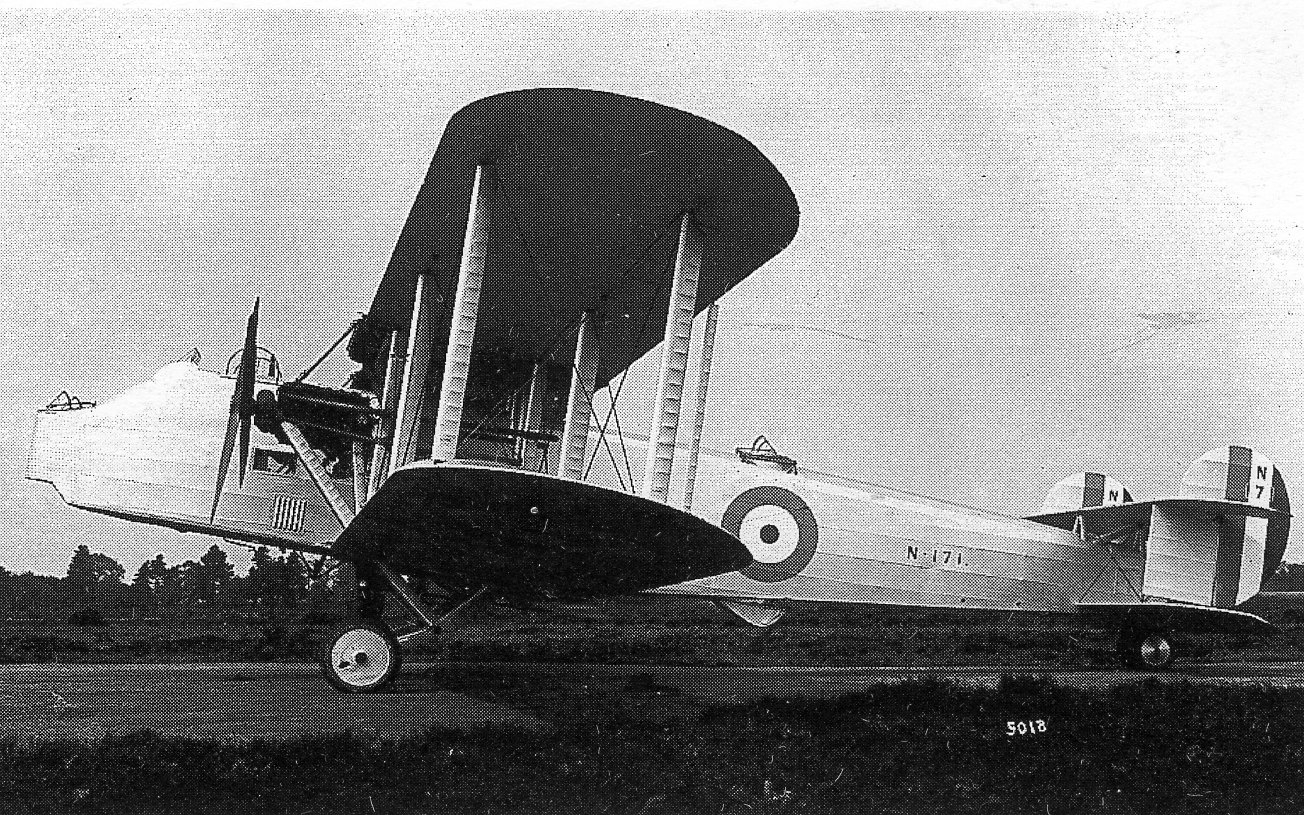

General information
- Type: Torpedo Bomber
- Manufacturer: Avro
- Designer: Roy Chadwick
- Status: Prototype
- Number built: 2

History
- First flight: 1924

The Avro Type 557 Ava was a British twin-engined biplane torpedo bomber of the 1920s. It was developed by Avro to meet a requirement for a heavy torpedo bomber for the Royal Air Force but was unsuccessful, only two prototypes being built.

== Design and development ==
The British Air Ministry produced Specification 16/22 in 1922 for a long-range land-based torpedo bomber. The specification required that the aircraft be capable of carrying a 21 in (533 mm) torpedo or an equivalent weight of bombs and produced responses both from Blackburn Aircraft (the Cubaroo) and Avro. Roy Chadwick, chief designer of Avro, initially produced a single-engined design, the Avro 556 powered by a Napier Cub engine, similar to the Cubaroo. This was rejected in favour of a twin-engined aircraft using two Rolls-Royce Condor engines, the Avro Type 557 Ava and winning an order for two prototypes from the Air Ministry. Completed in secret (owing to its armament of a 21 in (533 mm) torpedo, thought to be able to sink the largest warships), the first prototype Ava (serial number N171) flew in mid-1924.

The Ava was a three-bay biplane of wooden construction, with the un-cowled engines between the wings. It had a biplane tail, initially fitted with triple rudders, of which the centre rudder was soon removed. The fuselage accommodated two pilots in an open cockpit, with nose and dorsal gun positions and a retractable ventral "dustbin" gun position that could be manned by the navigator/bomb aimer, who otherwise occupied a large enclosed cabin. The 2,000 lb (910 kg) torpedo or equivalent bomb load were carried on external racks under the fuselage.

The Air Ministry dropped its plans to use the 21 in (533 mm) torpedo but Avro continued with construction of the second prototype, which was of all-metal construction but was otherwise similar to the first prototype, flying on 22 April 1927. While a modified version of the Ava was proposed to meet Specification B19/27 for a heavy bomber, it was unsuccessful, no further aircraft being built.

== Variants ==
Ava Mk I
First prototype. Wooden construction.
Ava Mk II
Second prototype. Metal construction.

== Specifications (Ava Mk I) ==
Data from The British Bomber since 1914

General characteristics

- Crew: 5
- Length: 58 ft 3 in (17.75 m)
- Wingspan: 96 ft 10 in (29.51 m)
- Height: 19 ft 7.75 in (5.9881 m)
- Wing area: 2,163 sq ft (200.9 m^{2})
- Empty weight: 12,760 lb (5,788 kg)
- Max takeoff weight: 19,920 lb (9,036 kg)
- Powerplant: 2 × Rolls-Royce Condor III V-12 water-cooled piston engines, 650 hp (480 kW) each
- Propellers: 2-bladed fixed-pitch propellers

Performance

- Maximum speed: 115 mph (185 km/h, 100 kn)

Armament

- Guns: 3 × 0.303 in (7.7 mm) Lewis Guns (Nose, dorsal and retractable ventral positions)
- Bombs: 1 × 21 in (553 mm) torpedo or 4 × 550 lb (250 kg) bombs

== See also ==
Aircraft of comparable role, configuration, and era

- Blackburn Cubaroo
