= Westland Yeovil =

Yeovil

General information
- Type: Bomber
- National origin: United Kingdom
- Manufacturer: Westland Aircraft
- Status: Retired
- Number built: 3

History
- First flight: 1925

The Westland Yeovil was a British biplane bomber designed and built by Westland Aircraft in 1923 to meet an Air Ministry specification for a single-engined day bomber.

== Development ==
The Yeovil was designed to meet Air Ministry Specification 26/23 for a single-engined day bomber, with a Rolls-Royce Condor engine specified by the ministry. It was a two-bay staggered biplane of composite wood and metal construction. It had a crew of two with the pilot in a cockpit at the front and the bomb aimer/gunner behind. It was powered by a nose-mounted tractor 665 hp (496 kW) Rolls-Royce Condor IIIA piston engine, fitted with a Leitner-Watts metal propeller.

The third prototype J7510.

Three prototypes were ordered. The first, J7508, made its first flight in 1925 from RAF Andover, with Captain Frank Courtney as the test pilot. The prototype was delivered to RAF Martlesham Heath for evaluation against the other aircraft built to meet the specification, the Hawker Horsley and the Bristol Berkeley. After evaluation, the Yeovil and Berkley were not ordered into production, and the Horsley had already been given a contract against a different specification. The three Yeovil prototypes continued to fly for a few years for research and testing.

== Specifications ==
Data from FLIGHT

General characteristics

- Crew: 2
- Length: 36 ft 10 in (11.23 m)
- Wingspan: 59 ft 6 in (18.14 m)
- Height: 14 ft 3 in (4.34 m)
- Wing area: 798 sq ft (74.1 m^{2})
- Empty weight: 4,658 lb (2,113 kg)
- Gross weight: 7,864 lb (3,567 kg)
- Powerplant: 1 × Rolls-Royce Condor V-12 water-cooled piston engine, 650 hp (480 kW)
- Propellers: 2-bladed fixed-pitch propeller

Performance

- Maximum speed: 120 mph (190 km/h, 100 kn)

Armament

- Guns: 1x fixed forward-firing machine gun, with two on a flexible mount in the rear cockpit

== See also ==
Aircraft of comparable role, configuration, and era

- Hawker Horsley
- Bristol Berkeley
- Handley Page H.P.28 Handcross

Related lists

- List of Air Ministry specifications
