= Vickers Vigilant (1920) =

100 seat Flying Boat

Vigilant

General information
- Type: Large flying boat airliner
- Manufacturer: Vickers
- Number built: None

The Vickers Vigilant was a 1920 project to build a British 100-seat flying boat designed by Vickers for transatlantic and Australian flights.

== Development and design ==
The flying boat was to be a biplane powered by eight Rolls-Royce Condor engines, each pair coupled to drive a shared tractor propeller. Its structure have been entirely duralumin. The project was cancelled and the flying boat was not built.

== Specifications ==
Data from Vickers Aircraft Since 1908

General characteristics

- Wingspan: 220 ft 0 in (67.06 m)
- Gross weight: 109,760 lb (49,786 kg)
- Powerplant: 8 × Rolls-Royce Condor

Performance

- Range: 2,000 mi (3,200 km, 1,700 nmi)

== See also ==
- Caproni Ca.60
