= Bristol Berkeley =

Berkeley
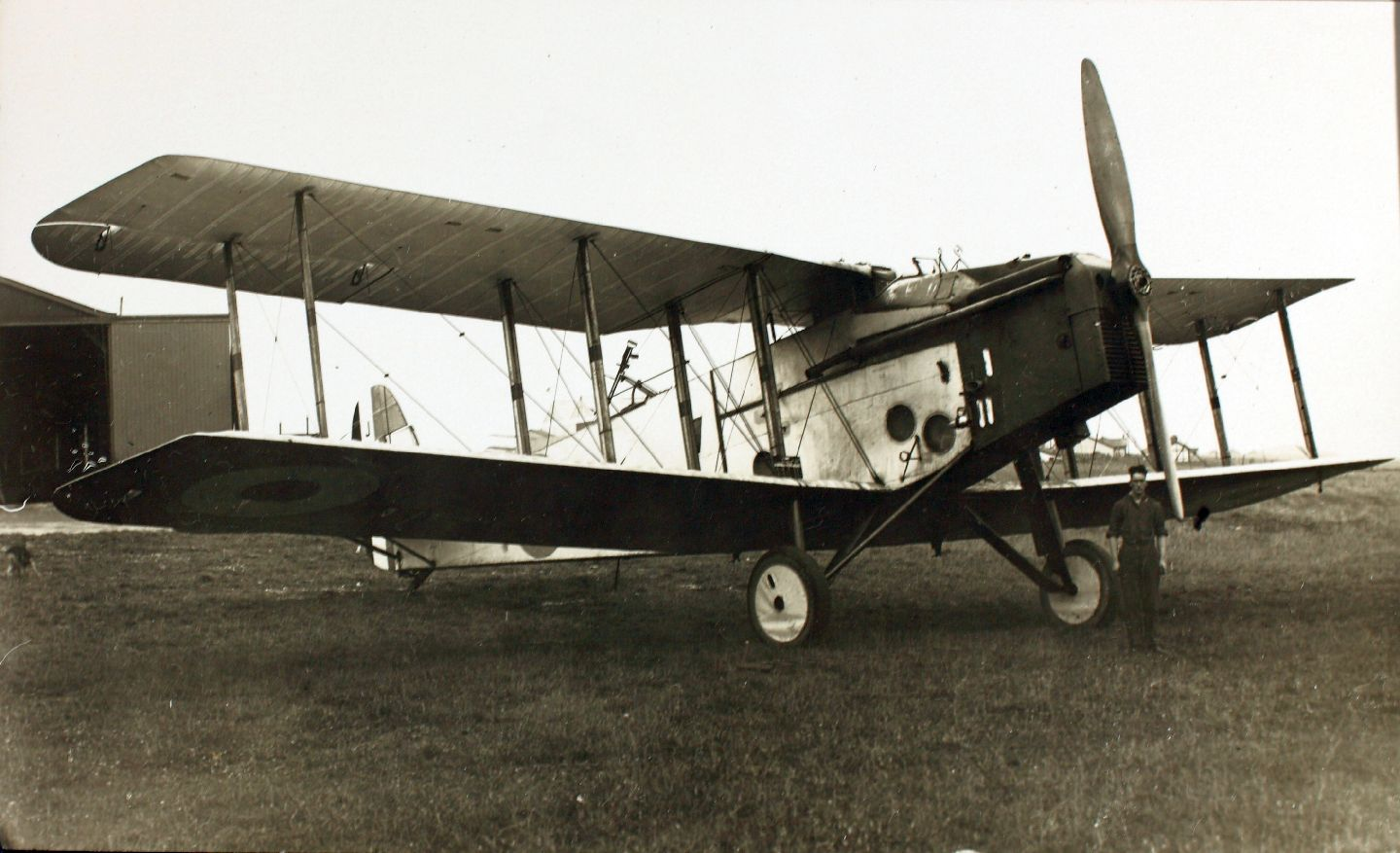

General information
- Type: Bomber
- National origin: United Kingdom
- Manufacturer: The Bristol Aeroplane Co. Ltd
- Designer: W.T.Reid
- Number built: 3

History
- First flight: 5 March 1925

The Bristol Berkeley was built to a British government specification for a single-engine day or night bomber. Three of these two-seat biplanes were built, but no contract for further production was awarded.

== Development ==
In August 1923, British aircraft manufacturers were invited to submit designs to Air Ministry Specification 26/23, which called for a single Rolls-Royce Condor-engined two-seat day or night bomber. The Berkeley was Bristol's response, designed largely by W.T. Reid with finishing touches from Bristol's longtime chief designer, Frank Barnwell. It was a fabric-covered all-metal structured three-bay biplane, with equal span, unswept and unstaggered wings with Frise-type ailerons on the upper and lower planes. Structurally, the wings were of rolled steel and duralumin.

The fuselage was built from steel tubes and had a rectangular cross section. The pilot sat forward of the leading edge of the wing in an open cockpit and the gunner/observer in a cockpit well aft, fitted with a ring-mounted .303 in (7.7 mm) Lewis Gun. He could also access a bomb aimer's position, when he lay prone on the aircraft floor. The horizontal tail was positioned at the top of the fuselage and braced below, carrying elevators whose balances protruded beyond the fixed surfaces. The rudder was tall and also horn-balanced, but more elegantly than the elevators with the edge running smoothly into the fin. The undercarriage was of wide track, mounted to the wings below the centre section interplane struts and braced to the fuselage.

The 650 hp (490 kW) Condor engine drove a two-blade propeller and had, after some Air Ministry input, a nose-mounted radiator under the propeller shaft. The Ministry advised that the wings of the first two Berkeleys of the three specified in the contract should have wooden wings for speed of completion, with the third to be all metal. Leitner-Watts Metal airscrews were required for the second and third machine. The first Berkeley flew on 5 March 1925.

The Type 90 Berkeley was the first Bristol aircraft to receive a type number at the start of its design rather than retrospectively.

== Operational history ==
The first Berkeley was accepted for trials at RAF Martlesham Heath in May 1925 and remained there until November. Other aircraft competing for production contracts were the Handley Page Handcross, the Hawker Horsley and the Westland Yeovil. The Handcross and the Berkeley were the two larger machines and for that reason judged more suitable for the night bombing role; unfortunately for Handley-Page and Bristol, the Air Ministry had already decided, on the basis of experience with the Avro Aldershot that single-engine aircraft were not suitable for night-bombing. In the end, therefore the only successful contender was the Horsley, chosen for the day-bomber role.

The second Berkeley was accepted by the Air Ministry in December 1925 and the all-metal third one in the following June. All three went to the Royal Aircraft Establishment (RAE) for experimental flight. The second aircraft undertook comparative trials of a four-blade wooden airscrew against its original two-blade steel one. One of the three Berkeleys was still flying with the RAE at the end of 1930.

== Specifications ==
Data from Barnes 1964, p. 188

General characteristics

- Crew: two
- Length: 47 ft 6 in (14.048 m)
- Wingspan: 57 ft 11 in (17.65 m)
- Height: 14 ft 0 in (4.27 m)
- Wing area: 985 sq ft (91.5 m^{2})
- Empty weight: 5,200 lb (2,360 kg)
- Gross weight: 8,128 lb (4,140 kg)
- Powerplant: 1 × Rolls-Royce Condor III water-cooled V-12 , 650 hp (485 kW)

Performance

- Maximum speed: 120 mph (193 km/h, 100 kn)
- Endurance: 12 hours

Armament

- 1 × 0.303 in (7.7 mm) Lewis gun in rear cockpit
- 500 lb (227 kg) bomb load
