= Hawker Horsley =

Bomber aircraft family by Hawker

Horsley
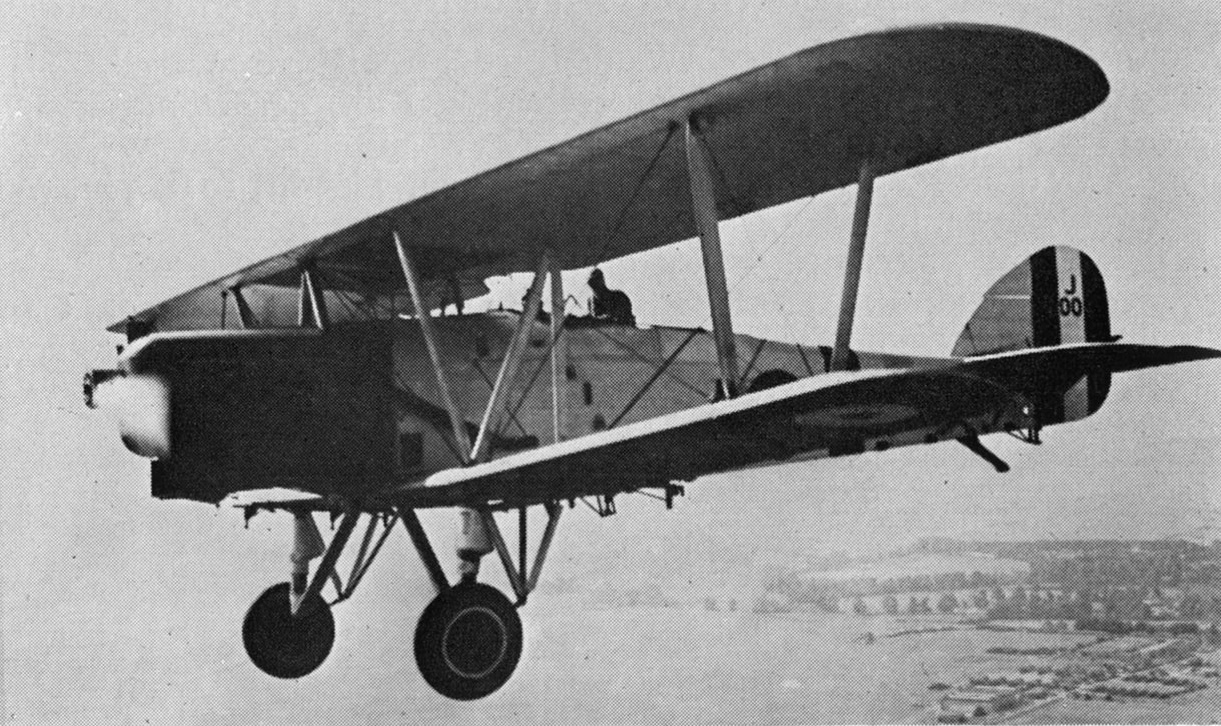
- A Hawker Horsley of No. 100 Squadron, RAF

General information
- Type: Medium bomber
- Manufacturer: Hawker Aircraft
- Primary user: RAF
- Number built: 124

History
- Introduction date: January 1927
- First flight: 1925
- Retired: 1935
- Variant: Hawker Dantorp

The Hawker Horsley was a British single-engined biplane bomber of the 1920s. It was the last all-wooden aircraft built by Hawker Aircraft, and served as a medium day bomber and torpedo bomber with Britain's Royal Air Force between 1926 and 1935, as well as the navies of Greece and Denmark.

== Design and development ==
The Horsley (named after Sir Thomas Sopwith's home of Horsley Towers) was originally designed to meet Air Ministry Specification 26/23 for a day bomber powered by a single Rolls-Royce Condor engine. While the specification called for any production aircraft to be of metal construction, Hawker proposed to build the prototype of wooden construction, gradually switching to a metal structure during production. This was acceptable to the Air Ministry, and an order for a single prototype was placed. The first prototype was first flown at Brooklands in March 1925, powered by a 650 hp (480 kW) engine, and was delivered to the Aeroplane and Armament Experimental Establishment at Martlesham Heath on 4 May 1925.

Meanwhile, the Air Ministry revised its requirements, producing Specification 23/25 which increased the required payload from one to two 550 lb (250 kg) bombs. At the same time, it also issued Specification 24/25 for a torpedo bomber, required to carry a 2,150 lb (980 kg) torpedo. The Horsley's ability to cope with the increased loads required to meet these new specifications led to the design being favoured by the RAF, with an initial order of forty aircraft, consisting of ten wooden Mk Is and 30 Mk IIs of mixed metal and wood construction, being placed.

== Description ==
The Horsley was a large single-engined two-bay biplane. It had a crew of two, comprising a pilot and a gunner/bomb-aimer/radio operator, who had a .303 in (7.7 mm) Lewis gun mounted in a Scarff ring in the rear cockpit and a prone position for bomb aiming. The rear cockpit was also fitted with dual controls. The payload included two 550 lb (250 kg) bombs, one 1,500 lb (680 kg) bomb or a torpedo weighing 2,800 lb (1,300 kg).

The structure was originally all wood, but before production was complete an all-metal structure was introduced, made in what became the famous Hawker system of metal construction. The three methods of construction were designated: Horsley Mk I for the all-wooden aircraft, Horsley Mk II for the mixed material, and (unofficially) Horsley III for the all-metal aircraft. Some aircraft were fitted with floats.

Two aircraft, known as the Hawker Dantorp and powered by Leopard II engines were sold to the Danish Government. They had a slightly different fuselage, accommodating a third crew member. The Danes also purchased a licence to build a further ten aircraft at the Danish Naval Workshops (Orlogsvaerftet), but these were not built owing to a shortage of funds.

Production aircraft were powered by the Condor IIIA, but the Horsley was also much used as a flying testbed for other engines, including the Napier Lion, Rolls-Royce Buzzard, Rolls-Royce Eagle, the Armstrong Siddeley Leopard radial engine, the Junkers Jumo diesel engine and early versions of the Rolls-Royce Merlin.

== Operational history ==
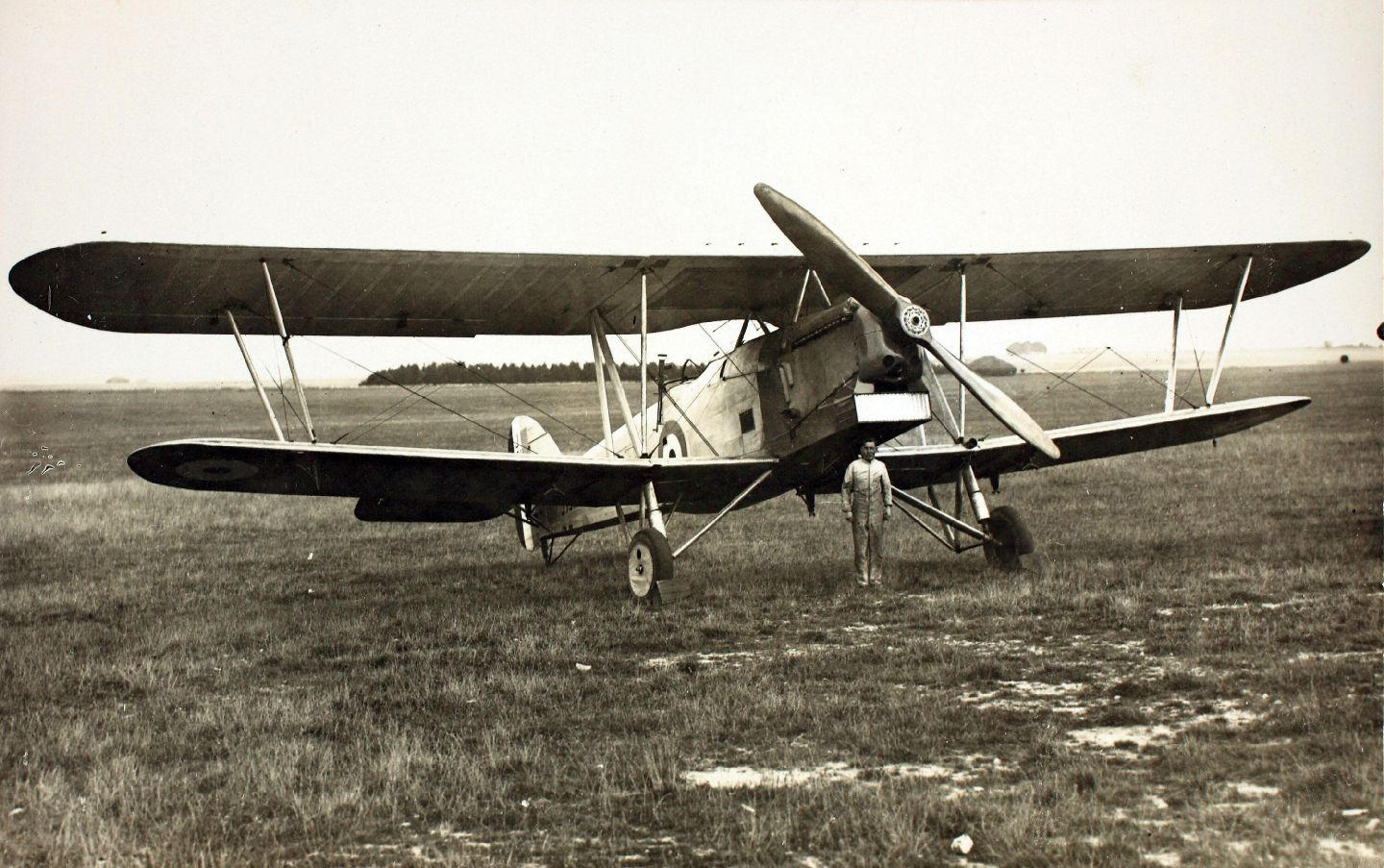
Hawker Horsley bomber

The first aircraft were delivered to No 100 (Bomber) Squadron of the Royal Air Force at Donibristle, Fife, in September 1927, with two more squadrons, No. 15 and No. 11 Squadrons receiving Horsleys by the end of the year, replacing the Fairey Fawn. The Horsleys proved greatly superior to the Fawn, carrying up to three times the bomb load over greater ranges and at higher speeds, while also being agile for their size, and were popular with their pilots.

In October 1928, No. 36 Squadron formed at Donibristle, Fife, Scotland, as a torpedo-bomber squadron. It was transferred to Singapore in 1930, helping to suppress a rebellion in Burma as well as maintaining its torpedo bombing skills. 100 Squadron converted to the torpedo bombing role in 1930 to fill the gap in home-based defences.

The Horsley was chosen to attempt a non-stop flight to India, with a specially modified aircraft, carrying much more fuel and taking off at a weight of over 14,000 lb (6,350 kg) took off from RAF Cranwell on 20 May 1927, flown by Flight Lieutenants Roderick Carr and L.E.M Gillman. It ran out of fuel en route, however, ditching in the Persian Gulf near Bandar Abbas, Iran. Despite this it had covered a distance of 3,420 mi (5,500 km; 2,970 nmi), which was sufficient to set a new world distance record, but was beaten in turn within a few hours by Charles Lindbergh, whose solo Atlantic flight between New York and Paris in the Spirit of St. Louis covered 3,590 mi (5,780 km; 3,120 nmi)).

The Horsleys remained in service in the day-bombing role until 1934, with 504 Squadron's Horsleys being replaced by Westland Wallaces at RAF Hucknall in March 1934. No 36 Squadron at Singapore retained the Horsely in the Torpedo bomber role until July 1935. The last Horsley, a Merlin-powered testbed flew its final flight at RAE Farnborough on 7 March 1938.

In total, 124 Horsleys were built, including six aircraft for the Hellenic Naval Air Service and the two related Dantorps built for Denmark.

== Operators ==
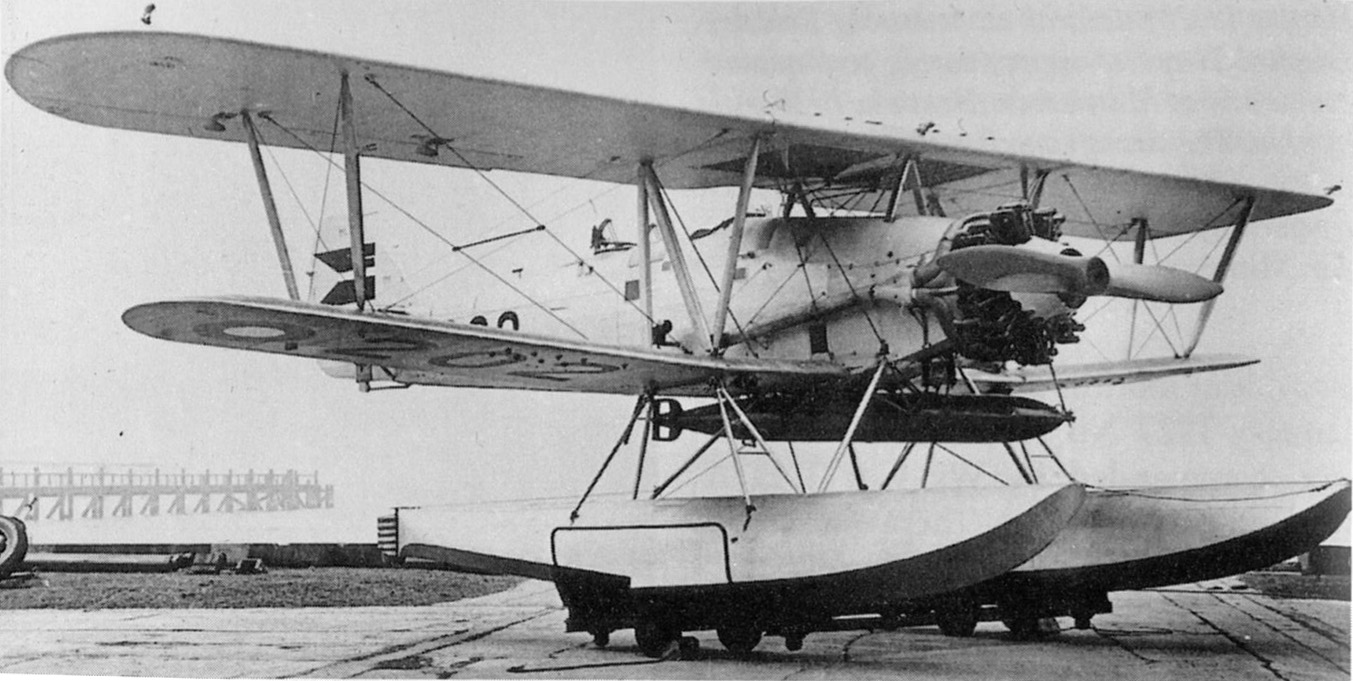
Hawker Dantorp

Denmark

- Marinens Flyvevæsen

Greece

- Hellenic Air Force
- Hellenic Naval Air Service

United Kingdom

- Royal Air Force
  - No. 11 Squadron RAF
  - No. 15 Squadron RAF
  - No. 25 Squadron RAF
  - No. 33 Squadron RAF
  - No. 36 Squadron RAF
  - No. 100 Squadron RAF
  - No. 504 Squadron RAF
  - No. 1 Flying Training School RAF
  - Royal Air Force College Cranwell
  - Anti-Aircraft Cooperation Flight

== Specification (Horsley II day bomber) ==
Data from Hawker Aircraft since 1919

General characteristics

- Crew: 2, pilot and bomb-aimer/gunner
- Length: 38 ft 10 in (11.84 m)
- Wingspan: 56 ft 5 3/4 in (17.21 m)
- Height: 13 ft 8 in (4.17 m)
- Wing area: 693 sq ft (64.4 m^{2})
- Empty weight: 4,760 lb (2,159 kg) (4,958 lb (2,249 kg) for torpedo bomber)
- Gross weight: 7,800 lb (3,538 kg) (9,270 lb (4,200 kg) for torpedo bomber)
- Fuel capacity: 230 imp gal (280 US gal; 1,000 L)
- Powerplant: 1 × Rolls-Royce Condor IIIA water-cooled V12 engine, 665 hp (496 kW)
- Propellers: 2-bladed Watts wooden propeller, 14 ft 6 in (4.42 m) diameter

Performance

- Maximum speed: 125 mph (201 km/h, 109 kn) at 6,000 ft (1,800 m)
- Range: 900 mi (1,400 km, 780 nmi)
- Endurance: approx. 10 hr
- Service ceiling: 14,000 ft (4,300 m)
- Time to altitude: 14 min 20 s to 10,000 ft (3,000 m)

Armament

- Guns:
  - 1 × forward-firing .303 in (7.7 mm) Vickers machine gun
  - 1 × rear-mounted .303 in (7.7 mm) Lewis Gun
- Bombs: 1,500 lb (680 kg) bombload or 1 × torpedo

== See also ==
Related development

- Hawker Dantorp

Aircraft of comparable role, configuration, and era

- Bristol Berkeley
- Handley Page HP.28 Handcross
- Westland Yeovil

Related lists

- List of aircraft of the Royal Air Force
- List of aircraft of World War II
