= Fairey Fremantle =

Fremantle

General information
- Type: reconnaissance seaplane
- National origin: United Kingdom
- Manufacturer: Fairey Aviation Company
- Number built: 1

History
- First flight: 28 November 1924

The Fairey Fremantle was a large single-engine biplane seaplane designed in the mid-1920s for a proposed around-the-world flight. Only one was built.

== Design and development ==
The Fremantle was designed to Air Ministry specification 44/22 calling for a single long-range reconnaissance aircraft. One of several contracts aimed at keeping British design teams together in difficult economic times, it was hoped to produce an aircraft that might achieve the first around-the-world flight. It was a large (almost 70 ft/21 m span) two-bay unstaggered biplane. The fuselage was rectangular and deep, with a two-windowed section for the cabin, built of mahogany planking over a wooden frame in small-boat fashion to avoid the need for internal bracing. The fuselage was deep enough to allow the crew to stand in the cabin, which contained provisions, storage, bunks and navigator's table. The navigator also had a position for celestial observation at the rear of the cabin. The pilot's open cockpit was at the trailing edge of the wing, in front of the cabin.

In front of the pilot was the engine firewall and the metal-covered engine bay housing a 650 hp (490 kW) Rolls-Royce Condor III water-cooled motor. This drove a fixed-pitch wooden propeller via a spur reduction gear which conveniently raised the propeller shaft high on the nose. This arrangement had at least two advantages: for a given propeller diameter, the height of the fuselage above the water was reduced, shortening the length and weight of the float struts; the underside of the nose could be swept up to the base of the radiator for better aerodynamics.

The two mahogany-planked floats were short, so that at rest the Fremantle sat on the water like a tailwheel-type landplane with the assistance of a tail float fixed to the fuselage underside. The tailplane was mounted at the top of the fuselage with bracing underneath and the rudder hinge post carried a water-rudder for directional control at low speeds on the surface. Since the main floats were not widely spaced, there were two more floats attached to the underside of the lower wing immediately below the outer pairs of interplane struts to provide lateral stability. Fuel was stored in tanks in the floats but there was another large and very conspicuous tank mounted centrally above the upper wing. This gravity-fed the engine and was replenished by pumping (hand- or wind-powered) fuel from the float tanks.

== Operational history ==
The Fremantle's first flight was on 28 November 1924, with Norman Macmillan at the controls. Macmillan flew it throughout its flying programme, which lasted until the following June. He reported that it was a pleasant aircraft in the air and on water, though there were some control modifications made during the flying programme. It left the water under full load even with flat sea conditions; on its last flight it carried seven passengers. During this period, the lone Fremantle carried the RAF serial N173 and the civil registration, for the proposed around-the-world flight, G-EBLZ. No such attempt was made, as three Douglas aircraft had already performed this feat in September 1924, two months before the Fremantle flew. It flew with the Royal Aircraft Establishment on radio navigation development during 1926.

== Specifications ==
Data from Taylor 1974, p. 129

General characteristics

- Crew: five
- Length: 53 ft 0 in (16.15 m)
- Wingspan: 69 ft 2 in (21.08 m)
- Height: 20 ft 3 in (6.17 m)
- Wing area: 1,095 sq ft (101.8 m^{2})
- Gross weight: 12,550 lb (5,692 kg)
- Powerplant: 1 × Rolls Royce Condor III upright V-12 watercooled , 650 hp (486 kW)

Performance

- Maximum speed: 108 mph (174 km/h, 94 kn)
- Range: 1,000 mi (1,610 km, 870 nmi)
- Rate of climb: 200 ft/min (1.02 m/s) to 5,000 ft (1,525 m)

== See also ==
Related lists

- List of flying boats and floatplanes
