= De Havilland Highclere =

Highclere
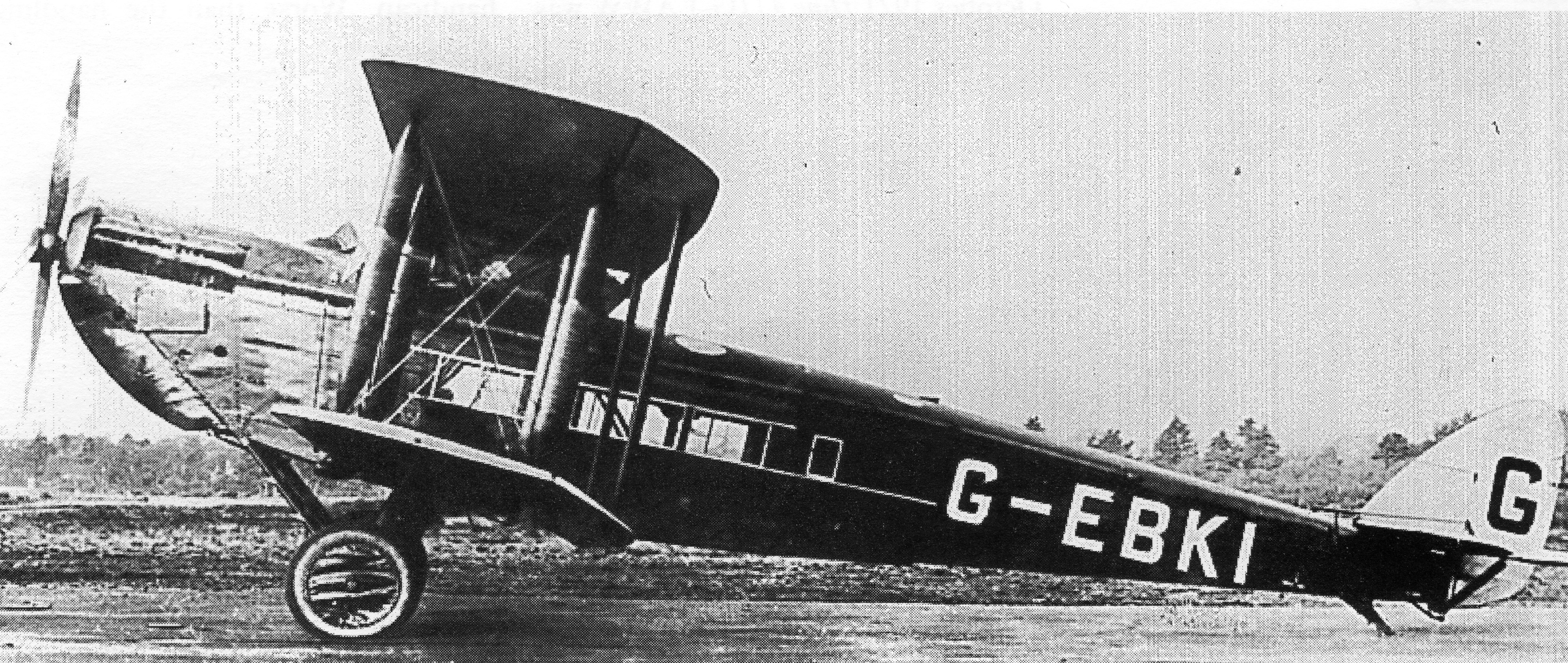

General information
- Type: Airliner
- National origin: United Kingdom
- Manufacturer: de Havilland Aircraft Co. Ltd.
- Number built: 1

History
- First flight: 18 June 1925
- Retired: 1927

The de Havilland DH.54 Highclere was a single-engined 15-passenger biplane airliner designed to replace the DH.34. Its development ended when Imperial Airways decided to use only multi-engined types.

== Development ==
The DH.54 Highclere was designed to Air Ministry specification 40/22 for a larger version of the very successful DH.34 and the two aircraft had much in common, both in construction and general layout. Compared with the DH.34, the Highclere's passenger complement increased from nine to twelve, its all-up weight by 56% and its wing area by 70%. They were both single-engined two-bay biplanes with fabric-covered wooden wings and with wooden-framed fuselages covered with thin plywood.

Size apart, the wings of the Highclere differed in having no stagger, no upper wing dihedral and in having a larger inter-wing gap, the upper wing now attached to the fuselage by cabane struts rather than directly to the upper fuselage. In response to criticism of the DH.34's high landing speed, full-span flaps were fitted. To reduce the hazards of ditching, the undercarriage could be jettisoned and the fuselage was made watertight. Passengers sat in four rows of seats, singles on the left and doubles on the right. A rearrangement of luggage space allowed room for toilets. The Highclere had balanced elevators. The weight increase required an increase in power, so the Highclere used a 650 hp (485 kW) Rolls-Royce Condor IIIA water-cooled inline engine which lengthened the nose and drove a four-bladed propeller of 14 ft (4.27 m) diameter.

== Operational history ==
The Highclere was first flown by H.S. Broad on 18 June 1925 and was soon carrying non-paying passengers and winning races. Owned by the Air Ministry throughout its life, it went to RAF Martlesham Heath for successful airworthiness tests early in 1926, with the Certificate of Airworthiness awarded on 23 April 1926. By then, though Imperial Airways had decided no longer to transport passengers in single-engined types for safety reasons and the sole Highclere was transferred to RAE Farnborough on 7 March 1926 for experimental work. On 7 November 1926 it was loaned to Imperial Airways at Croydon Airport as a freighter and some thought was given to modifications to make the Highclere better fitted to this role, but it was destroyed when a hangar collapsed in heavy snow at Croydon on 1 February 1927.

== Unbuilt variants ==
DH.55
Unbuilt design for 12-seat transport powered by three 120 hp (90 kW) Airdisco engines.
DH.57
Unbuilt derivative of DH.55 with three 230 hp (172 kW) Siddeley Puma engines.

== Specifications ==
Data from Jackson 1978, pp. 212

General characteristics

- Crew: two
- Capacity: twelve
- Length: 51 ft 0 in (15.54 m)
- Wingspan: 68 ft 2 in (20.78 m)
- Height: 15 ft 2.5 in (4.64 m)
- Wing area: 1,004 sq ft (93.27 m^{2})
- Empty weight: 6,768 lb (3,070 kg)
- Gross weight: 11,250 lb (5,103 kg)
- Powerplant: 1 × Rolls-Royce Condor IIIA , 650 hp (485 kW)

Performance

- Maximum speed: 110 mph (177 km/h, 96 kn)
- Cruise speed: 100 mph (161 km/h, 87 kn)
- Range: 400 mi (644 km, 350 nmi)
- Rate of climb: 580 ft/min (2.95 m/s)
