= Bristol Seely =

Seely
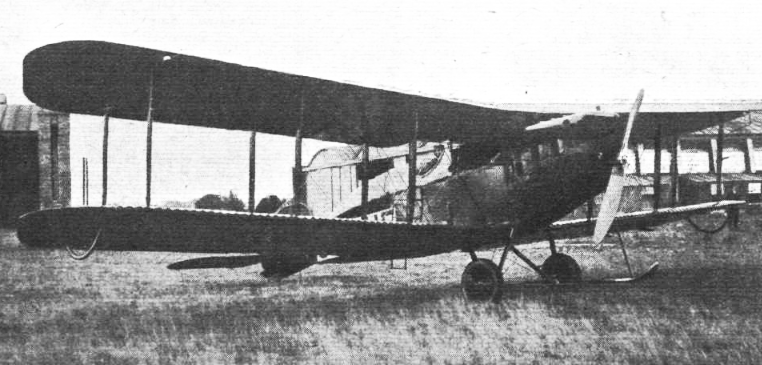

General information
- Type: Airliner
- National origin: United Kingdom
- Manufacturer: Bristol Aeroplane Company
- Number built: 1

History
- First flight: Spring 1920

The Bristol Seely was entered into an Air Ministry competition for safe civil aeroplanes held in 1920. It was a single-engine biplane with accommodation for one passenger. After the competition, the single Seely was used as a testbed for the Bristol Jupiter engine development programme.

== Development ==
The 1920 civil aeroplane competition emphasised safety in terms of a short takeoff and slow landing speed as well as useful load and economy. The rules of the competition were released in July 1919 and Bristol decided that a modification of the Tourer was their best hope. The single passenger was enclosed in a cabin immediately behind the pilot's open cockpit, with a raised roof and windows in the decking where the second seat in the Tourer had been. In addition, the fuselage was deepened by dropping the lower longerons and floor to the lower wing spar. Ahead of the pilot, the fuselage bays were built from steel rather than wood spars. The single-axle main undercarriage carried wheels with disc brakes; there was a central skid to prevent nosing over and fenders under the wingtips. The tailskid was steerable and sprung.

The Seely was a three-bay biplane with greater wing area than the Tourer, with ailerons on both upper and lower wings. The rudder was horn-balanced and the fin area generous. For the competition, it was powered by a water-cooled upright inline 240 hp (180 kW) Siddeley Puma with a large nose radiator behind the wooden two-blade propeller.

There were only two other aircraft in the competition, held at RAF Martlesham Heath in August 1920, the Westland Limousine and the Sopwith Antelope. In the end, the Westland was the winner.

After the competition, Bristol retained the Seely for general duties until 1923, when it was converted into a testbed for Jupiter development, being purchased by the Air Ministry for use with the Royal Aircraft Establishment. It was fitted with a 435 hp (324 kW) Jupiter III nine-cylinder radial engine driving a steel two-bladed Leitner-Watts propeller. The Jupiter had an exhaust-driven supercharger to enhance high-altitude performance, raising the Seely's service ceiling from 18,000 ft (5,490 m) with the Puma to 24,000 ft (8,230 m). At these altitudes, the enclosed cabin provided the observer with welcome relief from the elements.

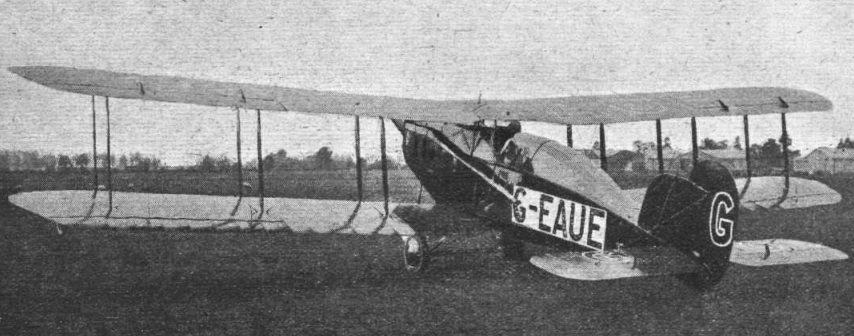

== The name ==
Seely is not a common English word, nor does it seem to be a place name. The Oxford English Dictionary has an entry for it marked as obsolete, except in dialect: like many words it lost its positive meanings as time went by, but in Early English (c.1200) it could mean either punctual, or fortunate /blessed. These are desirable characteristics of an airliner, though it is not known if Bristol had this in mind.

Alternatively, the name may be in honour of Jack Seely who was Secretary of State for War from June 1912 to March 1914. He is credited with a keen interest in the infant Royal Flying Corps, founded in May 1912.

== Specifications (Puma) ==
Data from Barnes 1970, p. 155

General characteristics

- Crew: one
- Capacity: one
- Length: 29 ft 6 in (8.99 m)
- Wingspan: 47 ft 3 in (14.4 m)
- Height: 12 ft 0 in (3.66 m)
- Wing area: 566 sq ft (52.6 m^{2})
- Empty weight: 2,000 lb (907 kg)
- Gross weight: 3,000 lb (1,360 kg)
- Powerplant: 1 × Siddeley Puma six-cylinder upright in-line water-cooled , 240 hp (180 kW)

Performance

- Maximum speed: 110 mph (177 km/h, 96 kn) at sea level
- Service ceiling: 18,000 ft (5,485 m)
