= Armstrong Siddeley Leopard =

1920s British piston aircraft engine

Leopard
- Type: Radial engine
- National origin: United Kingdom
- Manufacturer: Armstrong Siddeley
- First run: 1927

The Armstrong Siddeley Leopard was a British 14-cylinder twin-row air-cooled radial aero engine developed in 1927 by Armstrong Siddeley. It was the most powerful radial engine in the world when introduced.

== Variants ==
Leopard I
700 hp, medium supercharged. Direct drive propeller.
Leopard II
700 hp, geared epicyclic drive.
Leopard III
800 hp, two-valve cylinder head, direct drive.
Leopard IIIA
800 hp, geared epicyclic drive.

== Applications ==
- Blackburn Iris
- Junkers Ju 52
- Hawker Dantorp
- Hawker Horsley

== Specifications (Leopard I) ==
Data from Lumsden, 2003.

=== General characteristics ===
- Type: 14-cylinder twin-row air-cooled radial engine
- Bore: 6.0 in (152.4 mm)
- Stroke: 7.5 in (190.5 mm)
- Displacement: 2,970 cu in (48.6 L)
- Length: 60.85 in (1546 mm)
- Diameter: 58 in (1473 mm)
- Dry weight: 1,466 lb (665 kg)

=== Components ===
- Valvetrain: Overhead valve, four valves per cylinder
- Fuel type: Petrol
- Cooling system: Air-cooled

=== Performance ===
- Power output: 700 hp (522 kW) at 1,650 rpm at sea level
- Compression ratio: 5.00:1
- Fuel consumption: 45 gal/hr (169 L/hr) at cruise speed
- Power-to-weight ratio: 0.47 hp/lb

== See also ==
Comparable engines

- Wright R-2600

Related lists

- List of aircraft engines
