= De Havilland DH.27 Derby =

Large single-engined biplane

DH.27 Derby
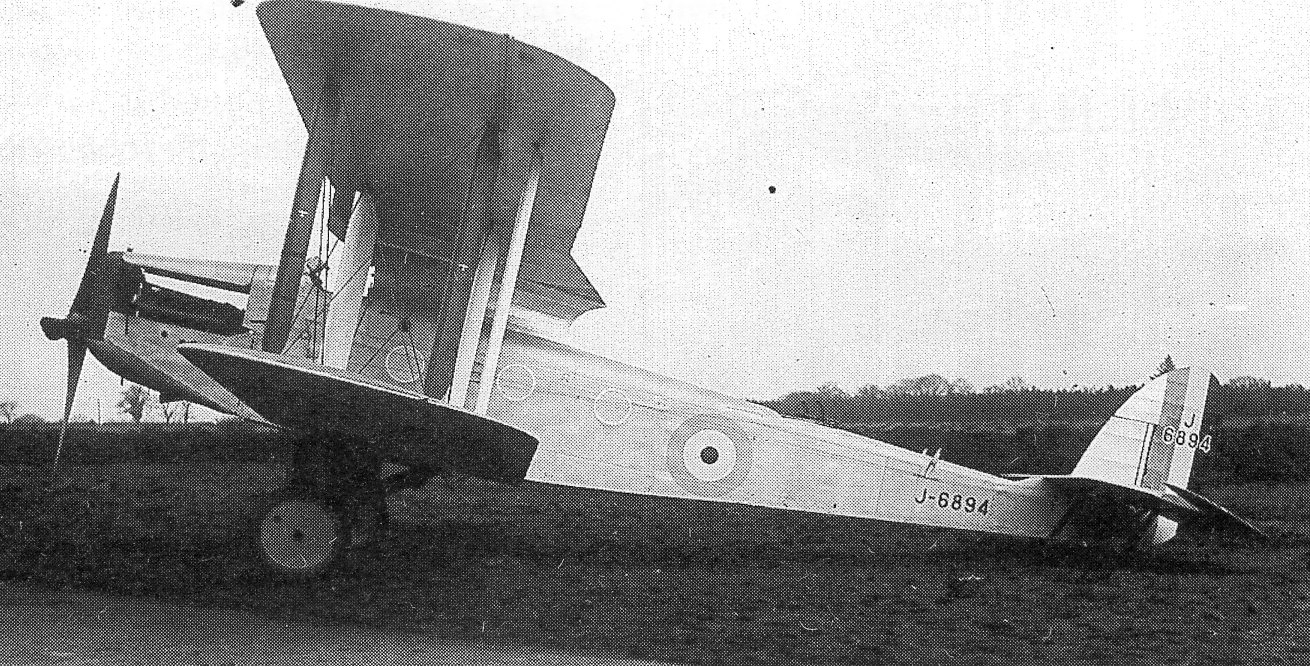

General information
- Type: Heavy bomber
- National origin: United Kingdom
- Manufacturer: de Havilland Aircraft Co. Ltd
- Status: abandoned prototype
- Number built: 2

History
- First flight: 13 October 1922
- Retired: 1924

The de Havilland DH.27 Derby was a large single-engined biplane designed to a heavy day bomber Air Ministry specification. It did not reach production.

== Development ==
The de Havilland DH.27 Derby was designed to meet Air Ministry specification 2/20 for a long-range heavy bomber. It was a large, single-engined two-bay biplane without sweep or stagger. The upper and lower wings were fabric-covered wooden structures, both carrying ailerons and capable of folding outside the inner interplane struts. Apart from the upper centre section, the wings were of constant chord; this section was thickened, of greater chord and attached to the fuselage not by the usual centre section (cabane) struts but by a long streamlined pylon, which also contained the fuel tanks. The undercarriage was a split-axle design to allow a bomb to be released from under the fuselage. The main legs were mounted on the front spar under the inner interplane struts, with long axles sloped slightly upwards, the inner ends of which were braced back to the top of the leg and, separately, to the fuselage.

The fuselage followed developing standard de Havilland practice, with spruce longerons cross-braced and covered in thin plywood. The rudder and elevators were balanced and the fin and rudder had the familiar de Havilland shape. The pilot sat directly below the leading edge of the wing and there was a dorsal observer/gunner's position. Within the fuselage between them, and with three portholes each side, was a cabin for the navigator/bomb aimer. The water-cooled 650 hp (485 kW) Rolls-Royce Condor III had a rectangular nose-mounted radiator, and drove a four-bladed propeller.

Two prototype aircraft were built, the first flying on 13 October 1922. The Air Ministry preferred the Avro Aldershot over the Derby, with the all-wood Derby considerably heavier than the mixed-construction Aldershot while, unlike the Aldershot, the Derby had no provision to carry its bombload internally, so no production followed. The two prototypes were based at RAF Martlesham Heath and the Naval station on the Isle of Grain until about 1924, and used for general duties and tests.

== Specifications ==
Data from

General characteristics

- Crew: Three
- Length: 47 ft 4 in (14.43 m)
- Wingspan: 64 ft 6 in (19.66 m)
- Width: 30 ft 0 in (9.14 m) (wings folded)
- Height: 16 ft 10 in (5.13 m)
- Wing area: 1,120 sq ft (104 m^{2})
- Empty weight: 6,737 lb (3,056 kg)
- Gross weight: 11,545 lb (5,237 kg)
- Powerplant: 1 × Rolls-Royce Condor III water-cooled V12 engine, 650 hp (480 kW)
- Propellers: 4-bladed wood fixed pitch propeller

Performance

- Maximum speed: 105 mph (169 km/h, 91 kn)
- Range: 550 mi (890 km, 480 nmi)
- Service ceiling: 12,800 ft (3,900 m)

Armament

- Guns: 1× 0.303 in (7.7 mm) Lewis gun mounted on Scarff ring in dorsal cockpit
- Bombs: Up to 4× 550 lb (250 kg) bombs carried externally

== See also ==
- 1922 in aviation

Aircraft of comparable role, configuration, and era

- Avro Aldershot

Related lists

- List of bomber aircraft
- List of aircraft of the Royal Air Force
