= The Metal Airscrew Company =

- Industry: Aerospace
- Founded: 1919
- Founder: Henry Charles Watts and Henry Leitner
- Successor: Metal Propellers Ltd.
- Headquarters: Regent House, London then 74 Purley Way, Croydon, United Kingdom
- Products: Aircraft propellers

The Metal Airscrew Company was formed in 1919 by Dr. Henry Charles Watts and Henry Leitner to produce hollow metal aircraft propellers with a method set out in their joint patent. By 1928 the company name had changed to Metal Propellers Ltd. It remained active until at least 1930.

== History ==
The Leitner-Watts propellers were amongst the earliest with a thick metal aerodynamic profile. Watts was the aerodynamicist who determined the blade profile, Leitner the engineer who translated it into metal and designed hubs for two, three and four bladed propellers. The blades were produced in the Rubery Owen factory in Darlaston, Staffordshire. Each blade side or shell was made up from three laminations of steel sheet, shaped in a press. The outer layer formed the complete shell shape and the progressively shorter, Y-shaped inner laminations strengthened the bade towards the root. The laminations were riveted or spot-welded together and the two shells welded together at their edges. To stiffen the blade, small shouldered cylindrical struts were then inserted through the face and externally soldered at each end. The hubs allowed easy ground adjustment of pitch to any angle; if one blade was damaged, it could easily be replaced.

These early metal propellers were ground tested at RAE Farnborough then test flown on a Bristol Tourer seaplane. In 1922 they were fitted to the Napier Lion engine of the de Havilland DH.18 airliner.

At an extraordinary general meeting on 28 January 1926 the company decided that it should be wound up voluntarily and they appointed a liquidator. In January 1927 a final general meeting was called to receive the liquidators report and close the company.

Around 1928, the company reformed as Metal Propellers Ltd, with board members who also had positions with Saunders-Roe, Spartan Aircraft Ltd and British Airways. Watts remained as chief designer from 1925-7 but moved to The Airscrew Company in 1932. Metal Propellers continued to advertise until at least December 1930. Metal Propellers Ltd were still sending apprentices to Saunders-Roe on the Isle of Wight for an initial training year in the mid 1950s.

== Applications ==
- Bristol Berkeley
- Bristol Seely
- Bristol Tourer
- de Havilland DH.18
- Handley Page Handcross
- Morane-Saulnier AV
- Westland Yeovil

== See also ==
- List of aircraft propeller manufacturers
