= Napier Cub =

1910s British aircraft piston engine

Cub
- Napier Cub rear view.
- Type: Piston aero engine
- Manufacturer: D. Napier & Son
- First run: 1919
- Major applications: Avro Aldershot; Blackburn Cubaroo
- Number built: 6

The Napier Cub was an unusual and very large experimental 1,000 horsepower (750 kW) 16-cylinder 'X' pattern liquid-cooled aero engine built by the British engine company D. Napier & Son. The Cub was the only Napier 'X' engine design. First flown on 15 December 1922 in an Avro Aldershot biplane bomber aircraft, the only other application was in the Blackburn Cubaroo. Only six engines of this type were ordered and produced.

== Design ==
The four banks of four cylinders were arranged in a flattened 'X' when viewed from the front. The angle between the upper cylinders was 52.5 degrees, the lower cylinders 127.5 degrees, which gave an angle of 90 degrees between the outer cylinder banks. The cylinders consisted of separate individual steel forgings with welded steel water cooling jackets. The carburettor was situated below the propeller reduction gear at the front of the engine and fed the inlet valves through four inlet manifolds. The valve drive gear, magnetos and pumps were fitted to the rear of the crankcase.

== Specifications (Cub) ==
Data from Lumsden

=== General characteristics ===
- Type: 16-cylinder liquid-cooled X engine
- Bore: 6.25 in (158.75 mm)
- Stroke: 7.5 in (190.5 mm)
- Displacement: 3,681 cu in (60.32 L)
- Dry weight: 2,450 lb (1,111 kg)

=== Components ===
- Valvetrain: Single overhead camshaft with four poppet valves per cylinder
- Fuel system: Updraught carburettor
- Fuel type: Petrol
- Cooling system: Liquid cooled
- Reduction gear: Spur geared, reduction ratio 0.489:1, left hand tractor

=== Performance ===
- Power output: 1,000 hp at 1,800 rpm
- Compression ratio: 5.3:1
- Power-to-weight ratio: 0.4 hp/lb

== See also ==
Comparable engines

- Rolls-Royce Eagle XVI

Related lists

- List of aircraft engines
