= Avro 549 Aldershot =

British single-engined heavy bomber aircraft

Aldershot
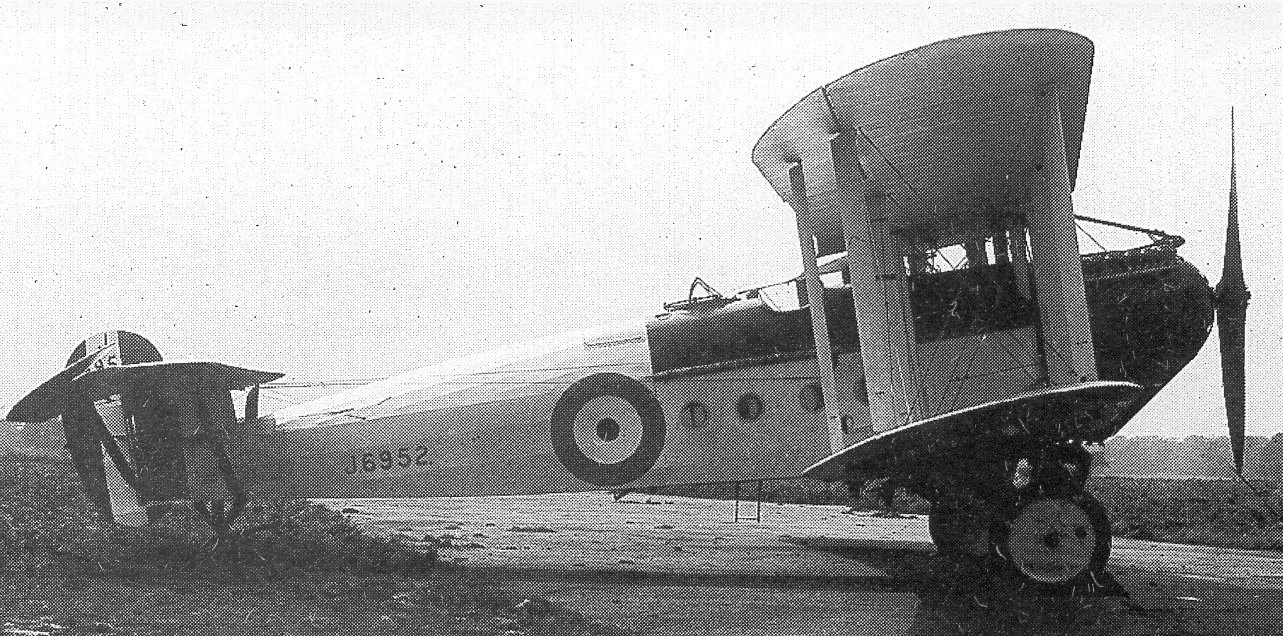
- The first prototype in 1924, modified to production standard

General information
- Type: Heavy Bomber
- Manufacturer: Avro
- Status: Retired
- Primary user: Royal Air Force

History
- Manufactured: 17
- Introduction date: July 1924
- First flight: October 1921
- Retired: March 1926
- Variant: Avro Andover

The Avro 549 Aldershot was a British single-engined heavy bomber aircraft built by Avro.

== Development and design ==
The Aldershot was designed to meet the 1920 British Specification 2/20 for a heavy long-range day and night bomber to be powered by a Rolls-Royce Condor engine. The specification required a range of 500 miles (800 km) and a bombload of 2,000 lb (900 kg), originally comprising a single World War I vintage 1,800 lb (820 kg) SN bomb, but then changed to four 500 lb (230 kg) bombs carried externally or eight 250 lb (114 kg) bombs internally. The Air Ministry gave Avro a contract for two prototypes, designated Aldershot I, on 2 December 1920, in competition with the de Havilland Derby.

The first prototype flew at Hamble Aerodrome near Southampton in October 1921. As a result of test flying, the fuselage was lengthened by 6 ft (2 m) in order to improve directional control, being displayed in this form at the RAF Display at Hendon on 24 June, the second prototype flying in July with the lengthened fuselage and a modified undercarriage.

The first prototype was modified as a testbed for the water-cooled Napier Cub engine, in this form becoming the Aldershot II, flying on 15 December 1922. It was later used to test the slow-revving 850 hp (630 kW) Beardmore Typhoon I inline engine, flying in this form on 10 January 1927.

The Aldershot was a three-bay biplane, with a steel-framed fuselage structure with plywood and fabric covering, and wooden wings. The pilot and navigator were seated side by side in a cockpit behind the upper wing trailing edge, with additional accommodation for the navigator who was also the bomb-aimer, in a cabin inside the fuselage, which was provided with four circular windows on each side. A gunner sat in a separate cockpit behind the pilot, and was armed with a Lewis gun on a Scarff ring. Another Lewis gun could be fitted to a ventral mounting in the cabin, while there was provision for a fixed, forward-firing Vickers machine gun operated by the pilot, although this was rarely fitted. A bomb bay forward of the cabin could hold eight 250 lb (114 kg) bombs, with larger bombs being carried externally under the fuselage.

The Aldershot also formed the basis for the Avro Andover transport, which used the same wings, tail and powerplant but had a new fuselage.

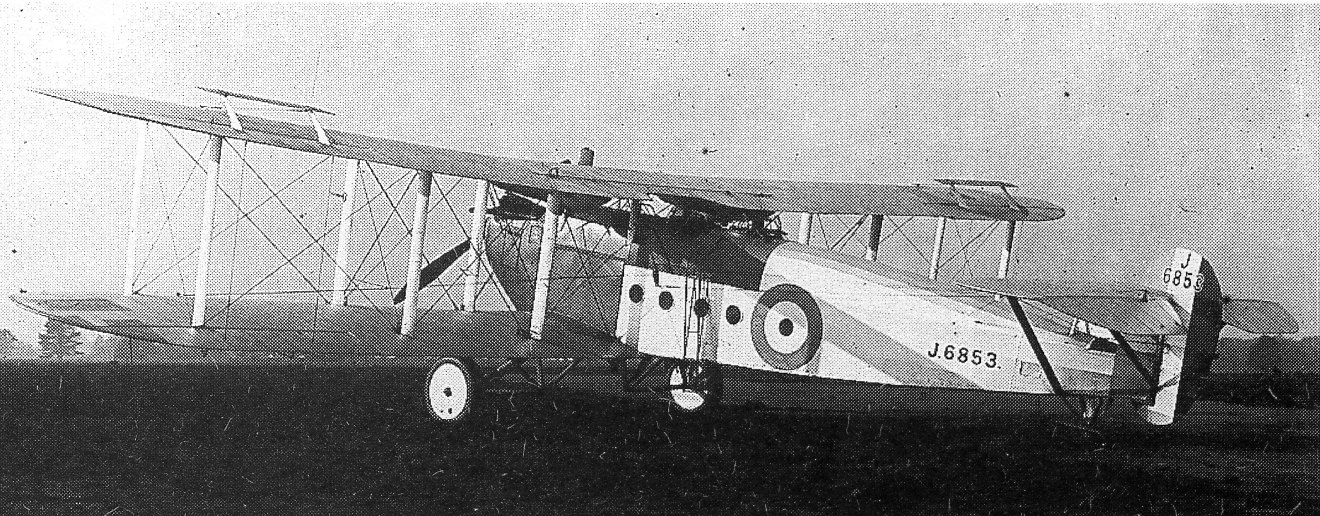
The second prototype in 1922, with modified rear fuselage and empennage but no external aileron links

== Operational history ==
When it was evaluated against the de Havilland Derby, the Aldershot proved to be the superior aircraft, with the mixed-construction Aldershot being about 800 lb (360 kg) lighter than the all-wooden Derby, which had no provision for carrying its bombload internally, or for any ventral armament.

On 26 January 1923, the Air Ministry ordered 15 aircraft under the designation Aldershot III. The only operator of the aircraft was No. 99 Squadron RAF which reformed on 1 April 1924, receiving its Aldershots from July that year. The Aldershot was mainly used for night flying, but occasionally flew day bombing exercises. Unlike the other members of the RAF's heavy bomber force, it was operated in an all-silver colour scheme, rather than the dark-green NIVO scheme usually used for night operations. By 1925, the Air Ministry had decided that heavy bombers should have multiple engines, and 99 Squadron started to receive the twin-engined Handley Page Hyderabad in January 1926, with the Aldershots being completely replaced in Squadron service by March that year.

== Variants ==
Avro 549 Aldershot I
Prototype. Two built.
Avro 549A Aldershot II
First prototype modified with 1,000 hp (746 kW) Napier Cub engine.
Avro 549B Aldershot III
Production version. 15 built. One modified with metal wings as Avro 549M.

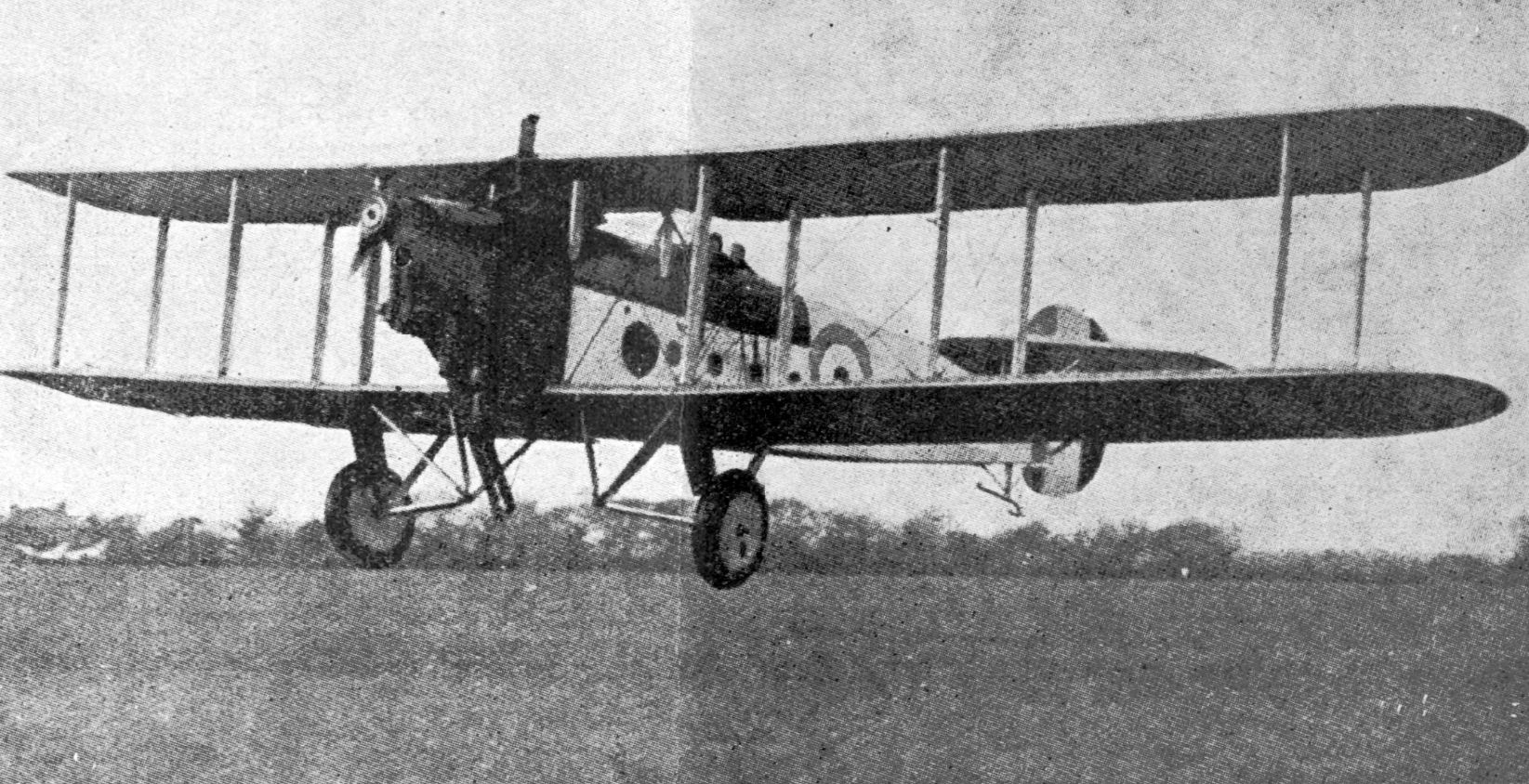
Avro 549C Aldershot IV photo from L'Air February 15, 1927

Avro 549C Aldershot IV
First prototype modified with Beardmore Typhoon engine.

== Operators ==
United Kingdom

- Royal Air Force
  - No. 99 Squadron RAF

== Specifications (Aldershot III) ==
Data from Avro Aircraft since 1908

General characteristics

- Crew: 3
- Length: 45 ft 0 in (13.72 m)
- Wingspan: 68 ft 0 in (20.73 m)
- Height: 15 ft 3 in (4.65 m)
- Wing area: 1,064 sq ft (98.8 m^{2})
- Empty weight: 6,310 lb (2,862 kg)
- Max takeoff weight: 10,950 lb (4,967 kg)
- Powerplant: 1 × Rolls-Royce Condor III V-12 liquid-cooled piston engine, 650 hp (480 kW)
- Propellers: 2-bladed fixed-pitch propeller

Performance

- Maximum speed: 110 mph (180 km/h, 96 kn)
- Cruise speed: 92 mph (148 km/h, 80 kn)
- Range: 625 mi (1,006 km, 543 nmi)
- Service ceiling: 14,500 ft (4,400 m)

Armament

- Guns: 1 × .303 in (7.7 mm) Lewis Gun in rear cockpit, provision for 1 × Lewis gun in ventral position and provision for 1 × forward-firing Vickers machine gun.
- Bombs: up to 2,000 lb (910 kg) of bombs

== See also ==
Aircraft of comparable role, configuration, and era

- de Havilland Derby

Related lists

- List of aircraft of the Royal Air Force
