= Handley Page HP.28 Handcross =

Handcross
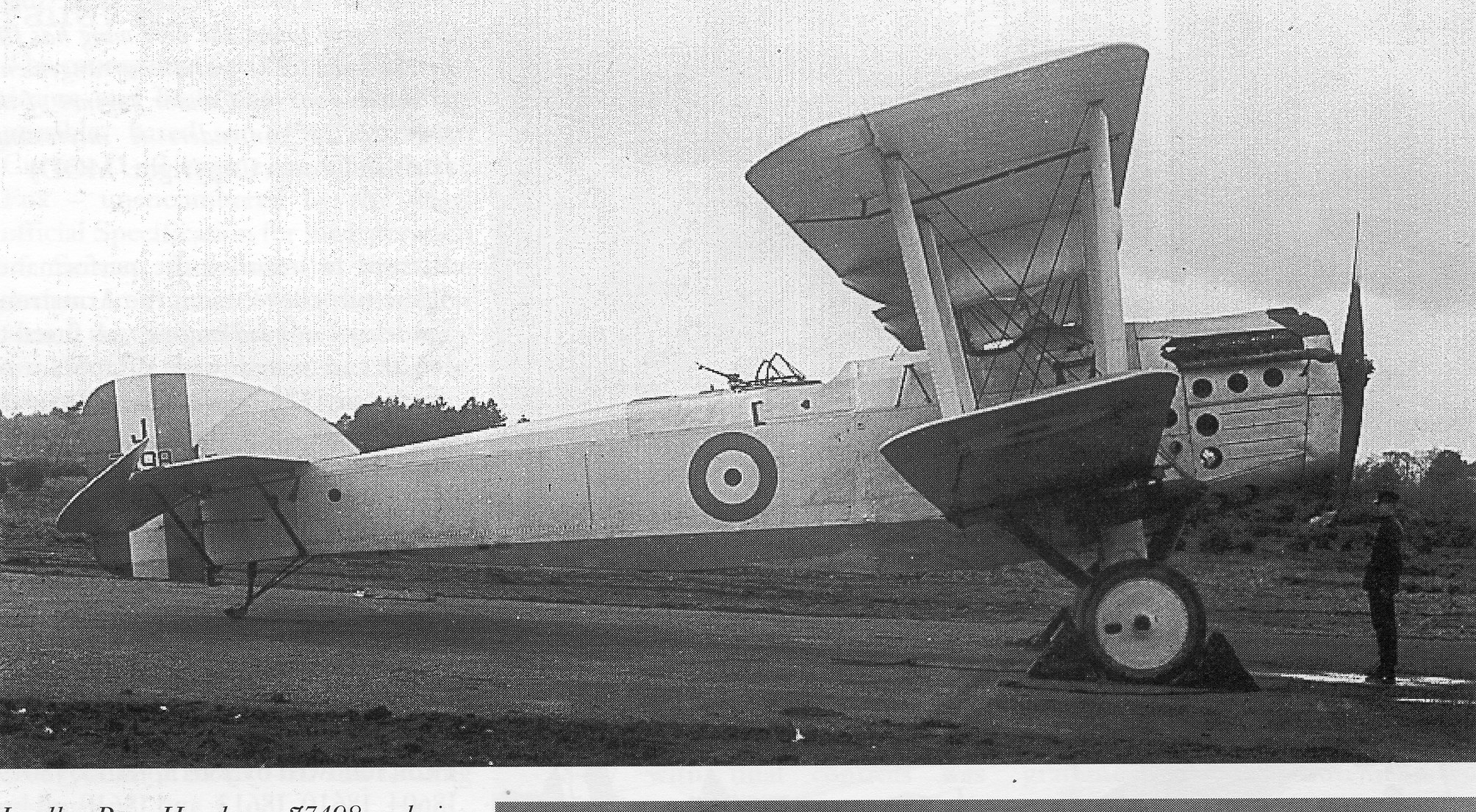

General information
- Type: Day bomber
- National origin: United Kingdom
- Manufacturer: Handley Page
- Number built: 3

History
- First flight: 6 December 1924
- Retired: c.1928

The Handley Page Handcross was a single-engined biplane day bomber built to an Air Ministry specification. It was not put into production and only the three prototypes were built.

== Development ==
In August 1923 the Air Ministry issued specification 26/23, which called for a day bomber powered by a Rolls-Royce Condor III engine which could carry a 550 lb (250 kg) bomb load with a 500-mile (800 km) range. In response, Handley Page designed what was known at the time as the C/7 Handcross but retrospectively became the H.P.28 Handcross after the introduction of the familiar H.P. type numbers in about 1927.

The Handcross was constructed from wood and fabric throughout. It was a three-bay biplane with equal-span wings without stagger or sweep. The wings had parallel chord but the lower planes were significantly narrower than the upper; only the lower planes carried dihedral. Ailerons, with back-set hinges to provide aerodynamic balance, were mounted on the upper planes alone. The wide-track divided main undercarriage had legs mounted on the wing front spar below the innermost interplane struts, braced to the fuselage. The fuselage was flat sided with a pronounced dorsal fairing or decking and a similar ventral fairing below. The pilot sat in an open cockpit below the upper wing, with the gunner in a dorsal position behind him. The gunner could also access two spaces in the belly: a prone position below the pilot for bomb aiming, or a rearward-firing gun position behind this. The tail surfaces were conventional, rudder and elevators being horn-balanced; the rudder reached down below the fuselage bottom, protected by a small tailskid. The V-12 watercooled Condor engine was cooled by a radiator in the nose below the boss of the two bladed metal Leitner-Watts propeller.

Handley Page were awarded an order for three prototypes and the first of these flew at the company's Cricklewood base on 6 December 1924, piloted by Hubert Broad. After test flights there it went to RAF Martlesham Heath on 1 January 1925 for Air Ministry tests and eventually in June for competitive trials against other manufacturers' entrants. Meanwhile, the other two machines had been completed, the second going to RAE Farnborough for use in an experimental radio programme and the third retained at Cricklewood. It was used to find solutions to several problems that the Martlesham flights had revealed. The original fuel tanks, mounted just outboard of the innermost interplane struts and projecting both above and below the upper wing were found to be the source of aerodynamically-induced vibration at high angles of attack, so they were modified to have a top face matching the upper wing surface. The exhaust pipes were modified to avoid flame dazzle and flow into the cockpit by discharging at the forward end via "rams horn" exits; the ventral gun position was canvassed over, for there was such a draught through the dorsal and ventral openings that neither position was usable.

The Hawker Horsley won the specification trials, so no more Handcrosses were built. The last one stayed at Cricklewood until 1926, serving as a test machine and the second, moved from Farnborough to Martlesham, remained with the Armaments Trial Flight until 1928. The first machine was fitted with several different wooden two- and four-bladed propellers for comparison with the original metal two-bladers.

== Specifications ==
Data from Barnes & James 1987, p. 252

General characteristics

- Crew: two
- Length: 40 ft 0 in (12.2 m)
- Wingspan: 60 ft 0 in (18.3 m)
- Wing area: 788 sq ft (73.2 m^{2})
- Empty weight: 5,215 lb (2,360 kg)
- Gross weight: 7,500 lb (3,400 kg)
- Powerplant: 1 × Rolls-Royce Condor III upright V-12 watercooled , 670 hp (500 kW)

Performance

- Maximum speed: 120 mph (193 km/h, 100 kn)
- Range: 500 mi (805 km, 430 nmi)
- Service ceiling: 19,250 ft (5,950 m)

Armament

- 550 lb (250 kg) bomb load in port side ventral recess
- 1×fixed 0.303 in (7.7 mm) Vickers machine gun firing forward under pilot's control from starboard side forward decking
- 1× Scarff ring mounted 0.303 in (7.7 mm) Lewis gun in dorsal cockpit
- 1×0.303 in (7.7 mm) Lewis gun in ventral position

== See also ==
Aircraft of comparable role, configuration, and era

- Hawker Horsley
- Bristol Berkeley
