= Rolls-Royce Condor =

1918 aircraft piston engine

Condor
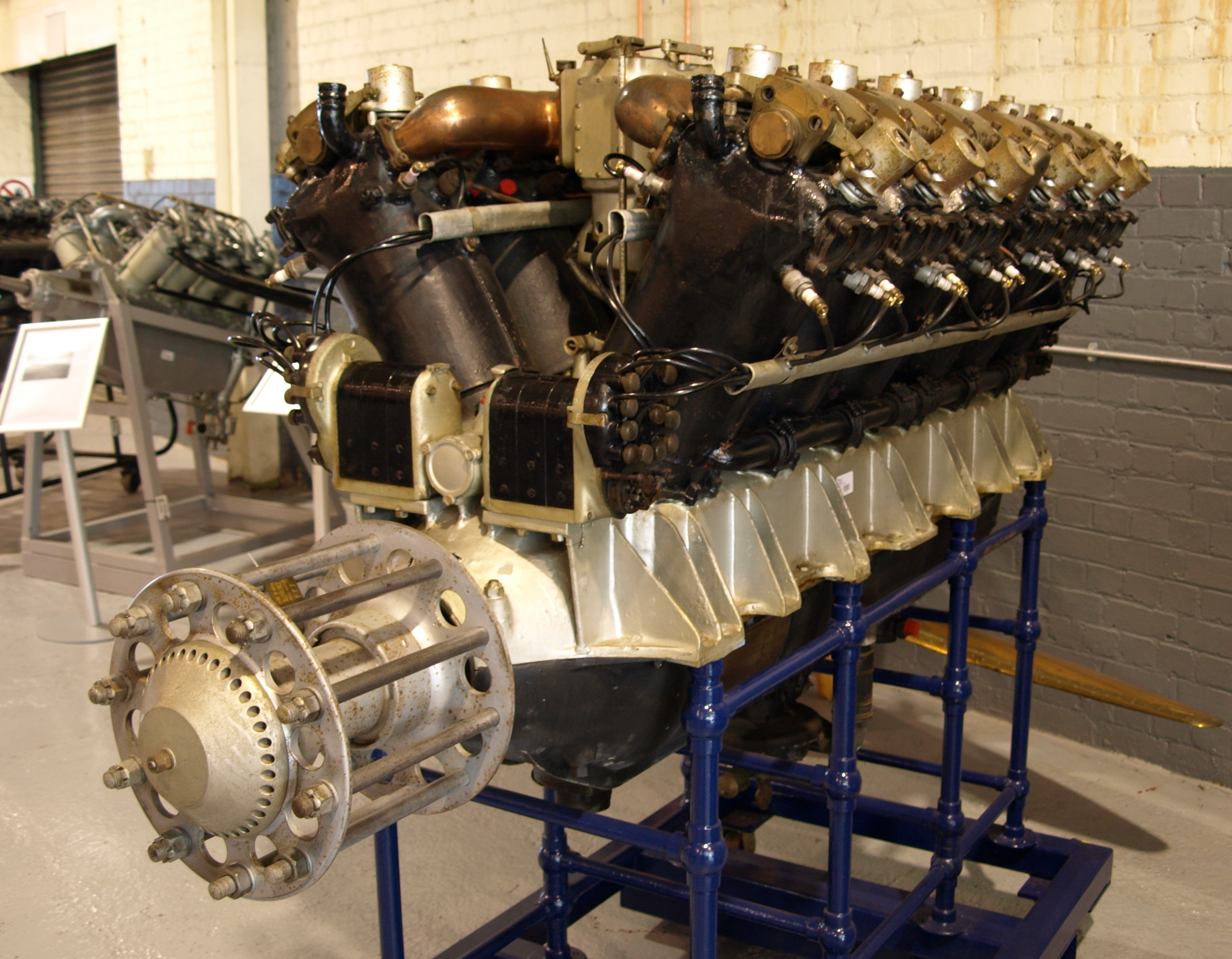
- Rolls-Royce Condor III on display at the Rolls-Royce Heritage Trust, Derby
- Type: Piston V12
- Manufacturer: Rolls-Royce Limited
- First run: 1918
- Number built: 327
- Developed from: Rolls-Royce Eagle

The Rolls-Royce Condor aircraft piston engine is a larger version of the Rolls-Royce Eagle developing up to 675 horsepower (503 kilowatts). The engine first ran in 1918 and a total of 327 engines were recorded as being built.

== Variants ==
Note:

Condor I
(1920–1921) 600 hp, 72 built at Derby.
Condor IA
Alternative designation for Condor II.
Condor II
(1921) 650 hp, revised propeller reduction gear ratio, increased compression ratio (5.17:1). 34 built at Derby.
Condor III
(1923–1927) 650/670 hp, compression ratio 6.5:1, Re-designed connecting rods. 196 built at Derby.
Condor IIIA
(1925) 650/665 hp. Improved main bearing design and material.
Condor IIIB
(1930) 650 hp, 0.477:1 reduction gear, re-designed crankcase and crankshaft.
Condor IV
(1925) 750 hp. Direct-drive, modified engine mounting. 13 built at Derby.
Condor IVA
(1927) 750 hp. Nine built at Derby.
Condor V
(1925) As Condor IIIA with two-stage turbocharger. Run but not flown, one built at Derby.
Condor VII
Direct-drive Condor IIIA, two built at Derby.
Condor C.I.
(1932) 480 hp, compression ignition (diesel), two engines tested and flown.

=== Compression ignition (diesel) variant ===
In 1932 the Air Ministry initiated a conversion of the Condor petrol engine to the compression ignition system. The conversion was developed at the Royal Aircraft Establishment, Farnborough, with the co-operation of Rolls-Royce Ltd. Engine layout, bore, and stroke remained the same as for the petrol version; the compression ratio increased to 12.5:1. The more robust construction required to withstand the increased stresses increased the engine weight to 1,504 pounds (682 kg). At its maximum 2,000 rpm the engine developed 500 hp (373 kW), giving a power/weight ratio of 0.33 hp/lb.

The engine passed the 50-hour civil type test for compression ignition engines, being only the second British engine to do so. The only previous engine to pass this test was the much larger Beardmore Tornado fitted to the R101 airship. The diesel Condor was experimentally flown in a Hawker Horsley to explore the practical operation of a diesel engine in flight.

== Applications ==
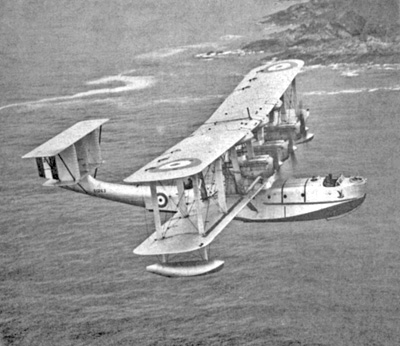
Rolls-Royce Condor powered Blackburn Iris seaplane

The Condor was used in the following aircraft:

- Avro Aldershot
- Avro Andover
- Avro Ava
- Beardmore Inflexible
- Blackburn Iris
- Bristol Berkeley
- de Havilland DH.27 Derby
- de Havilland DH.54 Highclere
- de Havilland DH.14 Okapi
- Fairey Fremantle
- Fairey N.4
- Handley Page Handcross
- Hawker Hornbill
- Hawker Horsley
- R100
- Rohrbach Ro V Rocco
- Saunders Valkyrie
- Short Singapore
- Vickers Valentia
- Vickers Vanguard
- Vickers Vixen
- Vickers Virginia
- Westland Yeovil

== Specifications (Condor III) ==
Data from Lumsden

=== General characteristics ===
- Type: 12-cylinder liquid-cooled 60 deg. Vee aircraft piston engine
- Bore: 5.5 inches (140 mm)
- Stroke: 7.5 inches (190 mm)
- Displacement: 2,137.5 cu in (35.027 L)
- Length: 69.3 inches (1,760 mm)
- Width: 41.1 inches (1,040 mm)
- Height: 43.2 inches (1,100 mm)
- Dry weight: 1,380 pounds (630 kg)

=== Components ===
- Valvetrain: Overhead camshaft
- Fuel system: 2 x Claudel-Hobson carburettors
- Fuel type: Petrol
- Cooling system: Liquid-cooled

=== Performance ===
- Power output: 670 bhp (500 kW) at 1,900 rpm
- Compression ratio: 5.1:1
- Power-to-weight ratio: 0.48 hp/lb

== See also ==
- Rolls-Royce aircraft piston engines

Related development

- Rolls-Royce Eagle

Comparable engines

- Siddeley Tiger

Related lists

- List of aircraft engines
