= List of bomber aircraft =

Bomber aircraft are military aircraft primarily designed for air-to-surface attack, on either ground or sea targets. This list does not include airships used for bombing and does not aim to include attack aircraft primarily intended for different roles. There are bound to be some overlap in roles and designs and some multirole combat aircraft could appear in more than one list. There are separate lists of fighter aircraft, ground attack aircraft and trainers. This list does not include fictional aircraft.

Type	Country	Class	Role	Date	Status	No.	Notes
AEG G.I	Germany		bomber	1915	Retired	1	
AEG G.II	Germany		bomber	1915	Retired	20 ca.	
AEG G.III	Germany		bomber	1915	Retired	25	
AEG G.IV	Germany		Heavy bomber	1916	Retired	320	
AEG G.V	Germany		Heavy bomber	1918	Retired	151	
AEG N.I	Germany		Night bomber	1918	Retired	37	
AEG R.I	Germany		Heavy bomber	1916	Prototype	1	
Aermacchi MB-339	Italy	Jet	trainer/attack	1976	Operational	213+ (Note: Production figure includes trainers)	
Aero A.100	Czechoslovakia		Reconnaissance bomber	1933	Retired	44	
Aero A.101	Czechoslovakia		Reconnaissance bomber	1934	Retired	143	
Aero A.11	Czechoslovakia		Reconnaissance bomber	1925	Retired	440	
Aero A.12	Czechoslovakia		Reconnaissance bomber	1923	Retired	93	
Aero A.24	Czechoslovakia		Bomber	1924	Prototype	1	
Aero A.30	Czechoslovakia		Light bomber	1927	Retired	20	
Aero A.304	Czechoslovakia		Bomber	1937	Retired	19	
Aero A.42	Czechoslovakia		Bomber	1929	Prototype	2	
Aichi B7A	Japan		Torpedo/dive bomber	1942	Retired	114	
Aichi D1A	Japan		Dive bomber	1934	Retired	590	
Aichi D3A	Japan		Dive bomber	1938	Retired	1,486	
Aichi M6A	Japan		Torpedo bomber	1943	Retired	28	
Airco DH.10 Amiens	UK		Heavy bomber	1918	Retired	258	
Airco DH.11	UK		Bomber	1919	Prototype	1	
Airco DH.3	UK		Heavy bomber	1916	Prototype	2	
Airco DH.4	UK		Bomber	1916	Retired	6,295	
Airco DH.9	UK		Bomber	1917	Retired	4,091	
Airco DH.9A	UK		Bomber	1918	Retired	1,997	
Airspeed Oxford	UK		Bomber/trainer	1937	Retired	8,586	
Albatros C.III	Germany		Light bomber	1915	Retired	2,271	
Albatros C.VII/N.I	Germany		Night bomber	1916	Retired	600+	
Albatros G.I	Germany		Heavy bomber	1916	Prototype	1	
Albatros G.II	Germany		Heavy bomber	1916	Prototype	1	
Albatros G.III	Germany		Heavy bomber	1915	Retired	45	
Amiot 143M	France		Medium bomber	1931	Retired	138	
Amiot 354	France		Medium bomber	1939	Retired	86 ca.	ANBO VIII
ANBO VIII	Lithuania		Light bomber	1939	Prototype	1	
ANF Les Mureaux 110	France		Reconnaissance bomber	1931	Retired	285	
Arado Ar 234	Germany		Reconnaissance bomber	1943	Retired	210	
Archangelski Ar-2	USSR		Dive bomber	1940	Retired	190	
Armstrong Whitworth A.W.19	UK		Multi-role bomber	1934	Prototype	1	
Armstrong Whitworth Albemarle	UK		Bomber/transport	1940	Retired	602	
Armstrong Whitworth Atlas	UK		Reconnaissance bomber	1925	Retired	478	
Armstrong Whitworth AW.23	UK		Heavy bomber	1935	Prototype	1	
Armstrong Whitworth F.K.8	UK		Reconnaissance bomber	1916	Retired	1,650	
Armstrong Whitworth Whitley	UK		Bomber/maritime patrol	1936	Retired	1,814	
Avro 504	UK		Bomber/trainer/fighter	1913	Retired	11,303	
Avro 523 Pike	UK		Heavy bomber	1916	Prototype	2	
Avro 529	UK		Heavy bomber	1917	Prototype	2	
Avro 533 Manchester	UK		Heavy bomber	1918	Prototype	3	
Avro 549 Aldershot	UK		Heavy bomber	1921	Retired	17	
Avro 604 Antelope	UK		Reconnaissance bomber	1928	Prototype	1	
Avro Anson	UK		Maritime patrol	1935	Retired	11,020	
Avro Lancaster	UK		Heavy bomber/maritime patrol	1941	Retired	7,377	
Avro Lincoln	UK		Heavy bomber	1944	Retired	604	
Avro Manchester	UK		Heavy bomber	1939	Retired	209	
Avro Shackleton	UK		Maritime patrol	1949	Retired	185	(Note: Production figure includes AEW variant)
Avro Vulcan	UK	Jet	Heavy bomber	1952	Retired	136	
BAC TSR-2	UK	Jet	Reconnaissance bomber	1964	Prototype	2	
Beardmore W.B.1	UK		Bomber	1917	Prototype	1	
Beardmore W.B.VI	UK		Torpedo bomber	n/a	cancelled project	0	
Beechcraft XA-38 Grizzly	US		Attack	1944	Prototype	2	
Bellanca 77-140	US		Bomber	1934	Retired	4	
Beriev Be-10	USSR		Maritime patrol	1956	Retired	28	
Beriev Be-12	USSR		Maritime patrol	1960	Operational	143	
Beriev Be-4	USSR		Maritime patrol	1940	Retired	47	
Beriev Be-6	USSR		Maritime patrol	1949	Retired	123	
Blackburn B-3	UK		Torpedo bomber	1932	Prototype	2	
Blackburn B-48 Firecrest	UK		Fighter bomber	1947	Prototype	3	
Blackburn B-7	UK		Dive bomber	1934	Prototype	1	
Blackburn Baffin	UK		Torpedo bomber	1932	Retired	97	
Blackburn Beagle	UK		Torpedo bomber	1928	Prototype	2	
Blackburn Blackburd	UK		Torpedo bomber	1918	Prototype	3	
Blackburn Botha	UK		Torpedo bomber	1938	Retired	580	
Blackburn Buccaneer	UK		Attack	1958	Retired	206	
Blackburn Cubaroo	UK		Torpedo bomber	1924	Prototype	2	
Blackburn Dart	UK		Torpedo bomber	1921	Retired	126	
Blackburn Firebrand	UK		Torpedo bomber/fighter	1942	Retired	193	
Blackburn Kangaroo	UK		Maritime patrol/heavy bomber	1918	Retired	20	
Blackburn Perth	UK		Maritime patrol flying boat	1933	Retired	4	
Blackburn Ripon	UK		Torpedo bomber	1926	Retired	92	
Blackburn Shark	UK		Torpedo bomber	1933	Retired	269	
Blackburn Skua	UK		Dive bomber	1937	Retired	192	
Blackburn Velos	UK		Torpedo bomber	1925	Retired	22	
Blériot 127	France		Heavy bomber	1926	Retired	44	
Bleriot XI	France		Reconnaissance bomber	1909	Retired	100+	
Bloch MB.131	France		Reconnaissance bomber	1936	Retired	143	
Bloch MB.174	France		Reconnaissance bomber	1939	Retired	225+	
Bloch MB.200	France		Heavy bomber	1933	Retired	332	
Boeing B-17 Flying Fortress	US		Heavy bomber	1935	Retired	12,731	
Boeing B-29 Superfortress	US		Heavy bomber	1942	Retired	3,970	Washington in UK service
Boeing B-47 Stratojet	US	Jet	Heavy bomber	1947	Retired	2,032	
Boeing B-50 Superfortress	US		Heavy bomber	1947	Retired	370	
Boeing B-52 Stratofortress	US	Jet	Heavy bomber	1952	Operational	744	
Boeing XB-54	US		Heavy bomber	1948	Project	0	
Boeing Model 306	US		Heavy bomber	1935	Project	0	
Boeing P-8 Poseidon	US	Jet	Maritime patrol	2009	Operational	150+	
Boeing XB-15	US		Heavy bomber	1937	Prototype	1	
Boeing XB-38 Flying Fortress	US		Heavy bomber	1943	Prototype	1	
Boeing XB-39 Superfortress	US		Heavy bomber	1944	Prototype	1	
Boeing XB-56	US		Heavy bomber	1950	Project	0	
Boeing XB-59	US		Heavy bomber	1952	Project	0	
Boeing XF8B	US		Fighter bomber	1944	Prototype	3	
Boeing YB-9	US		Heavy bomber	1931	Retired	7	
Bolkhovitinov DB-A	USSR		Heavy bomber	1935	Retired	14	
Boulton & Paul Bolton	UK		Heavy bomber	1922	Prototype	1	
Boulton & Paul Bugle	UK		Heavy bomber	1923	Retired	7	
Boulton Paul Bodmin	UK		Heavy bomber	1924	Prototype	2	
Boulton Paul Bourges	UK		Heavy bomber	1919	Prototype	3	
Boulton Paul Overstrand	UK		Heavy bomber	1933	Retired	28	
Boulton Paul P.32	UK		Night bomber	1931	Prototype	1	
Boulton Paul Sidestrand	UK		Heavy bomber	1926	Retired	20	
Breda A.14	Italy		Night bomber	1928	Prototype	1	
Breda A.8	Italy		Night bomber	1927	Prototype	1	
Breda Ba.46	Italy		Bomber/transport	1934	Prototype	1	
Breda Ba.64	Italy		Attack	1934	Retired	42	
Breda Ba.65	Italy		Attack	1935	Retired	218	
Breda Ba.88	Italy		Attack	1936	Retired	149	
Breguet 14	France		Reconnaissance bomber	1916	Retired	7,800	
Breguet 16	France		Night bomber	1918	Retired	200 ca.	
Breguet 19	France		Reconnaissance bomber	1922	Retired	2,700+	
Breguet 270 Series	France		Reconnaissance bomber	1929	Retired	227+	
Bréguet 410	France		Bomber	1931	Prototype	8	
Bréguet 460 Vultur	France		Bomber	1935	Prototype	5	
Breguet 693	France		Attack	1938	Retired	230	
Breguet Alizé	France		Maritime patrol	1956	Retired	89	
Breguet Atlantique	France		Maritime patrol	1961	Operational	115	
Breguet Bre.4	France		Bomber	1914	Retired	100 ca.	
Breguet Bre.5 & 6	France		Bomber	1915	Retired	50+	
Breguet Taon	France		Fighter bomber	1957	Prototype	2	
Breguet Vultur	France		Attack	1951	Prototype	2	
Brewster SB2A Buccaneer	US		Bomber	1941	Retired	771	
Bristol Beaufighter	UK		Fighter bomber/torpedo bomber	1939	Retired	5,928	
Bristol Beaufort	UK		Torpedo bomber	1938	Retired	2,129	
Bristol Berkeley	UK		Heavy bomber	1925	Prototype	3	
Bristol Blenheim	UK		Medium bomber	1935	Retired	4,422	
Bristol Bombay	UK		Heavy bomber/transport	1935	Retired	50	
Bristol Braemar	UK		Heavy bomber	1918	Prototype	2	
Bristol Buckingham	UK		Medium bomber	1943	Retired	119	
Bristol TB.8	UK		Bomber	1913	Retired	54	
Bristol Type 148	UK		Reconnaissance bomber	1937	Prototype	2	
British Aerospace Harrier II	UK		Attack	1985	Retired	143	
CAMS 33	France		Maritime patrol flying boat	1923	Retired	20	
CAMS 37	France		Maritime patrol flying boat	1926	Retired	332	(Note: Production figure includes aircraft used as transports)
CAMS 55	France		Maritime patrol flying boat	1928	Retired	112	
Canadair CP-107 Argus	Canada		Maritime patrol	1957	Retired	33	
CANSA FC.20bis	Italy		Bomber	1941	Prototype	6 ca.	
CANT Z.1007	Italy		Heavy bomber	1937	Retired	660	
CANT Z.1018	Italy		Medium bomber	1939	Prototype	15	
CANT Z.501	Italy		Maritime patrol flying boat	1934	Retired	200+	
CANT Z.506	Italy		Maritime patrol	1935	Retired	325+	
Caproni A.P.1	Italy		Attack	1934	Retired	56 ca.	
Caproni Ca.1	Italy		Heavy bomber	1914	Retired	162	
Caproni Ca.101	Italy		Bomber/transport	1928	Retired		
Caproni Ca.111	Italy		Reconnaissance bomber	1932	Retired	148	
Caproni Ca.2	Italy		Heavy bomber	1915	Retired	9	
Caproni Ca.3	Italy		Heavy bomber	1916	Retired	509	
Caproni Ca.310	Italy		Reconnaissance bomber	1937	Retired	312	
Caproni Ca.311	Italy		Reconnaissance bomber	1939	Retired	335	
Caproni Ca.313	Italy		Reconnaissance bomber	1939	Retired	271	
Caproni Ca.314	Italy		Torpedo bomber	1939	Retired	407	
Caproni Ca.316	Italy		Maritime patrol	1940	Retired	14	
Caproni Ca.355	Italy		Dive bomber	1941	Project	1	
Caproni Ca.4	Italy		Heavy bomber	1917	Retired	38	
Caproni Ca.5	Italy		Heavy bomber	1917	Retired	664	
Caproni Ca.73	Italy		Bomber/transport	1924	Retired		
Caproni Ca.90	Italy		Heavy bomber	1929	Prototype	1	
CASA CN-235MPA	Spain		Maritime patrol	1983	Operational		
Caudron G.4	France		Bomber	1915	Retired	1,421	
Caudron R.4	France		Reconnaissance bomber	1915	Retired	249	
Cessna A-37 Dragonfly	US	Jet	Attack	1963	Operational	577	
Chyetverikov ARK-3	USSR		Maritime patrol	1936	Prototype	7	
Chyetverikov MDR-3	USSR		Maritime patrol flying boat	1932	Prototype	2	
Chyetverikov MDR-6	USSR		Maritime patrol	1937	Retired	27	
Consolidated B-24 Liberator	US		Heavy bomber	1939	Retired	18,482	
Consolidated B-32 Dominator	US		Heavy bomber	1942	Retired	118	
Consolidated P2Y	US		Maritime patrol flying boat	1929	Retired	78	
Consolidated PB2Y Coronado	US		Maritime patrol flying boat	1937	Retired	217	
Consolidated PB4Y-2 Privateer	US		Maritime patrol	1943	Retired	739	
Consolidated PBY Catalina	US		Maritime patrol flying boat/amphibian	1935	Retired	4,051 ca.	
Vought TBU/Consolidated TBY Sea Wolf	US		Torpedo bomber	1941	Retired	180	
Consolidated XP4Y Corregidor	US		Maritime patrol flying boat	1939	Prototype	1	
Convair B-36	US		Heavy bomber	1946	Retired	384	
Convair B-58 Hustler	US		Heavy bomber	1956	Retired	116	
Convair XB-46	US		Heavy bomber	1947	Prototype	1	
Convair YB-60	US		Heavy bomber	1952	Prototype	2	
Curtiss A-12 Shrike	US		Attack	1933	Retired	46	
Curtiss A-18 Shrike	US		Attack	1935	Retired	13	
Curtiss A-8	US		Attack	1931	Retired	13	
Curtiss B-2 Condor	US		Heavy bomber	1929	Retired	13	
Curtiss BF2C Goshawk	US		Fighter bomber	1933	Retired	166	
Curtiss CS	US		Torpedo bomber	1923	Retired	83	
Curtiss F5L	US		Maritime patrol flying boat	1918	Retired	227	
Curtiss A-3/A-4 Falcon	US		Attack	1924	Retired	155	
Curtiss HS	US		Maritime patrol flying boat	1917	Retired	1,178	
Curtiss Model H	US		Maritime patrol flying boat	1917	Retired	478	
Curtiss SB2C Helldiver/A-25 Shrike	US		Dive bomber	1940	Retired	7,140	
Curtiss SBC Helldiver	US		Dive bomber	1935	Retired	257	
Curtiss T-32 Condor II	US		Bomber/transport	1933	Retired	45	
Curtiss XA-14	US		Attack	1935	Prototype	1	
Curtiss XBTC	US		Torpedo bomber	1945	Prototype	2	
Curtiss XSB3C	US		Dive bomber	1941	Project	0	
Curtiss YA-10 Shrike	US		Attack	1932	Prototype	2	
DAR 10	Bulgaria		Reconnaissance bomber	1941	Prototype	2	
Dassault Mirage IV	France		Heavy bomber	1959	Retired	66	
Dassault Ouragan	France		Fighter bomber	1949	Retired	567	
Dassault-Breguet Super Étendard	France	Jet	Attack	1974	Retired	85	
de Havilland DH.14 Okapi	UK		Heavy bomber	1919	Prototype	3	
de Havilland DH.27 Derby	UK		Heavy bomber	1922	Prototype	2	
de Havilland DH.65 Hound	UK		Reconnaissance bomber	1926	Prototype	1	
de Havilland DH.72	UK		Night bomber	1931	Prototype	1	
De Havilland DH.98 Mosquito	UK		Fighter bomber	1940	Retired	7,781	(Note: Production figure includes fighters or other non-bomber variants)
de Havilland Venom	UK		Fighter bomber	1949	Retired	1,431	
DFW R.I	Germany		Heavy bomber	1916	Prototype	1	
DFW R.II	Germany		Heavy bomber	1918	Prototype	2	
DFW R.III	Germany		Heavy bomber	n/a	cancelled project	0	
Dornier Do P	Germany		Heavy bomber	1930	Prototype	1	
Dornier Do Y	Germany		Bomber	1931	Retired	4	
Dornier Do 11	Germany		Heavy bomber	1932	Retired	372	
Dornier Do 17	Germany		Bomber	1934	Retired	2,139	
Dornier Do 19	Germany		Heavy Bomber	1936	Retired	3	
Dornier Do 215	Germany		Medium bomber	1938	Retired	105	
Dornier Do 217	Germany		Heavy bomber	1938	Retired	1,925	
Dornier Do 22	Germany		Torpedo bomber	1935	Retired	30 ca.	
Dornier 228	Germany		Maritime patrol	1981	Retired	270	
Dornier Do 23	Germany		Heavy bomber	1934	Retired	282	
Dornier Do 24	Germany		Maritime patrol	1937	Retired	279	
Dornier Do 28	Germany		Maritime patrol	1959	Retired	10	
Dornier Do 317	Germany		Medium bomber	1943	Prototype	6	
Douglas A-1 Skyraider	US		Attack	1945	Retired	3,180	
Douglas A-20 Havoc	US		Attack	1939	Retired	7,478	
Douglas A-26 Invader	US		Attack	1942	Retired	2,452	
Douglas A-3 Skywarrior	US		Heavy bomber	1956	Retired	282	
Douglas A-4 Skyhawk	US	Jet	Attack aircraft	1954	Operational	2,960	
Douglas A2D Skyshark	US		Attack	1950	Prototype	8	
Douglas B-18 Bolo	US		Maritime patrol/medium bomber	1935	Retired	350	
Douglas B-23 Dragon	US		Bomber/transport	1939	Retired	38	
Douglas B-66 Destroyer	US		Medium bomber	1954	Retired	72	
Douglas BTD Destroyer	US		Torpedo/dive bomber	1943	Retired	30	
Douglas DT	US		Torpedo bomber	1921	Retired	90	
Douglas SBD Dauntless	US		Dive bomber	1940	Retired	5,936	
Douglas TBD Devastator	US		Torpedo bomber	1935	Retired	130	
Douglas XB-19	US		Heavy bomber	1941	Prototype	1	
Douglas XB-22	US		Medium bomber	n/a	Project	0	
Douglas XTB2D Skypirate	US		Torpedo bomber	1945	Prototype	2	
Douglas Y1B-7	US		Heavy bomber	1931	Prototype	8	
English Electric Canberra	UK		Reconnaissance bomber	1949	Retired	949	
Fairey Albacore	UK		Torpedo bomber	1938	Retired	800	
Fairey Barracuda	UK		Torpedo/dive bomber	1940	Retired	2,607	
Fairey Battle	UK		Medium bomber	1936	Retired	2,185	
Fairey Campania	UK		Maritime patrol	1917	Retired	62	
Fairey Fawn	UK		Reconnaissance bomber	1923	Retired	75	
Fairey Ferret	UK		Reconnaissance bomber	1925	Prototype	3	
Fairey Fox	UK		Reconnaissance bomber	1925	Retired		
Fairey G.4/31	UK		Bomber	1934	Prototype	1	
Fairey Gannet	UK		Maritime patrol	1949	Retired	348	
Fairey Gordon	UK		Reconnaissance bomber	1931	Retired	186	
Fairey Hendon	UK		Heavy bomber	1930	Retired	15	
Fairey III	UK		Reconnaissance bomber	1917	Retired	964	
Fairey P.4/34	UK		Reconnaissance bomber	1937	Prototype	2	
Fairey Seal	UK		Reconnaissance bomber	1930	Retired	91	
Fairey Swordfish	UK		Torpedo bomber	1934	Retired	2,391	
Farman F.140 Super Goliath	France		Night bomber	1924	Retired	9	
Farman F.150	France		Heavy bomber	1926	Prototype	1+	
Farman F.160	France		Heavy bomber	1928	Retired	250	
Farman F.220	France		Heavy bomber	1932	Retired	80 ca.	
Farman F.50	France		Night bomber	1918	Retired	100+	
Farman F.60 Goliath	France		Heavy bomber	1919	Prototype	3	
Felixstowe F.2	UK		Maritime patrol flying boat	1917	Retired	175	
Felixstowe F.3	UK		Maritime patrol flying boat	1917	Retired	182	
Felixstowe F.5	UK		Maritime patrol flying boat	1918	Retired	53	
Felixstowe Fury	UK		Maritime patrol flying boat	1918	Prototype	1	
Fiat Br.20	Italy		Medium bomber	1936	Retired	500+	
Fiat BR	Italy		Bomber	1919	Retired	250+	
Fiat BRG	Italy		Bomber	1931	Prototype	1	
Fiat RS.14	Italy		Maritime patrol	1939	Retired	188	
Fieseler Fi 167	Germany		Torpedo bomber	1937	Retired	14	
Fieseler Fi 98	Germany		Dive bomber	1935	Prototype	1	
FMA AeMB.2	Argentina		Reconnaissance bomber	1935	Retired	16	
FMA IA 58 Pucará	Argentina		Attack	1969	Operational	150+	
Focke-Wulf Fw 200 Condor	Germany		Maritime patrol/transport	1937	Retired	276	
Focke-Wulf Fw 300	Germany		Heavy bomber	1941	Project	0	
Focke-Wulf Fw 42	Germany		Medium bomber	n/a	Project	0	
Focke-Wulf Ta 400	Germany		Heavy bomber	1943	Project	0	
Fokker C.V	Netherlands		Reconnaissance bomber	1924	Retired	955	
Fokker C.X	Netherlands		Reconnaissance bomber	1934	Retired	71	
Fokker K.I	Germany		Bomber	1915	Prototype	1	
Fokker T.IV	Netherlands		Maritime patrol torpedo bomber	1927	Retired	33	
Fokker T.V	Netherlands		Torpedo bomber	1937	Retired	16	
Fokker T.VIII	Netherlands		Torpedo bomber	1938	Retired	36	
Fokker XB-8	US		Heavy bomber	1929	Prototype	7	
Friedrichshafen FF.41	Germany		Reconnaissance bomber	1917	Retired	9	
Friedrichshafen G.I	Germany		Heavy bomber	1915	Prototype	1	
Friedrichshafen G.II	Germany		Heavy bomber	1916	Retired	35	
Friedrichshafen G.III	Germany		Heavy bomber	1917	Retired	338	
Friedrichshafen G.IV	Germany		Heavy bomber	1918	Prototype	1	
Friedrichshafen G.V	Germany		Heavy bomber	1918	Prototype	1	
General Dynamics F-111	US	Jet	Strike bomber	1967	Retired	563	
Gloster Goral	UK		Reconnaissance bomber	1927	Prototype	1	
Gloster TSR.38	UK		Torpedo bomber	1932	Prototype	1	
Gotha G.I	Germany		Heavy bomber	1915	Retired	20	
Gotha G.II	Germany		Heavy bomber	1916	Retired	11	
Gotha G.III	Germany		Heavy bomber	1916	Retired	25	
Gotha G.IV	Germany		Heavy bomber	1916	Retired	230	
Gotha G.IX	Germany		Heavy bomber	1918	Retired	90 ca.	
Gotha G.V	Germany		Heavy bomber	1917	Retired	205	
Gotha G.VI	Germany		Heavy bomber	1918	Prototype	2	
Gotha GL.VII	Germany		Medium bomber	1918	Retired	20 ca.	
Gotha G.VIII	Germany		Heavy bomber	1918	Prototype	1	
Gotha G.X	Germany		Heavy bomber	1918	Prototype	2	
Grahame-White Ganymede	UK		Heavy bomber	1919	Prototype	1	
Great Lakes BG	US		Dive bomber	1933	Retired	61	
Grigorovich TB-5	USSR		Heavy bomber	1931	Prototype	1	
Grumman A-6 Intruder	US	Jet	Attack	1960	Retired	693	
Grumman AF Guardian	US		Maritime patrol	1945	Retired	389	
Grumman F9F Panther	US	Jet	Fighter bomber	1947	Retired	1,382	
Grumman OV-1 Mohawk	US		Reconnaissance bomber	1959	Retired	380	
Grumman S-2 Tracker	US		Maritime patrol	1952	Operational	1,284	
Grumman TBF Avenger	US		Torpedo bomber	1941	Retired	9,839	
Grumman XTB2F	US		Torpedo bomber	1944	Project	0	
HAL HF-24 Marut	India		Fighter bomber	1961	Retired	147	
Hall XPTBH	US		Torpedo bomber	1937	Prototype	1	
Handley Page H.P.19 Hanley	UK		Torpedo bomber	1922	Prototype	3	
Handley Page H.P.24 Hyderabad	UK		Heavy bomber	1925	Retired	44	
Handley Page H.P.25 Hendon	UK		Torpedo bomber	1924	Prototype	6	
Handley Page H.P.28 Handcross	UK		Heavy bomber	1924	Prototype	3	
Handley Page H.P.31 Harrow	UK		Torpedo bomber	1926	Prototype	2	
Handley Page H.P.33 Hinaidi	UK		Heavy bomber	1927	Retired	36	
Handley Page H.P.34 Hare	UK		Bomber	1928	Prototype	1	
Handley Page H.P.43	UK		Bomber/transport	1932	Prototype	1	
Handley Page H.P.46	UK		Torpedo bomber	1932	Prototype	1	
Handley Page H.P.47	UK		Torpedo bomber	1934	Prototype	1	
Handley Page H.P.50 Heyford	UK		Heavy bomber	1930	Retired	125	
Handley Page H.P.51	UK		Bomber/transport	1935	Prototype	1	
Handley Page Harrow	UK		Bomber/transport	1936	Retired	100	
Handley Page Halifax	UK		Heavy bomber	1939	Retired	6,178	
Handley Page Hampden/Hereford	UK		Medium bomber	1936	Retired	1,430	
Handley Page Type O	UK		Heavy bomber	1915	Retired	600	
Handley Page V/1500	UK		Heavy bomber	1918	Retired	41	
Handley Page Victor	UK	Jet	Heavy bomber	1952	Retired	86	
Harbin H-5	USSR/China		Medium bomber	1948	Operational	319+	
Harbin H-7	China		Medium bomber	1965	Project		
Harbin SH-5	China		Maritime patrol flying boat	1976	Operational	6	
Hawker Audax	UK		Reconnaissance bomber	1931	Retired	700+	
Hawker Dantorp	UK		Torpedo bomber	1932	Retired	2	
Hawker Hardy	UK		Reconnaissance bomber	1934	Retired	48	
Hawker Hart	UK		Reconnaissance bomber	1928	Retired	992	
Hawker Hector	UK		Reconnaissance bomber	1936	Retired	179	
Hawker Henley	UK		Reconnaissance bomber	1937	Retired	200	
Hawker Hind	UK		Reconnaissance bomber	1934	Retired	528	
Hawker Horsley	UK		Torpedo bomber	1925	Retired	122	
Hawker Hunter	UK		Fighter bomber	1951	Retired	278	
Hawker Siddeley Harrier	UK		Attack	1974	Retired	900	
Hawker Typhoon	UK		Fighter bomber	1940	Retired	3,317	
Hawker-Siddeley Nimrod	UK		Maritime patrol	1967	Retired	51	
Heinkel He 111	Germany		Heavy bomber	1935	Retired	6,508	
Heinkel He 115	Germany		Maritime patrol	1937	Retired	138	
Heinkel He 177	Germany		Heavy bomber	1939	Retired	1,169	
Heinkel He 274	Germany		Heavy bomber	1945	Prototype	2	
Heinkel He 277	Germany		Heavy bomber	1943	Project	0	
Heinkel He 45	Germany		Reconnaissance bomber	1931	Retired	512	
Heinkel He 50	Germany		Dive bomber	1931	Retired	78	
Heinkel He 59	Germany		Torpedo bomber	1931	Retired	142	
Heinkel He 70	Germany		Medium bomber	1932	Retired	324	
Henschel Hs 123	Germany		Dive bomber	1935	Retired	250 ca.	
Henschel Hs 129	Germany		Attack	1939	Retired	865	
Hiro G2H	Japan		Heavy bomber	1933	Retired	8	
Hiro H1H	Japan		Maritime patrol flying boat	1927	Retired	65	
Hiro H2H	Japan		Maritime patrol flying boat	1930	Retired	17	
Hiro H4H	Japan		Maritime patrol flying boat	1931	Retired	47	
Hispano HA-200	Spain		Attack	1955	Retired	200	
Huff-Daland XB-1	US		Heavy bomber	1927	Prototype	1	
I.Ae. 24 Calquin	Argentina		Bomber	1946	Retired	101	
Ilyushin DB-3	USSR		Heavy bomber	1935	Retired	1,528	
Ilyushin Il-10 & Avia B-33	USSR		Attack	1944	Retired	6,166	
Ilyushin Il-102	USSR		Attack	1982	Prototype	2	
Ilyushin Il-2	USSR		Attack	1939	Retired	36,183	
Ilyushin Il-28	USSR		Medium bomber	1948	Operational	6,316	
Ilyushin Il-38	USSR		Maritime patrol	1967	Operational	58	
Ilyushin Il-4	USSR		Medium bomber	1936	Retired	5,256	
Ilyushin Il-40	USSR		Attack	1953	Prototype	7	
Ilyushin Il-54	USSR		Medium bomber	1955	Prototype	2	
Ilyushin Il-6	USSR		Bomber	1943	Prototype	4	
Ilyushin Il-8	USSR		Attack	1943	Prototype	3	
Junkers A 35	Germany		Reconnaissance bomber	1926	Prototype	186	
Junkers R 42/JuG-1	Germany		Bomber/transport	1924	Retired	52	
Junkers Ju 188	Germany		Medium bomber	1940	Retired	1,234	
Junkers Ju 287	Germany		Bomber	1944	Prototype	2	
Junkers Ju 288	Germany		Bomber	1940	Prototypes	22	
Junkers Ju 290	Germany		Maritime patrol/heavy bomber	1942	Retired	65	
Junkers Ju 388	Germany		Reconnaissance bomber	1943	Retired	100 ca.	
Junkers Ju 390	Germany		Maritime patrol/transport	1943	Prototype	2	
Junkers Ju 488	Germany		Bomber	n/a	Prototype	2	
Junkers Ju 52	Germany		Bomber/transport	1930	Retired	4,845	
Junkers Ju 86	Germany		Reconnaissance bomber	1934	Retired	900 ca.	
Junkers Ju 87	Germany		Dive bomber	1935	Retired	6,500 ca.	
Junkers Ju 88	Germany		Medium bomber	1936	Retired	15,000 ca.	
Junkers Ju 89	Germany		Heavy bomber	1937	Prototype	2	
Junkers K 37	Germany		Heavy bomber	1927	Prototype	2	
Junkers K 43	Germany		Bomber/transport	1926	Prototype	2,000+	
Junkers K 47	Germany		Dive bomber	1929	Retired	23	
Kaiser-Fleetwings XBTK	US		Torpedo/dive bomber	1945	Prototype	5	
Kalinin K-7	USSR		Heavy bomber	1933	Prototype	1	
Kawanishi E7K	Japan		Reconnaissance bomber	1933	Retired	533	
Kawanishi H6K	Japan		Maritime patrol flying boat	1936	Retired	215	
Kawanishi H8K	Japan		Maritime patrol flying boat	1941	Retired	167	
Dornier Do N	Germany		Bomber	1928	Retired	26	
Kawasaki Ki-102	Japan		Attack	1944	Retired	238	
Kawasaki Ki-3	Japan		Reconnaissance bomber	1933	Retired	243	
Kawasaki Ki-32	Japan		Reconnaissance bomber	1937	Retired	854	
Kawasaki Ki-48	Japan		Reconnaissance bomber	1939	Retired	1,997	
Kawasaki P-1	Japan		Maritime patrol	2007	Operational	60+	
Kennedy Giant	UK		Heavy bomber	1917	Prototype	1	
Keystone B-3	US		Reconnaissance bomber	1929	Retired	36	
Keystone B-4	US		Heavy bomber	1930	Retired	30	
Keystone B-5	US		Heavy bomber	1929	Retired	30	
Keystone B-6	US		Heavy bomber	1931	Retired	44	
Kharkov KhAI-5	USSR		Reconnaissance bomber	1936	Retired	500+	
Kyushu Q1W	Japan		Maritime patrol	1943	Retired	153	
LACAB GR.8	Belgium		Heavy bomber	1936	Prototype	1	
Latécoère 290	France		Torpedo bomber	1931	Retired	35	
Latécoère 298	France		Torpedo bomber	1936	Retired	121	
Latécoère 302	France		Torpedo bomber flying boat	1931	Prototype	3	
Latécoère 381	France		Maritime patrol flying boat	1930	Prototype	3	
Latécoère 521 & 523	France		Maritime patrol flying boat	1935	Prototype	4	
Latécoère 550	France		Torpedo bomber	1933	Prototype	1	
Latécoère 570	France		Medium bomber	1939	Prototype	1	
Latécoère 582	France		Torpedo bomber	1935	Prototype	1	
Latécoère 611	France		Maritime patrol flying boat	1939	Prototype	1	
Letov Š-16	Czechoslovakia		Reconnaissance bomber	1926	Retired	89	
Letov Š-28, 128, 228, 328, 428 & 528	Czechoslovakia		Reconnaissance bomber	1929	Retired	470	
Letov Š-33	Czechoslovakia		Reconnaissance bomber	1930	Prototype	1	
Letov Š-6	Czechoslovakia		Reconnaissance bomber	1923	Retired	35	
Levasseur PL.107	France		Torpedo bomber	1937	Prototype	2	
Levasseur PL.14	France		Torpedo bomber	1929	Retired	30	
Levasseur PL.15	France		Torpedo bomber	1932	Retired	17	
Levasseur PL.2	France		Torpedo bomber	1922	Retired	11	
Levasseur PL.7	France		Torpedo bomber	1928	Retired	46	
Linke-Hofmann R.I	Germany		Heavy bomber	1917	Prototype	4	
Linke-Hofmann R.II	Germany		Heavy bomber	1919	Prototype	2	
Lioré et Olivier LeO 20	France		Night bomber	1927	Retired	363 ca.	
Lioré et Olivier LeO 25	France		Heavy bomber	1928	Retired	97	
Lioré et Olivier LeO 45	France		Medium bomber	1937	Retired	561	
Lioré et Olivier LeO H-13	France		Night bomber	1922	Retired	30	
Lockheed F-117 Nighthawk	US		Bomber (stealth)	1981	Retired	64	
Lockheed Hudson	US		Maritime patrol	1938	Retired	2,941	
Lockheed P-3 Orion/CP-140 Aurora/Arcturus	US		Maritime patrol	1959	Operational	757	
Lockheed P2V Neptune	US		Maritime patrol	1945	Retired	1,132	
Lockheed Ventura/Harpoon	US		Maritime patrol	1941	Retired	3,010	
Lockheed XB-30	US		Heavy bomber - project	n/a	Project	0	
Loire 70	France		Maritime patrol flying boat	1933	Retired	8	
LWS-6 Zubr	Poland		Medium bomber	1936	Retired	17	
Macchi M.C.99	Italy		Maritime patrol	1937	Prototype	1	
Martin AM Mauler	US		Attack	1944	Retired	151	
Martin B-10 & related	US		Heavy bomber	1932	Retired	342	
Martin B-26 Marauder	US		Medium bomber	1940	Retired	5,288	
Martin B-57 Canberra	US	Jet	Reconnaissance bomber	1953	Retired	403	licence production of EE Canberra (Note: Production figure includes reconnaissance variants)
Martin Baltimore	US		Medium bomber	1941	Retired	1,575	
Martin Maryland	US		Medium bomber	1939	Retired	450	
Martin MBT/MT	US		Bomber	1918	Retired	20	
Martin NBS-1	US		Night bomber	1920	Retired	130	
Martin P4M Mercator	US		Maritime patrol	1946	Retired	21	
Martin P5M Marlin	US		Maritime patrol	1948	Retired	285	
Martin P6M SeaMaster	US	Jet	Heavy bomber	1955	Retired	12	Flying boat.
Martin PBM Mariner	US		Maritime patrol	1939	Retired	1,285	
Martin T3M	US		Torpedo bomber	1926	Retired	124	
Martin T4M	US		Torpedo bomber	1927	Retired	155	
Martin XB-27	US		Heavy bomber	n/a	Project	0	
Martin XB-33 Super Marauder	US		Heavy bomber	n/a	Project	0	
Martin XB-48	US		Medium bomber	1947	Prototype	2	
Martin XB-51	US		Attack	1949	Prototype	2	
Martinsyde G.100 and 102 Elephant	UK		Reconnaissance bomber	1915	Retired	271	
McDonnell Douglas A-12 Avenger II	US		Attack	1983	Project	0	
Messerschmitt Me 264	Germany		Maritime patrol/heavy bomber	1942	Prototype	3	
Mikoyan MiG-27	USSR	Jet	Attack	1970	Retired	1,075	
Mitsubishi 1MT	Japan		Torpedo bomber	1922	Retired	20	
Mitsubishi 2MB1	Japan		Reconnaissance bomber	1926	Retired	48	
Mitsubishi 3MT5	Japan		Torpedo bomber	1932	Retired	11	
Mitsubishi B1M	Japan		Torpedo bomber	1923	Retired	443	
Mitsubishi B2M	Japan		Torpedo bomber	1929	Retired	206	
Mitsubishi B5M	Japan		Torpedo bomber	1937	Retired	125 ca.	
Mitsubishi G1M	Japan		Heavy bomber	1934	Prototype	1	
Mitsubishi G3M	Japan		Attack	1935	Retired	1,048	
Mitsubishi G4M	Japan		Heavy bomber	1939	Retired	2,435	
Mitsubishi Ki-1	Japan		Heavy bomber	1932	Retired	118	
Mitsubishi Ki-2	Japan		Heavy bomber	1933	Retired	187	
Mitsubishi Ki-20	Japan		Heavy bomber	1932	Retired	6	
Mitsubishi Ki-21	Japan		Heavy bomber	1936	Retired	2,064	
Mitsubishi Ki-30	Japan		Reconnaissance bomber	1937	Retired	704	
Mitsubishi Ki-51	Japan		Dive bomber	1939	Retired	2,385	
Mitsubishi Ki-67	Japan		Heavy bomber	1941	Retired	767	
Morane-Saulnier Epervier	France		Attack	1958	Prototype	2	
Morane-Saulnier S	France		Heavy bomber	1915	Prototype	1	
Morane-Saulnier T	France		Heavy bomber	1916	Retired	90	
Morane-Saulnier TRK	France		Heavy bomber	1916	Prototype	1	
Myasishchev M-4	USSR		Heavy bomber	1953	Retired	93	
Myasishchev M-50	USSR		Heavy bomber	1959	Prototype	2	
Nakajima B5N	Japan		Torpedo bomber	1937	Retired	1,150 ca.	
Nakajima B6N	Japan		Torpedo bomber	1941	Retired	1,268	
Nakajima E4N	Japan		Reconnaissance bomber	1930	Retired	153	
Nakajima E8N	Japan		Reconnaissance bomber	1934	Retired	755	
Nakajima G10N	Japan		Heavy bomber	1943	Project	0	
Nakajima G5N	Japan		Heavy bomber	1941	Prototype	6	
Nakajima G8N	Japan		Heavy bomber	1944	Prototype	4	
Nakajima Ki-19	Japan		Heavy bomber	1937	Prototype	4	
Nakajima Ki-4	Japan		Reconnaissance bomber	1933	Retired	516	
Nakajima Ki-49	Japan		Heavy bomber	1939	Retired	819	
Nakajima LB-2	Japan		Heavy bomber	1936	Prototype	1	
Nanchang Q-5	China		Attack	1965	Operational	1,300	
Nanchang Q-6	China		Attack	1979	Project		
Naval Aircraft Factory SBN	US		Dive bomber	1936	Retired	31	
Nieuport 15	France		Heavy bomber	1916	Prototype	4	
Nieuport 18 and 19	France		Heavy bomber	n/a	cancelled project	0	
Nieuport London	UK		Night bomber	1920	Prototype	2	
Nieuport-Delage NiD 30B	France		Heavy bomber	n/a	Project	0	
Norman Thompson N.T.4	UK		Maritime patrol flying boat	1916	Retired	26	
North American A-27	US		Attack	1940	Retired	10	
North American A-5 Vigilante	US		Reconnaissance bomber	1958	Retired	156	
North American AJ/A-2 Savage	US		Heavy bomber	1948	Retired	143	
North American B-25 Mitchell	US		Medium bomber	1940	Retired	9,984	
North American B-45 Tornado	US		Reconnaissance bomber	1947	Retired	143	
North American Rockwell OV-10 Bronco	US		Reconnaissance bomber	1965	Retired	370	In service In NASA and Civil operator only
North American XA2J Super Savage	US		Bomber	1952	Prototype	1	
North American XB-21	US		Medium bomber	1936	Prototype	1	
North American XB-28	US		Medium bomber	1942	Prototype	2	
North American XB-70 Valkyrie	US	Jet	Heavy bomber	1964	Prototype	2	
Northrop A-17	US		Reconnaissance bomber	1935	Retired	446	
Northrop BT	US		Dive bomber	1935	Retired	55	
Northrop Grumman B-2 Spirit	US	Jet	Bomber (stealth)	1989	Operational	21	
Northrop Grumman B-21 Raider	US	Jet	Bomber (stealth)	2023	Prototype	6	
Northrop N-3PB	US		Maritime patrol bomber	1940	Retired	24	
Northrop YA-9	US		Attack	1972	Prototype	2	
Northrop YB-35	US		Heavy bomber	1946	Prototype	4	Flying wing.
Northrop YB-49	US	Jet	Heavy bomber	1947	Prototype	4	Flying wing.
OKB-1 140	USSR		Bomber	1948	Prototype	2	
OKB-1 EF 131	USSR		Bomber	1947	Prototype	1	
PAK DA	Russia		Attack	n/a	project	0	
Parnall G.4/31	UK		Reconnaissance bomber	1935	Prototype	1	
Parnall Pike	UK		Reconnaissance bomber	1927	Prototype	1	
Parnall Possum	UK		Heavy bomber	1923	Prototype	2	
Paul Schmitt PS.6	France		Reconnaissance bomber	1914	Retired	10 ca.	
Paul Schmitt PS.7	France		Reconnaissance bomber	1915	Retired	150 ca.	
Petlyakov Pe-2	USSR		Dive bomber	1939	Retired	11,400	
Petlyakov Pe-8	USSR		Heavy bomber	1936	Retired	93	
Piaggio P.108	Italy		Heavy bomber	1939	Retired	35 ca.	
Piaggio P.133	Italy		Heavy bomber	1943	Project	0	
Polikarpov R-5	USSR		Reconnaissance bomber	1928	Retired	5,170+	
Polikarpov R-Z	USSR		Reconnaissance bomber	1935	Retired	1,031	
Polikarpov TB-2	USSR		Heavy bomber	1930	Prototype	1	
Potez 15	France		Reconnaissance bomber	1921	Retired	545	
Potez 25	France		Reconnaissance bomber	1924	Retired	4,000 ca.	
Potez 540	France		Reconnaissance bomber	1933	Retired	271	
Potez 633	France		Reconnaissance bomber	1937	Retired	60 ca.	
PZL.23 Karaś	Poland		Reconnaissance bomber	1936	Retired	253	
PZL.37 Los	Poland		Medium bomber	1936	Retired	120+	
PZL.43 Karaś	Poland		Reconnaissance bomber	1937	Retired	52	
Republic AP-100	US		Strike fighter	1957	Project	0	
Rockwell B-1 Lancer	US	Jet	Heavy bomber	1974	Operational	104	
Royal Aircraft Factory B.E.2	UK		Reconnaissance bomber	1912	Retired	3,500 ca.	
Royal Aircraft Factory F.E.2	UK		Reconnaissance bomber	1914	Retired	1,939	
Royal Aircraft Factory R.E.5	UK		Reconnaissance bomber	1914	Retired	24	
Royal Aircraft Factory R.E.7	UK		Reconnaissance bomber	1915	Retired	230	
Royal Aircraft Factory R.E.8	UK		Reconnaissance bomber	1916	Retired	4,077	
Rumpler G.I, II & III	Germany		Heavy bomber	1915	Retired	220	
Rumpler Taube	Germany		Reconnaissance bomber	1910	Retired	263+	
Saab 17	Sweden		Dive bomber	1940	Retired	323	
Saab 18	Sweden		Medium bomber	1942	Retired	245	
SAB AB-20	France		Heavy bomber	1932	Prototype	1	
SAB AB-80	France		Bomber	1934	Prototype	1	
Sablatnig N.I	Germany		Night bomber	1918	Prototype	1	
Saro A.33	UK		Maritime patrol flying boat	1938	Prototype	1	
Saro Lerwick	UK		Maritime patrol flying boat	1938	Retired	21	
Saro London	UK		Maritime patrol	1934	Retired	31	
Saunders Severn	UK		Maritime patrol flying boat	1930	Prototype	1	
Saunders Valkyrie	UK		Maritime patrol flying boat	1926	Prototype	1	
Savoia-Marchetti S.55	Italy		Maritime patrol flying boat	1924	Retired	200+	
Savoia-Marchetti S.59	Italy		Maritime patrol flying boat	1925	Retired	240+	
Savoia-Marchetti SM.78	Italy		Maritime patrol flying boat	1932	Retired	49	
Savoia-Marchetti SM.79	Italy		Heavy bomber	1934	Retired	1,350	
Savoia-Marchetti SM.81	Italy		Bomber/transport	1934	Retired	535	
Savoia-Marchetti SM.82	Italy		Bomber/transport	1939	Retired	720	
Savoia-Marchetti SM.84	Italy		Torpedo bomber	1940	Retired	300+	
Shin Meiwa PS-1	Japan		Maritime patrol flying boat	1967	Retired	21	
Short Type 166	UK		Maritime patrol	1916	Retired	26	
Short Type 81	UK		Maritime patrol	1913	Retired	9	
Short Bomber	UK		Heavy bomber	1915	Retired	83	
Short Empire	UK		Maritime patrol/transport flying boat	1936	Retired	42	
Short Knuckleduster	UK		Maritime patrol flying boat	1933	Prototype	1	
Short N.2B	UK		Bomber	1917	Prototype	2	
Short Rangoon	UK		Maritime patrol flying boat	1930	Retired	6	
Short Sarafand	UK		Maritime patrol flying boat	1932	Prototype	1	
Short Seaford	UK		Maritime patrol flying boat	1944	Retired	10	
Short Seamew	UK		Maritime patrol	1953	Retired	26	
Short Shetland	UK		Maritime patrol flying boat	1944	Prototype	2	
Short Shirl	UK		Torpedo bomber	1918	Prototype	4	
Short Singapore	UK		Maritime patrol flying boat	1926	Retired	37	
Short Sperrin	UK		Heavy bomber	1951	Prototype	2	
Short Stirling	UK		Heavy bomber	1939	Retired	2,383	
Short Sturgeon	UK		Reconnaissance bomber	1946	Prototypes	28	
Short Sunderland	UK		Maritime patrol flying boat	1937	Retired	777	
Short Type 184	UK		Maritime patrol	1915	Retired	936	
Short Type 320	UK		Maritime patrol	1916	Retired	127	
Short Type 827 & 830	UK		Maritime patrol	1914	Retired	136	
SIAI S.16	Italy		Maritime patrol flying boat	1919	Retired	242 ca.	
Siddeley-Deasy Siniai	UK		Heavy bomber	1921	Prototype	1	
Siemens-Schuckert R.I	Germany		Heavy bomber	1915	Prototype	1	
Siemens-Schuckert R.II	Germany		Heavy bomber	1915	Prototype	1	
Siemens-Schuckert R.III	Germany		Heavy bomber	1915	Prototype	1	
Siemens-Schuckert R.IV	Germany		Heavy bomber	1916	Prototype	1	
Siemens-Schuckert R.IX	Germany		Heavy bomber	n/a	cancelled project	0	
Siemens-Schuckert R.V	Germany		Heavy bomber	1916	Prototype	1	
Siemens-Schuckert R.VI	Germany		Heavy bomber	1916	Prototype	1	
Siemens-Schuckert R.VII	Germany		Heavy bomber	1917	Prototype	1	
Siemens-Schuckert R.VIII	Germany		Heavy bomber	n/a	Prototype	2	
Sikorsky Ilya Muromets	Russia		Heavy bomber	1913	Retired	85+	
Silbervogel	Germany		Antipodal Bomber	1941	Project	0	Rocket Propulsion
SNCASE Baroudeur	France		Fighter bomber	1953	Prototype	5	
Sopwith 1½ Strutter	UK		Reconnaissance bomber	1915	Retired	5,639	
Sopwith B.1	UK		Torpedo bomber	1917	Prototype	2	
Sopwith Cuckoo	UK		Torpedo bomber	1918	Retired	232	
Sopwith Rhino	UK		Attack	1918	Prototype	2	
Sopwith Special torpedo seaplane Type C	UK		Torpedo bomber	1914	Prototype	1	
Sopwith Type 860	UK		Torpedo bomber	1914	Retired	22	
SPCA 30	France		Light bomber	1931	Prototype	2	
Sud Aviation Vautour	France		Medium bomber	1958	Retired	149	
Sukhoi Su-17	USSR	Jet	Fighter bomber	1966	Operational	2,867	
Sukhoi Su-2	USSR		Reconnaissance bomber	1937	Retired	910	
Sukhoi T-4	USSR		Heavy bomber	1972	Prototype	1	
Supermarine B.12/36	UK		Heavy bomber	n/a	prototype destroyed	0	
Supermarine Nanok	UK		Torpedo bomber flying boat	1927	Prototype	1	
Supermarine Scapa	UK		Maritime patrol flying boat	1932	Prototype	1	
Supermarine Southampton	UK		Maritime patrol flying boat	1925	Retired	84	
Supermarine Stranraer	UK		Maritime patrol flying boat	1934	Retired	57	
Supermarine Type 322	UK		Torpedo/dive bomber	1943	Prototype	2	
Tachikawa Ki-36	Japan		Reconnaissance bomber	1938	Retired	1,334	
Tachikawa Ki-74	Japan		Reconnaissance bomber	1944	Prototype	16	
Tarrant Tabor	UK		Heavy bomber	1919	Prototype	1	
Tupolev SB	USSR		Medium bomber	1934	Retired	6,945	
Tupolev TB-1	USSR		Heavy bomber	1925	Retired	218	
Tupolev TB-3	USSR		Heavy bomber	1930	Retired	819	
Tupolev TB-4	USSR		Heavy bomber	1933	Retired	1	
Tupolev TB-6	USSR		Heavy bomber	n/a	Project	0	
Tupolev Tu-14	USSR		Torpedo bomber	1949	Retired	150 ca.	
Tupolev Tu-142	USSR		Maritime patrol	1968	Operational	100	
Tupolev Tu-16	USSR		Heavy bomber	1952	Retired	1,509	
Tupolev Tu-160	USSR		Heavy bomber	1981	Operational	35	
Tupolev Tu-2	USSR		Medium bomber	1941	Retired	2,257	
Tupolev Tu-22	USSR	Jet	Medium bomber	1962	Retired	311	
Tupolev Tu-22M	USSR	Jet	Heavy bomber	1969	Operational	497	
Tupolev Tu-4	USSR		Heavy bomber	1947	Retired	847	
Tupolev Tu-85	USSR		Heavy bomber	1951	Retired	2	
Tupolev Tu-95	USSR		Heavy bomber	1952	Operational	500+	
Vickers Valiant	UK		Reconnaissance bomber	1927	Prototype	1	
Vickers Type 207	UK		Torpedo bomber	1933	Prototype	1	
Vickers Type 253	UK		Reconnaissance bomber	1934	Prototype	1	
Vickers Valentia	UK		Bomber/transport	1934	Retired	82	
Vickers Valiant	UK	Jet	Heavy bomber	1951	Retired	107	
Vickers Valparaiso	UK		Reconnaissance bomber	1923	Retired	28	
Vickers Vanox	UK		Heavy bomber	1929	Prototype	1	
Vickers Vincent and Vildebeest	UK		Torpedo bomber	1928	Retired	406	
Vickers Vimy	UK		Heavy bomber	1917	Retired	239	
Vickers Virginia	UK		Heavy bomber	1922	Retired	124	
Vickers Vixen	UK		Reconnaissance bomber	1923	Retired	20	
Vickers Warwick	UK		Maritime patrol	1939	Retired	842	
Vickers Wellesley	UK		Reconnaissance bomber	1935	Retired	177	
Vickers Wellington	UK		Medium bomber	1936	Retired	11,464	
Vickers Windsor	UK		Heavy bomber	1943	Retired	3	
Vickers Victory Bomber	UK		Heavy bomber	n/a	cancelled 1941 project	0	
Voisin III	France		Reconnaissance bomber	1914	Retired	800+	
Voisin V	France		Reconnaissance bomber	1915	Retired	350 ca.	
Voisin VIII	France		Reconnaissance bomber	1916	Retired	1,100 ca.	
Voisin X	France		Reconnaissance bomber	1917	Retired	900 ca.	
Voisin XI	France		Reconnaissance bomber	1918	Retired	10 ca.	
Voisin XII	France		Night bomber	1918	Prototype	1	
Vought F4U Corsair	US		Fighter bomber	1940	Retired	12,571	
Vought SB2U Vindicator/Chesapeake	US		Dive bomber	1936	Retired	260	
Vultee Vengeance	US		Dive bomber	1941	Retired	1,528	
Vultee V-11	US		Attack	1935	Retired	224	
Weiss WM-21 Sólyom	Hungary		Reconnaissance bomber	1937	Retired	128	
Westland Lysander	UK		Reconnaissance bomber	1936	Retired	1,786	
Westland PV-3	UK		Torpedo bomber	1931	Prototype	1	
Westland Wallace	UK		Reconnaissance bomber	1931	Retired	172	
Westland Wapiti	UK		Reconnaissance bomber	1927	Retired	585	
Westland Witch	UK		Reconnaissance bomber	1928	Prototype	1	
Wight Seaplane	UK		Maritime patrol	1915	Retired	52	
Witteman-Lewis XNBL-1 (Barling Bomber)	US		Heavy bomber	1923	Prototype	1	
Xian H-6	China		Medium bomber	1959	Operational	162+	
Xian H-8	China		Bomber	1978	Prototype	1	
Xian JH-7	China		Fighter bomber	1988	Operational	114+	
Yakovlev Yak-26	USSR		tactical bomber	1956	Prototype	10	
Yakovlev Yak-28	USSR	Jet	Reconnaissance bomber	1958	Retired	1,180	
Yermolayev Yer-2	USSR		Medium bomber	1940	Retired	365 ca.	
Yokosuka B3Y	Japan		Torpedo bomber	1933	Retired	129	
Yokosuka B4Y	Japan		Torpedo bomber	1935	Retired	205	
Yokosuka D4Y	Japan		Dive bomber	1940	Retired	2,038	
Yokosuka E1Y	Japan		Reconnaissance bomber	1923	Retired	320	
Yokosuka P1Y	Japan		Bomber	1943	Retired	1,102	
Zeppelin-Lindau Rs.I	Germany		Maritime patrol flying boat	n/a	prototype destroyed	1	
Zeppelin-Lindau Rs.II	Germany		Maritime patrol flying boat	1916	Prototype	1	
Zeppelin-Lindau Rs.III	Germany		Maritime patrol flying boat	1917	Prototype	1	
Zeppelin-Lindau Rs.IV	Germany		Maritime patrol flying boat	1918	Prototype	1	
Zeppelin-Staaken R.IV	Germany		Heavy bomber	1915	Prototype	1	
Zeppelin-Staaken R.V	Germany		Heavy bomber	1917	Prototype	1	
Zeppelin-Staaken R.VI	Germany		Heavy bomber	1916	Retired	18	
Zeppelin-Staaken R.VII	Germany		Heavy bomber	1917	Prototype	1	
Zeppelin-Staaken R.XIV	Germany		Heavy bomber	1919	Prototype	3	
Zeppelin-Staaken R.XV	Germany		Heavy bomber	1918	Prototype	3	
Zeppelin-Staaken R.XVI	Germany		Heavy bomber	1918	Prototype	3	
Zeppelin-Staaken VGO.I	Germany		Heavy bomber	1915	crashed 1915	1	
Zeppelin-Staaken VGO.II	Germany		Heavy bomber	1915	Prototype	1	
Zeppelin-Staaken VGO.III/R.III	Germany		Heavy bomber	1915	Prototype	1	

== See also ==
- List of fighter aircraft
- List of attack aircraft
- List of torpedo bombers
- List of aircraft of the RAF
- List of Chinese aircraft
- List of military aircraft of France
- List of military aircraft of Germany
- List of military aircraft of the Soviet Union and the CIS
- List of military aircraft of the United States
