= Sopwith Cobham =

British WW1 triplane twin-engine bomber aircraft

Cobham

General information
- Type: Bomber aircraft
- National origin: United Kingdom
- Manufacturer: Sopwith Aviation Company
- Designer: Herbert Smith
- Number built: 3

History
- First flight: April 1919

The Sopwith Cobham was a British twin-engined triplane bomber aircraft designed and built by the Sopwith Aviation Company during the First World War. The only twin-engined aircraft built by Sopwith, the Cobham did not fly until after the end of the war, and was unsuccessful due to the failure of its engines, only three prototypes being built.

== Design and development ==
The Sopwith Cobham was designed to meet a June 1918 requirement for a twin-engined long-range medium bomber to equip the Royal Air Force (to meet RAF Type IV, VI and VII specifications). The design, by Herbert Smith was a twin-engined triplane with a wooden box-girder fuselage with fabric and plywood covering, while the wings, which were of equal span, each had two spruce spars and fabric covering. It was designed to be powered by two of the new ABC Dragonfly radial engines, which promised high power for low installed weight, and had been ordered in large numbers to equip most of the prospective types planned to equip the RAF. It had a crew of three, with a pilot sitting in a cockpit just forward of the leading edge of the wings, while gunners sat in nose and dorsal positions, each armed with Lewis guns on Scarff rings. Three 250 lb (114 kg) bombs could be carried vertically in the fuselage.

Three prototypes were ordered, the only twin-engined aircraft to be built by Sopwith. The first prototype was completed in December 1918, but no Dragonfly engines were available, so it was fitted with 240 hp (179 kW) Siddeley Puma engines to allow flight testing, making its maiden flight in April 1919. It was later re-engined with more-powerful, high compression Pumas, rated at 290 hp (220 kW), being tested at RAF Martlesham Heath in March 1920.

Flight-ready Dragonfly engines were delivered during 1919. As they were heavier than expected, the design had to be modified with the engines mounted further back and the stagger on the wings adjusted. The Dragonfly powered aircraft were also fitted with a larger rudder as a result of experience with the Puma powered aircraft. The two Dragonfly powered prototypes, designated Cobham Mk I (with the Puma-powered first prototype designated Cobham Mk II), flew in January and February 1920. The Dragonfly proved to be extremely unreliable, and development of the engine was stopped in September 1920, leading to the two Dragonfly powered prototypes being discarded. The first prototype did not last much longer, being last flown on 27 January 1921 at the Royal Aircraft Establishment, Farnborough.

== Variants ==
Cobham Mk I
Version powered by 360 hp (269 kW) Dragonfly IA engines. Two built.
Cobham Mk II
First prototype, powered by Siddeley Puma engines. One built.

== Specifications (Cobham II) ==
Data from The British Bomber since 1914

General characteristics

- Crew: 3
- Length: 38 ft (12 m)
- Wingspan: 54 ft (16 m)
- Height: 13 ft (4.0 m)
- Gross weight: 6,300 lb (2,858 kg)
- Powerplant: 2 × Siddeley Puma water-cooled six-cylinder inline engine, 290 hp (220 kW) each

Armament

- Guns: 2× .303 in Lewis gun on Scarff ring in nose and dorsal cockpits
- Bombs: 750 lb (340 kg) bombs carried internally

== See also ==
Aircraft of comparable role, configuration, and era

- de Havilland DH.11 Oxford
- Avro 533 Manchester
- Boulton Paul Bourges
