= Boulton & Paul =

Defunct aircraft manufacturer in Norwich, England

Boulton & Paul Ltd
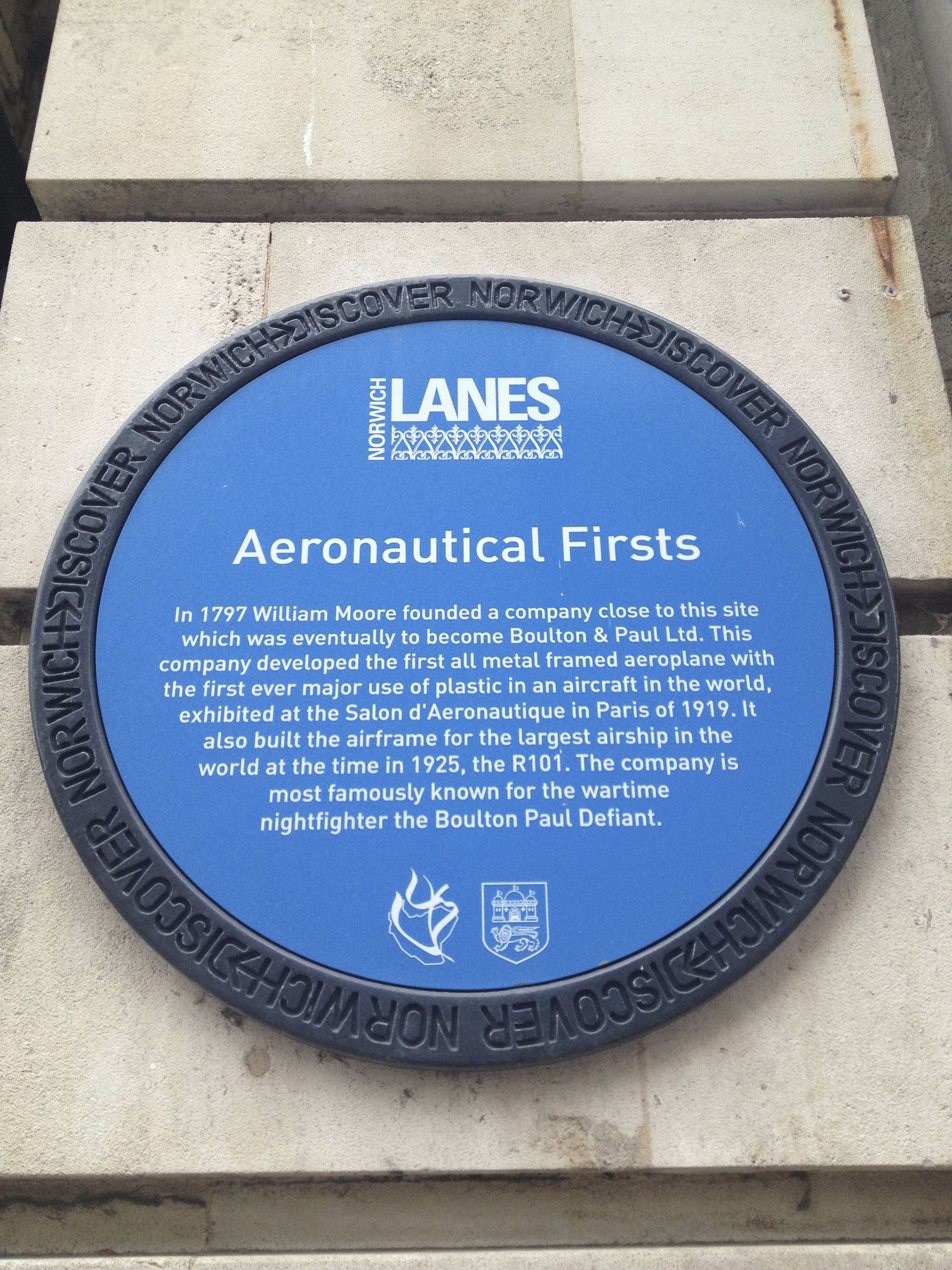
- A blue plaque dedicated to the company in London St, Norwich
- Industry: general manufacturer
- Founded: 1797
- Defunct: 1999
- Fate: Merged and name dropped
- Successor: Jeld Wen Inc.
- Headquarters: Norwich
- Products: Corrugated iron buildings, aircraft
- Subsidiaries: Midland Woodworking Company

Boulton & Paul Ltd was a British general manufacturer from Norwich, England that became involved in aircraft manufacture.

Jeld Wen Inc. bought Boulton & Paul (along with another joinery company John Carr) from the Rugby Group plc in 1999 to form its British subsidiary.

== History ==
The company's origins date back to an ironmonger's shop founded in 1797 in Norwich by William Moore. William Staples Boulton joined the ironworks firm of Moore & Barnard in 1844. By 1870 Boulton had been elevated to a partner alongside of John Barnard and the firm was renamed to Barnard & Boulton. A later partner in the firm was Joseph Paul, and the firm was again renamed to Boulton & Paul Ltd, which started its construction engineering division in 1905. By the early 1900s, Boulton & Paul Ltd had become a successful general manufacturing firm.

During the Second World War it was a major producer of prefabricated buildings, wire netting and wooden sub-assemblies of aircraft. In 1942 the Midland Woodworking Company of Melton Mowbray became a subsidiary. Richard Jewson of the Jewson timber merchants and former Lord Mayor of Norwich was a member of the board until retiring in 1947.

=== Corrugated iron buildings ===
In the 1880s Boulton & Paul were leading manufacturers of kits for corrugated iron buildings, which arrived in packing crates ready to be erected. Woodhall Spa Cottage Museum is a well-preserved example of a Boulton & Paul corrugated building as is the conservatory at Carrow House in Norwich, the former management building at the Colman's mustard works. Monkton Combe School's first cricket pavilion was erected by Boulton & Paul in 1884 and a cost of £50. It was demolished in 1970.

=== Other building types ===
Boulton & Paul was one of the first manufacturers of prefabricated "Residences, Bungalows and Cottages", which they sent to destinations all over the British Empire and South America. Its 1920 catalogue contained a choice of twenty-two designs with several varieties of bungalow illustrated, ranging from the 'Modern Residential', through the 'Week-End' and the 'Seaside' to the plain and ordinary (with verandah).

Many of its buildings are still in use, and include Castle Bungalow at Peppercombe, Devon (a former boathouse which is now a holiday cottage owned by the Landmark Trust) and Monkton Combe School's thatched sports pavilion on Longmead, often referred to as one of the most beautiful cricket pitches in England, which is visible from the A36 in Somerset.

=== Aircraft manufacture ===
In 1915, Boulton & Paul began to construct aircraft under contract, including 550 of the Royal Aircraft Factory FE.2b. Fe.2 construction was passed over to another East Anglian company, so Boulton Paul could concentrate on production of more advanced designs. Their extensive use of jigs and the manufacture of the smaller fittings required meant that they could maintain fast production. A new production site was built and an assembly and proving ground developed on Mousehold Heath in Norwich, rather than transport the aircraft to the Army at Thetford. During the war, the company built more Sopwith Camels than any other manufacturer. Success as a builder of aircraft led to the company forming a design department, but none of its resulting aircraft made a significant impact while the war lasted. The P.3 Bobolink fighter was overshadowed by the Sopwith Snipe and the Armistice came before the P.7 Bourges bomber into production.

Boulton & Paul developed steel-framed aircraft under their designer John Dudley North. The first was the Boulton & Paul P.10 which used steel tubes rolled from sheet metal. It was exhibited – but not flown – at the Paris Air Show in 1919. Official interest in metal frame designs led to an order of a single Boulton & Paul Bolton, a twin-engine bomber design. In the same period, Boulton & Paul produced another metal framed design, the Boulton & Paul Bodmin, with its engines in the fuselage. North believed that a metal frame could be 10% lighter than an equivalent wooden frame.

After World War I, Boulton & Paul made its mark with the introduction of powered and enclosed defensive machine-gun turrets for bombers. Its Sidestrand twin-engined biplane bomber, which could fly at 140 mph, had an exposed nose turret that was clearly inadequate. The subsequent Overstrand bomber featured the world's first enclosed, power-operated turret, mounting a single Lewis gun and propelled by compressed air. The company licensed a French design of an electro-hydraulic four-gun turret that became a major feature of its future production. In addition to fitting turrets to bombers, Boulton & Paul was to install them in fighters.

Boulton & Paul provided most of the structure for the R101 airship; the completed sections being transported to RAF Cardington for assembly there. The R101 subsequently flew over Norwich in return.

In a depressed market in 1934, the aircraft division being its weakest, Boulton & Paul Ltd sold its aircraft manufacturing component from the main construction business to create Boulton Paul Aircraft Ltd. This moved to Wolverhampton in 1936 as the area had a surplus of skilled labour and the council was able to provide an incentive in the form of a greenfield site and flying rights. In 1961 Boulton Paul Aircraft, by now a producer of aircraft equipment rather than complete aircraft, merged with the Dowty Group to form first Dowty Boulton Paul Ltd and then Dowty Aerospace.

== Boulton Paul aircraft at Norwich ==
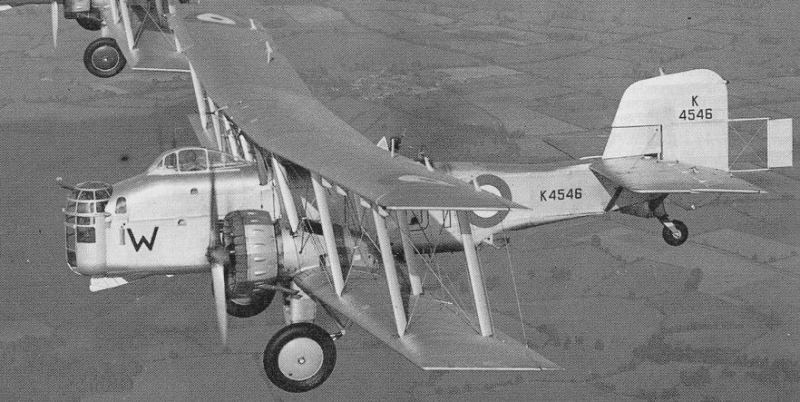
Boulton Paul Overstrand bomber

First flight date shown

- Boulton Paul P.3 Bobolink 1918
- Boulton Paul P.6 1918
- Boulton Paul P.7 Bourges 1918
- Boulton Paul Atlantic 1919
- Boulton Paul P.9 1919
- Boulton Paul P.10 1919
- Boulton Paul Bolton 1922
- Boulton Paul Bugle 1923
- Boulton Paul Bodmin 1924
- Boulton Paul P.29 Sidestrand 1926 – bomber
- Boulton Paul P.31 Bittern 1927
- Boulton Paul Partridge 1928
- Boulton Paul Phoenix 1929
- Boulton Paul P.32 1931
- Boulton Paul P.75 Overstrand 1933 – bomber
- Boulton Paul P.64 Mailplane 1933
- Boulton Paul P.71A 1934

== See also ==
- Boulton Paul Aircraft
- Mann Egerton
- Matthew Boulton
- Matthew Robinson Boulton
