= Boulton Paul Bourges =

Bourges

General information
- Type: day bomber, long-range reconnaissance
- National origin: United Kingdom
- Manufacturer: Boulton & Paul
- Designer: John Dudley North
- Status: Prototype
- Number built: 3

History
- First flight: 1918

The Boulton & Paul P.7 Bourges was a prototype British twin-engined biplane day bomber built by Boulton & Paul to replace the Airco DH.10 Amiens. Despite demonstrating excellent performance and manoeuvrability, only three prototypes were built, post World War I cost cutting leading to the DH.10 not being replaced.

== Development and design ==
In 1918, the British Air Ministry drew up specification A.2 (B) for the replacement of the Airco DH.10 Amiens medium bomber, despite the fact that the Amiens had not yet entered service. In response, J.D North, chief designer of Boulton & Paul's aircraft department designed a twin-engined aircraft, the P.7 Bourges, powered, like most of the types designed to replace the DH.10, by two of the new ABC Dragonfly radial engines. The ABC was ordered off the drawing board by the Ministry and high hopes were held for it. The Bourges was a three-seat, three bay biplane with unstaggered wings of all-wooden construction. The armament was two Lewis guns - one in the nose on a Scarff ring and the other in the dorsal position - and 900 lb (410 kg) of bombs in three bomb cells with doors.

Three prototypes were ordered by the Air Ministry.

Delays in delivery of airworthy examples of the Dragonfly led to the decision to fit the first prototype with the much less powerful 230 hp (170 kW)), but reliable Bentley BR2 rotary engine as a temporary measure, allowing a first flight as the Bourges Mk IIA in June 1919.

Frank Courtney demonstrated the Bourges at Hendon Aerodrome at the end of May 1919 for a reception for Commander Albert Read who had led the crossing of the Atlantic by US seaplanes. The magazine Flight commenting on its aerobatic capabilities and general performance though having already flown about 3,500 miles.

It was fitted with Dragonflys in July, becoming the Bourges Mk IA,. Both the Bentley and ABC engined Bourges demonstrated excellent performance and manoeuvrability, being able to be looped and rolled with ease. Courtney wrote that it could "be thrown around in loops, spins, rolls...without any special effort". This acrobatic quality was displayed for the reception at Hendon of Commander Read after his cross-Atlantic crossing by flying boat.

The second aircraft was fitted with a gulled upper wing to improve the field of fire for its gunners - the engines moved down to the top of the lower wing. To give greater clearance for the propellers, the undercarriage was lengthened. Fitted with Dragonflys, it was designated the Bourges Mk IB. It would crash in 1919 and its structure reused for a different project. The third Bourges was also originally built as a Mk IB, but when Boulton Paul realised that the reliability problems with the Dragonfly could not be cured, it was refitted with BR2s, being redesignated Bourges Mk IIB.

In 1920-21 the third prototype, the Bourges P.7B F2905 was again re-engined, this time with 450 hp (336 kW) Napier Lion engines fitted onto the lower wing, and was flown both with the original straight upper wing (Bourges Mk IIIA) and with the gulled wing (Bourges Mk IIIB). While, in this form, it was superior to the other types planned as DH.10 replacements, the RAF had by this time abandoned the requirement, and the Bourges was used for extensive testing at the Royal Aircraft Establishment, Farnborough continuing in use until 1924. On one occasion it was used at a public display at Croydon in a mock dogfight with two Nieuport Nighthawk fighters.

The second prototype was rebuilt to produce the Boulton Paul Atlantic.

== Specifications (Bourges ) ==
Data from British Aeroplanes 1914-18.

General characteristics

- Crew: Three
- Length: 37 ft 0 in (11.28 m)
- Wingspan: 57 ft 4 in (17.48 m)
- Height: 12 ft 0 in (3.66 m)
- Wing area: 738 sq ft (68.6 m^{2})
- Airfoil: RAF-15
- Empty weight: 3,820 lb (1,733 kg)
- Gross weight: 6,326 lb (2,869 kg)
- Fuel capacity: 190 imp gal (230 US gal; 860 L)
- Powerplant: 2 × ABC Dragonfly I 9-cylinder air-cooled radial engine, 320 hp (240 kW) each

Performance

- Maximum speed: 123.5 mph (198.8 km/h, 107.3 kn) at 6,500 ft (2,000 m)
- Endurance: 9 hr 15 min
- Service ceiling: 20,000 ft (6,100 m)
- Time to altitude: 25 min 25 s to 15,000 ft (4,600 m)

Armament

- Guns: 1 or 2 × .303 in (7.7 mm) Lewis guns each in nose and mid-upper positions
- Bombs: 4× 230 lb (100 kg)

== See also ==
Related development

- Boulton & Paul Bolton
- Boulton & Paul Bugle
- Boulton Paul Atlantic

Aircraft of comparable role, configuration, and era

- Avro 533 Manchester
- de Havilland Oxford
- Sopwith Cobham
- Airco DH.10 Amiens
