= Boulton Paul Atlantic =

Atlantic
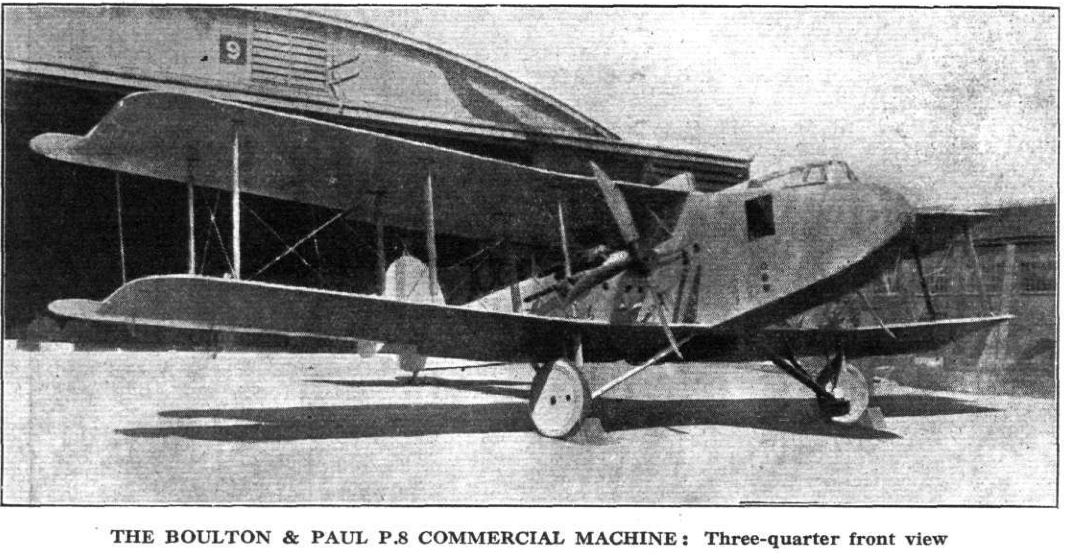
- Boulton Paul P.8

General information
- Type: Prototype airliner and cross Atlantic challenger
- National origin: United Kingdom
- Manufacturer: Boulton & Paul Ltd
- Designer: John North
- Number built: 2

History
- First flight: 10 May 1920

The Boulton & Paul P.8 Atlantic was Boulton & Paul's attempt to adapt their well-performing Bourges bomber into an airliner. They hoped to gain publicity for it by winning the outstanding prize for the first non-stop Atlantic crossing but a first flight accident made them miss their opportunity. Two were built but none sold as airliners.

== Design and development ==
Orders for military aircraft ended in 1918 with the First World War and the outlook for manufacturers considering the commercial market was made more gloomy by the large number of war surplus aircraft available. The publicity associated with the first non-stop Atlantic crossing, which came with the additional bonus of the £10,000 prize for the first such flight by a British aircraft on offer by the Daily Mail since before the war, was sought by many companies. Thus in late 1918 and early 1919 the Alliance Aeroplane Company, Boulton & Paul, Fairey Aviation Company, Handley Page, Martinsyde, Short Brothers, Sopwith and Vickers Ltd were preparing competitors. The P.8 Atlantic was Boulton & Paul's entrant and was also intended to be the prototype for an airliner.

The Atlantic had some similarity to the earlier Boulton & Paul Bourges and indeed some structural commonality, for the Bourges Mk 1B was cannibalised to produce the first of two Atlantics. Though Boulton & Paul were beginning to think about metal framed aircraft, the Atlantic was traditionally built from wood, albeit with many metal fittings and joints. It was a three-bay twin-engined biplane with wings that were neither staggered nor swept and were of parallel chord, though the lower wing was narrower than the upper. Ailerons were fitted on both wings and as on the Bourges their horn balances projected beyond the wingtips. The two 450 hp (336 kW) Napier Lion water-cooled engines were mounted on top of the lower wings just inside the innermost interplane struts. They were cooled with a retractable radiator mounted under the fuselage between the undercarriage legs. The fin and horn balanced rudder had a near-circular profile, but the tailplane was quite rectangular, carrying unbalanced elevators. The tailplane incidence was adjustable from the cockpit for trim and there was a pair of ancillary fins mounted on the tailplane to hold the aircraft straight when flying on one engine. The fins could be rotated from the cockpit and locked to cope with the asymmetry.

The lower part of the fuselage was built on the same four longerons as in the Bourges, giving it a rectangular look, but the upper part was built up with fairings so that the fuselage entirely filled the gap between the wings. Needing no gunner's position, the nose of the Atlantic was rounded off. Above it and in front of the wings the pilot's cockpit was, unusually for its day enclosed with a canopy, giving him an excellent protected view. In the first prototype, the machine intended for the Atlantic crossing attempt, there was a windowed cabin immediately behind the cockpit with positions for a radio operator and navigator, one of whom could also act as relief pilot. Behind them the fuselage was filled with six fuel tanks holding 800 Imperial gallons (3.64 m^{3}) giving a design range of 3,850 miles (6,195 km). In an emergency the fuel could be dumped in 75 s and the empty tanks would help the aircraft float.

Any aircraft fuelled to fly the Atlantic was going to be heavy and undercarriage design was critical, as Martinsyde found to their cost. The Atlantic used a split axle arrangement: on each side the short main leg extended from below the forward and innermost interplane strut. There was a second member back to below the aft interplane strut and an axle from the large single wheel upwards and inwards, hinged to the lower fuselage longeron. Shocks were absorbed by a combination of oleo-pneumatic and bungee elastic components. At 21 ft 0 in (6.40 m) the track was very wide.

The Atlantic had several features which fitted it for the crossing attempt. Like the Bourges, it handled well and could be trimmed to fly almost hands off, with only minor rudder nudges to hold direction. It was even possible, with the use of a cockpit lever to lock the elevators and ailerons and at the same time transfer rudder control to the wheel that normally operated the ailerons. Its cruising speed of 116 mph (187 km/h) was considerably higher than its competitors. After using two hours worth of fuel it could maintain height on one engine alone, or equivalently hold altitude on half power with two engines.

There was great pressure on all teams in early 1919 and the company's management had assembled a large group to observe the first flight which probably led to the disastrous first flight of the Atlantic in April. The Boulton & Paul test pilot Frank Courtney had run up each engine to full power, but separately, not together. Just after take-off one engine failed and the Atlantic crashed with heavy damage though happily leaving Courtney unharmed. It turned out that there was a fuel fault which only acted when full flow to both engines was required. Work on a second Atlantic began using what they could of the second Bourges which had crashed and Boulton & Paul immediately began to adapt it for the crossing. Before they could complete it, John Alcock and Arthur Whitten Brown had made the first non-stop Atlantic crossing in their Vickers Vimy on 14–15 June 1919 and Boulton & Paul abandoned their preparations.

The company had always seen the second Atlantic as a promising airliner prototype and returned to this project. It first flew on 10 May 1920, bearing the civil registration G-EAPE. It was never fitted out as an airliner, Boulton & Paul realising that different companies might want different layouts, but a separate fuselage mock-up was built and artists' impressions had been released earlier. Knowing that some pilots preferred open cockpits, Boulton & Paul offered a choice of canopy or simple windscreen. The "Commercial" as it was sometimes known had windowed cabins for three in front of the wing and another for four behind. The cabins had two separate external doors. In between and below the wing the 100 Imperial gallons (0.45 m^{3}) fuel tank was fixed in the upper part of the fuselage, partly to minimise trim changes and partly to allow the engines to be gravity fed. Despite the safety features provided by the two engines and the Atlantic's ability to hold altitude on one, plus its high cruising speed and (non-fuel) disposable load of 1,870 lb (848 kg), economics were against it when competing with the single Lion powered de Havilland DH.18 which carried eight rather than seven passengers. Although 6 were planned, no orders came and no more Atlantics were built.

== Specifications ==
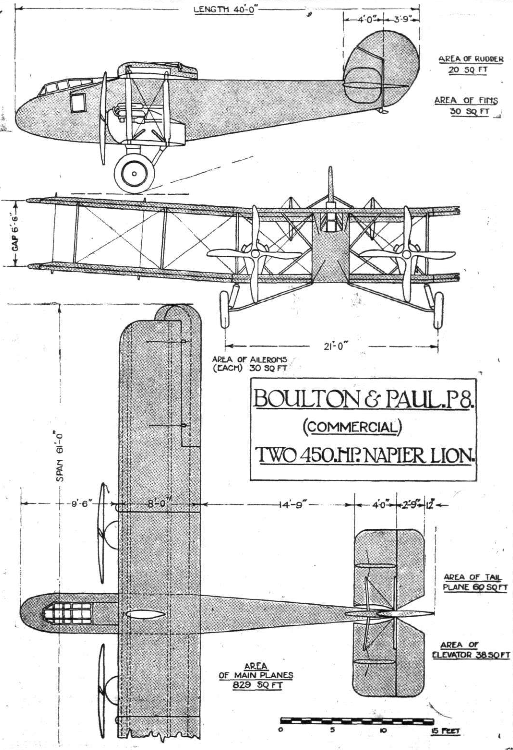
Boulton and Paul P.8

Data from

General characteristics

- Crew: 3 (pilot, 2× relief pilot/navigator/radio operator)
- Length: 40 ft 0 in (12.19 m)
- Wingspan: 60 ft 4 in (18.39 m)
- Height: 12 ft 4 in (3.76 m)
- Wing area: 770 sq ft (72 m^{2})
- Empty weight: 5,710 lb (2,590 kg)
- Gross weight: 7,880 lb (3,574 kg)
- Powerplant: 2 × Napier Lion W-12 watercooled piston engines, 450 hp (340 kW) each

Performance

- Maximum speed: 149 mph (240 km/h, 129 kn) at sea level
- Cruise speed: 116 mph (187 km/h, 101 kn)
- Service ceiling: 25,000 ft (7,600 m)
- Time to altitude: 15 min to 15,000 ft (4,600 m)

== See also ==
Related development

- Boulton Paul Bourges
