= Airco DH.11 Oxford =

DH.11 Oxford
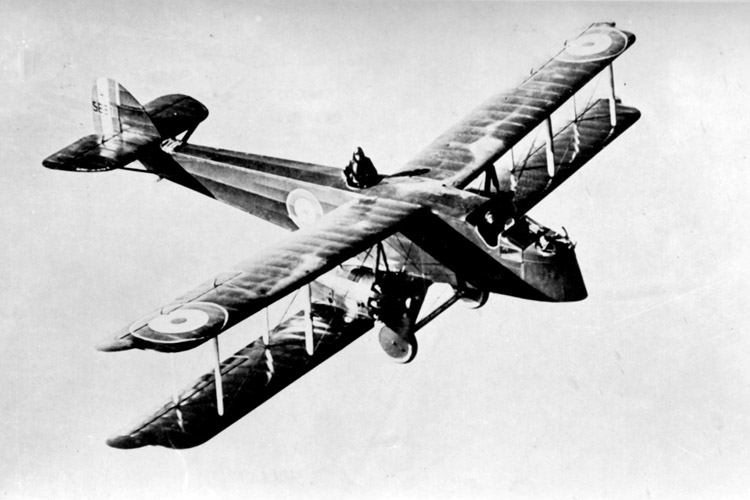

General information
- Type: Bomber
- Manufacturer: Airco
- Designer: Geoffrey de Havilland
- Status: Abandoned
- Number built: One

History
- First flight: January 1919
- Developed from: Airco DH.10 Amiens

The Airco DH.11 Oxford (later de Havilland) was a British twin-engined biplane bomber which was designed to replace the earlier Airco DH.10 Amiens. It was designed to use the unsuccessful ABC Dragonfly engine and was abandoned after the first prototype was built.

== Development ==
The DH.11 Oxford was designed by Geoffrey de Havilland for the Aircraft Manufacturing Company as a twin-engined day bomber to replace the Airco DH.10 Amiens. It was designed (as required by the Specification) to use the ABC Dragonfly radial engine which promised to give excellent performance and had been ordered in large numbers to be the powerplant for most of the new types on order for the Royal Air Force. The DH.11 was a twin-engined biplane, with all-wood construction and three-bay wings. It had an aerodynamically clean, deep fuselage occupying the whole wing gap, giving a good field of fire for the gunners in the nose and mid-upper positions.

The first prototype flew in January 1919, powered by two 320 hp (239 kW) Dragonfly engines. The prototype encountered handling problems, and was handicapped by the Dragonfly engines, which were extremely unreliable, being prone to overheating and excessive vibration, while not delivering the expected power. Two further prototypes were cancelled in 1919, with no aircraft in the end being purchased to replace the DH.10.

== Variants ==
- Oxford Mk I – Prototype – powered by two 320 hp (240 kW) ABC Dragonfly engines – one built.
- Oxford Mk II – Proposed version with two 300 hp (220 kW) Siddeley Puma engines – not built.
- DH.12 – Proposed version with Dragonfly engines and modified gunner's position – not built.

== Specifications (Oxford Mk I) ==
Data from The British Bomber since 1914

General characteristics

- Crew: 3
- Length: 45 ft 2 3/4 in (13.786 m)
- Wingspan: 60 ft 2 in (18.34 m)
- Height: 13 ft 6 in (4.11 m)
- Wing area: 719 sq ft (66.8 m^{2})
- Empty weight: 4,105 lb (1,862 kg)
- Max takeoff weight: 7,027 lb (3,187 kg)
- Powerplant: 2 × ABC Dragonfly air-cooled 9-cylinder radial engines, 320 hp (240 kW) each
- Propellers: 2-bladed wood fixed pitch propellers

Performance

- Maximum speed: 123 mph (198 km/h, 107 kn) at sea level, 116 mph (187 km/h) at 10,000 ft (3,000 m)
- Endurance: 3 hr
- Service ceiling: 14,500 ft (4,400 m)
- Time to altitude: 13 min 45 s to 10,000 ft (3,000 m)

Armament

- Guns: 1 × .303 in (7.7 mm) Lewis gun at Scarff rings at both nose and midships gunners cockpits
- Bombs: 4 × 230 lb (100 kg) bombs internally

== See also ==
- 1919 in aviation

Related development

- Airco DH.10 Amiens

Aircraft of comparable role, configuration, and era

- Avro 533 Manchester
- Nieuport London
- Vickers Vimy

Related lists

- List of bomber aircraft
- List of aircraft of the Royal Air Force
