= Boulton Paul Bolton =

Bolton
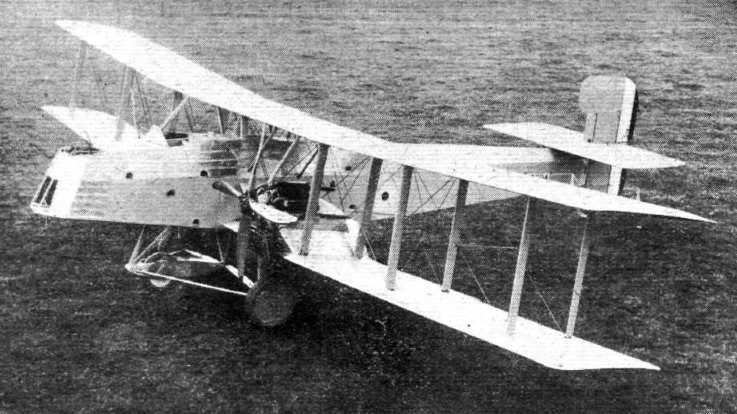

General information
- Type: Long-range reconnaissance biplane
- National origin: United Kingdom
- Manufacturer: Boulton & Paul Ltd
- Designer: John North
- Number built: 1

History
- First flight: September 1922

The Boulton & Paul P.15 Bolton was a one-off experimental twin-engined reconnaissance biplane ordered by the Air Ministry to sustain Boulton & Paul's development of steel-framed aircraft early in the 1920s. It was the RAF's first metal-framed aircraft.

== Design and development ==
Just after the end of the World War I the Air Ministry were keen to explore the use of all-steel airframes, partly because during the war spruce stocks had been seriously reduced. They were aware of Boulton & Paul's all-steel-framed, though probably unflown P.10 and the claims of the company designer, John North that such aircraft could be 10% lighter than their wooden-framed equivalents and that metal construction was better suited to British climate. They therefore issued specification 4/20 for a steel-framed version of the Boulton Paul Bourges twin-engined reconnaissance bomber and ordered one prototype, so that Boulton & Paul could continue to develop such structures. The P.15 Bolton was the result. Despite its later type number, the Bolton was ordered and flew before the more unusual but equally steel-framed P.12 Bodmin. Thus the sole Bolton, serial J6584 was the first metal-framed aircraft developed for the Royal Air Force.

The metal tubes that formed the structure were made from rolling steel strip and locking it in a folded bead to form the seam. Together with careful heat treatment of the steel strip, strong straight tubes could be produced. This method was considered sufficiently important that Air Ministry wanted it kept secret.

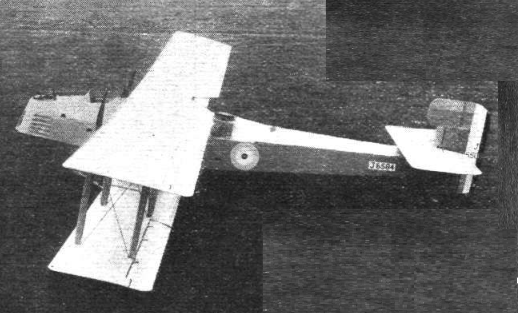

In general terms the Bolton was similar to the Bourges, though larger all round; both were twin-engined, three bay biplanes with equal span, constant chord wings with no sweep or stagger. Both carried ailerons on upper and lower wings, though the wingtips of the Bolton were cut off square in the later Boulton & Paul fashion and lacked the protruding balances of the earlier machine. The interplane struts were quite wide chord, their twin triangular members covered in fabric. There were supporting sloping struts from the midpoints of the wing midsection to the upper fuselage longerons. The two 450 hp (336 kW) Napier Lion engines were mounted just inboard of the inner interplane struts, not directly onto the lower wing but rather on (for the top part of the engine was uncovered for air cooling) a little nacelle which had at the front and below the propeller boss, a small radiator. Four-bladed propellers were fitted.

The Bolton's fuselage was square sided except behind the wings where an extra central member made the upper section triangular. This was done to enhance the downward field of fire from the dorsal position. The pilot's cockpit was forward of the wings and in the nose there was another gunner's position. This crew member doubled as bomb-aimer from a windowed position slightly further forward in the lower fuselage, in a nose that looked much like that of the Bodmin. The tailplane was mounted at the top of the fuselage, with a fin and rudder that projected below the fuselage, protected by a tailskid. The rudder had a large horn balance that overhung the fin and its unusual forward extension that acted as a trimming surface. The single axle undercarriage was of much narrower track than that of the Bourges, mounted just inboard of the engines on pneumatically sprung and damped legs in the manner of the Bodmin. A pair of members converged from the legs to a single forward wheel, there to prevent nose-overs.

The Bolton first flew, piloted by Frank Courtney in September 1922. Its career and performance remain largely hidden by official secrecy, though an estimated maximum speed of 130 mph (209 km/h) at 10,000 ft (3,048 m) did emerge. It was listed in a review of British aircraft by Flight in May 1924, some 20 months after the first flight but no description was given of it or other recent aircraft from the firm due to them being considered "secret" by the Air Ministry. Nonetheless, Boulton & Paul's growing expertise in metal-framed twin-engined aircraft was rewarded by orders for seven Bugles and led to the Sidestrands and Overstrands that achieved squadron service, albeit in small numbers.

== Specifications ==
Data from

General characteristics

- Crew: 3 (pilot and 2 gunners)
- Length: 48 ft 0 in (14.63 m)
- Wingspan: 62 ft 6 in (19.05 m)
- Gross weight: 9,500 lb (4,309 kg)
- Powerplant: 2 × Napier Lion 12-cylinder water-cooled broad-arrow engines, 450 hp (340 kW) each

Performance

- Maximum speed: 130 mph (210 km/h, 110 kn) at 10,000 ft (3,000 m)

Armament

- Guns: 1× 0.303 in (7.7 mm) Vickers machine guns on Scarff rings in nose and dorsal positions
- Bombs: 4× 230 lb (100 kg) bombs
