= Nieuport London =

London
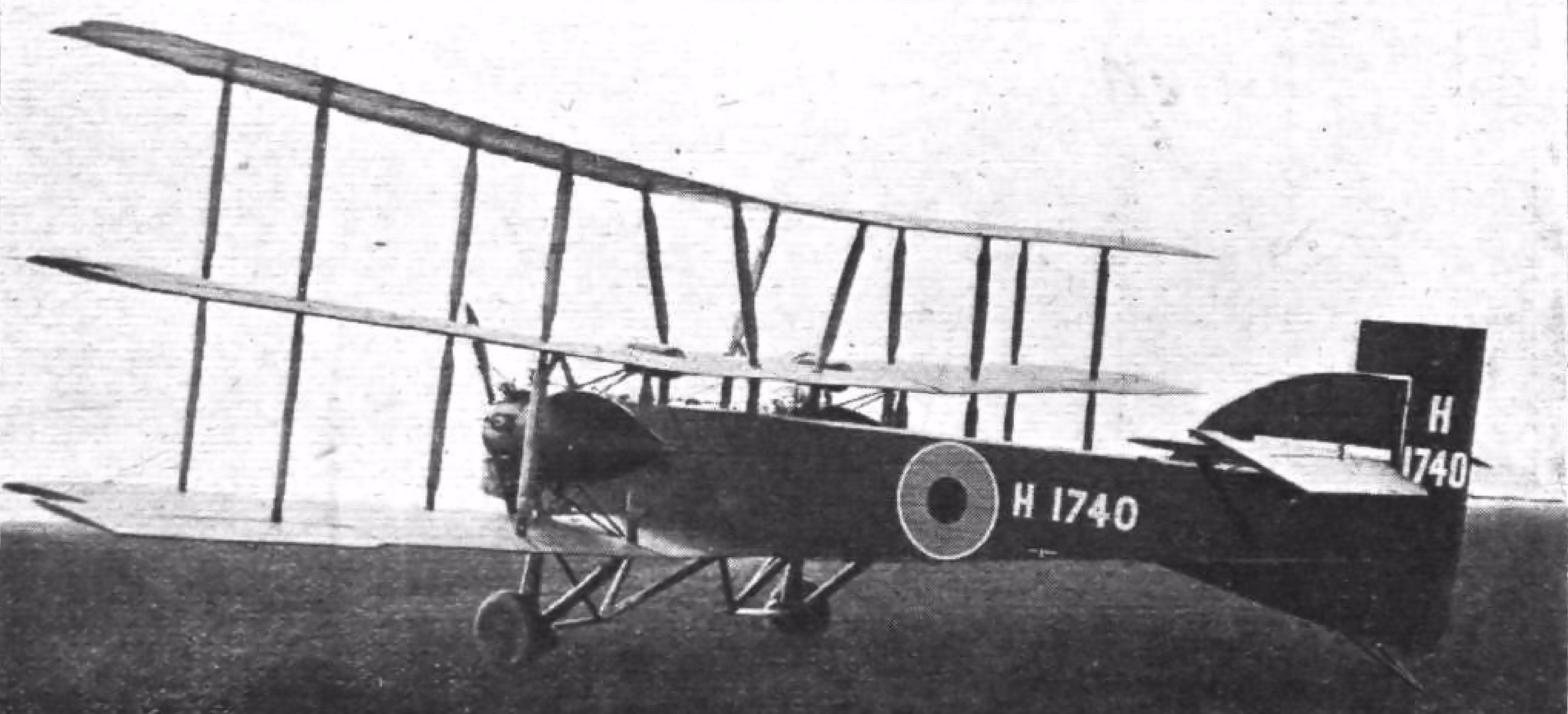

General information
- Type: Bomber
- Manufacturer: Nieuport & General Aircraft
- Designer: Henry Folland
- Status: abandoned prototype
- Number built: 2

History
- First flight: 13 April 1920

The Nieuport London was a British night bomber aircraft designed in the First World War. A twin-engined triplane, the London was dogged by the unavailability and unreliability of its engines, and did not fly until 1920. Only two were built.

== Development and design ==
In 1918, Henry Folland, chief designer of the Nieuport (England) Ltd (later to become the Nieuport & General Aircraft Co Ltd.), formerly of the Royal Aircraft Factory and designer of the S.E.5, designed the Nieuport London to meet the RAF Type VII specification for a night bomber, an order for six Londons was placed in July 1918.

The London was a twin-engined triplane with equal span, two-bay wings, powered by the new ABC Dragonfly radial engine. It was designed for ease of production, and was built of wood with use of metal fittings minimised. The angular fuselage was covered by ¼ inch (6 mm) thick wooden boarding joined by Tongue and groove joints, techniques more usually found in furniture manufacture. The fabric covered wings were unstaggered and had ailerons fitted to each wing, while the tail unit had a prominent ventral fin similar to that fitted to Folland's S.E.5 and Nighthawk fighters. Bombload was 2,250 lb (1,023 kg), while as the London was solely intended to operate by night, defensive armament was limited to a pair of Lewis guns in the nose.

The end of the First World War meant that the needs of the RAF for heavy bombers could be met by the existing Vickers Vimy, and the last four Londons were cancelled in December 1918. Despite the great expectations placed on the Dragonfly, which had been ordered into large scale production prior to testing being carried out, and formed the powerplant for many of the types planned to equip the Royal Air Force of 1919, the engine was disappointing, with the prototype Londons being delayed by many months before engines were delivered, with the first eventually flying on 13 April 1920, followed by the second in July. Despite its simple structure and angular lines, handling proved excellent, it being possible to remove the ailerons from the lower two sets of wings while not adversely affecting control. Although Folland had designed a civil transport version capable of carrying 13 passengers or heavy loads of cargo or mail, Nieuport and General closed down in August 1920, ending development of the London.

== Specifications ==
Data from The British Bomber since 1914

General characteristics

- Crew: Two
- Length: 37 ft 6 in (11.43 m)
- Wingspan: 59 ft 6 in (18.14 m)
- Height: 17 ft 6 in (5.33 m)
- Wing area: 1,100 sq ft (100 m^{2})
- Airfoil: RAF 15
- Empty weight: 4,380 lb (1,987 kg)
- Gross weight: 8,650 lb (3,924 kg)
- Fuel capacity: 175 imp gal (210 US gal; 800 L)
- Powerplant: 2 × ABC Dragonfly I nine-cylinder radial engines, 320 hp (240 kW) each
- Propellers: 2-bladed wood fixed pitch propellers

Performance

- Maximum speed: 100 mph (160 km/h, 87 kn) at sea level
- Endurance: 4 hr
- Service ceiling: 18,000 ft (5,500 m)
- Time to altitude: 30 min to 10,000 ft (3,000 m)

Armament

- Guns: 2 x .303 in (7.7 mm) Lewis guns on Scarff ring in nose
- Bombs: 9 x 250 lb (110 kg) bombs or equivalent

== See also ==
- 1920 in aviation

Aircraft of comparable role, configuration, and era

- Airco DH.10 Amiens
- Vickers Vimy

Related lists

- List of bomber aircraft
