= Harbin H-7 =

Proposed Chinese aircraft

H-7

General information
- Type: Medium bomber
- National origin: People's Republic of China
- Manufacturer: Harbin Aircraft Manufacturing Corporation
- Designer: Harbin Aircraft Manufacturing Corporation
- Status: Cancelled
- Primary user: People's Liberation Army Air Force

History
- Developed from: Harbin H-5

The Harbin H-7 (Chinese: 轰-7; pinyin: Hōng-7) was a Chinese bomber proposed by Harbin Aircraft Manufacturing Corporation in 1965 and a possible successor to the two-engine Harbin H-5 jet bomber. The project was canceled in early 1970s before the bomber went into production.
