= Boulton Paul Bugle =

Bugle
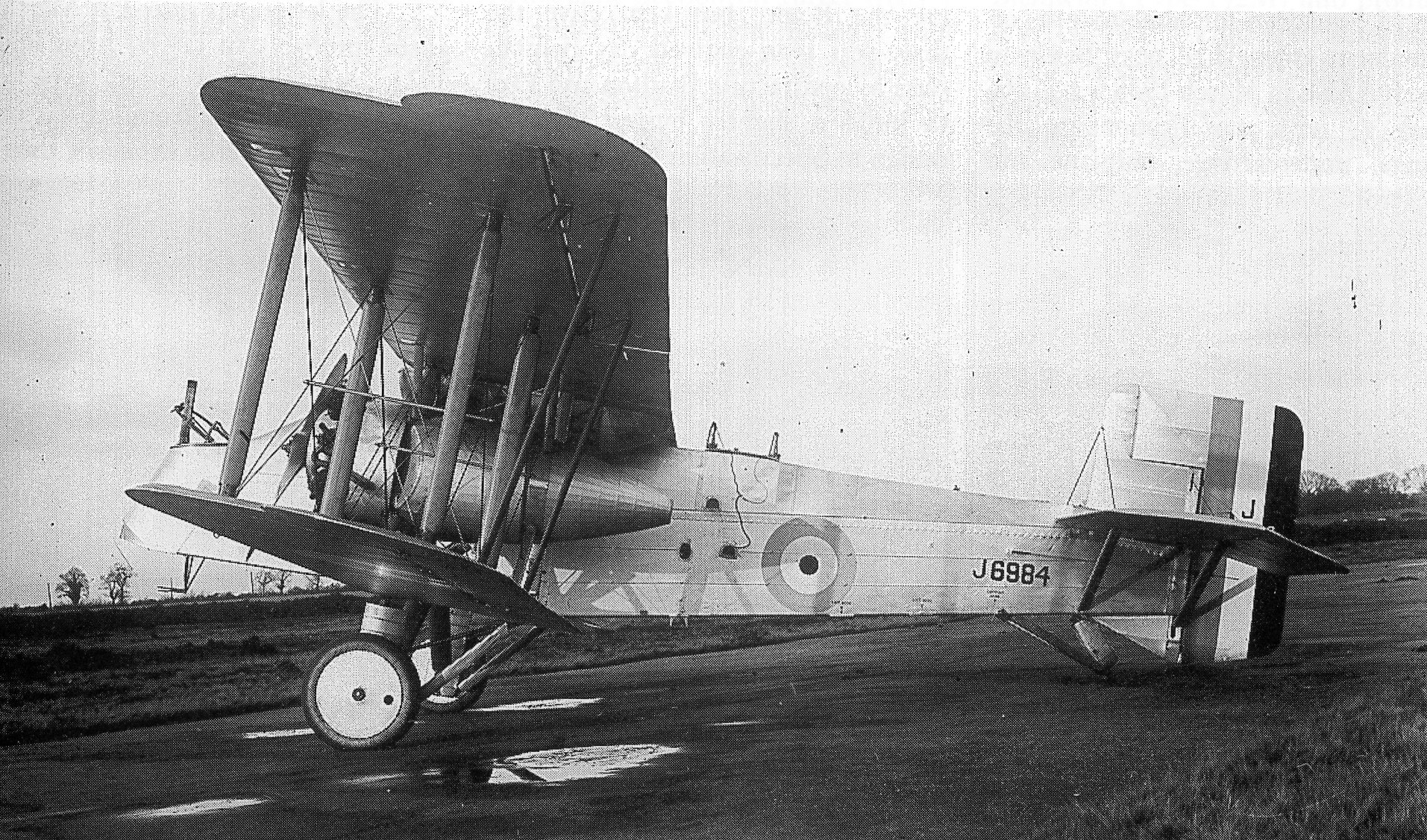

General information
- Type: Heavy bomber
- National origin: Britain
- Manufacturer: Boulton & Paul
- Number built: Seven

History
- First flight: 30 June 1923

The Boulton & Paul Bugle was a heavy bomber designed and produced by the British manufacturing group Boulton & Paul.

There were two variants; the Bugle I with 400 hp (298 kW) Bristol Jupiter II radial engines (five built) and the Napier Lion W-block Bugle II (two built)

== Development ==
Work on what would become the Bugle effectively commenced at Boulton & Paul following the Air Ministry's release of Specification 30/22, which sought a new twin-engined heavy bomber to equip the Royal Air Force (RAF). However, this effort was not a clean-sheet design, as it drew extensively on the company's existing experiences with aircraft such as the Boulton Paul Bolton and Boulton & Paul Bourges. The new design actually shared its basic configuration with the preceding Bourges, which had been developed during the final months of the First World War with positive results, but had been terminated prior to procurement as a part of the rapidly implemented military cutbacks made after the conflict's end.

The Air Ministry was suitably interested in the proposal that a pair of prototypes, J6984 and J6985, were ordered for evaluation purposes. In response to an Air Ministry directive which forbid the placement of fuel tanks within the fuselage, fuel was instead accommodated within semi-circular tanks hung beneath the upper wing's inner bay area. The engines, which were initially a pair of Bristol Jupiter II air-cooled radial engines, each capable of producing up to 400 hp (298 kW), were housed within streamlined nacelles that had a patented hinged mounting, which was designed so that the engines could be swung out of situ while on the ground for ease of maintenance.

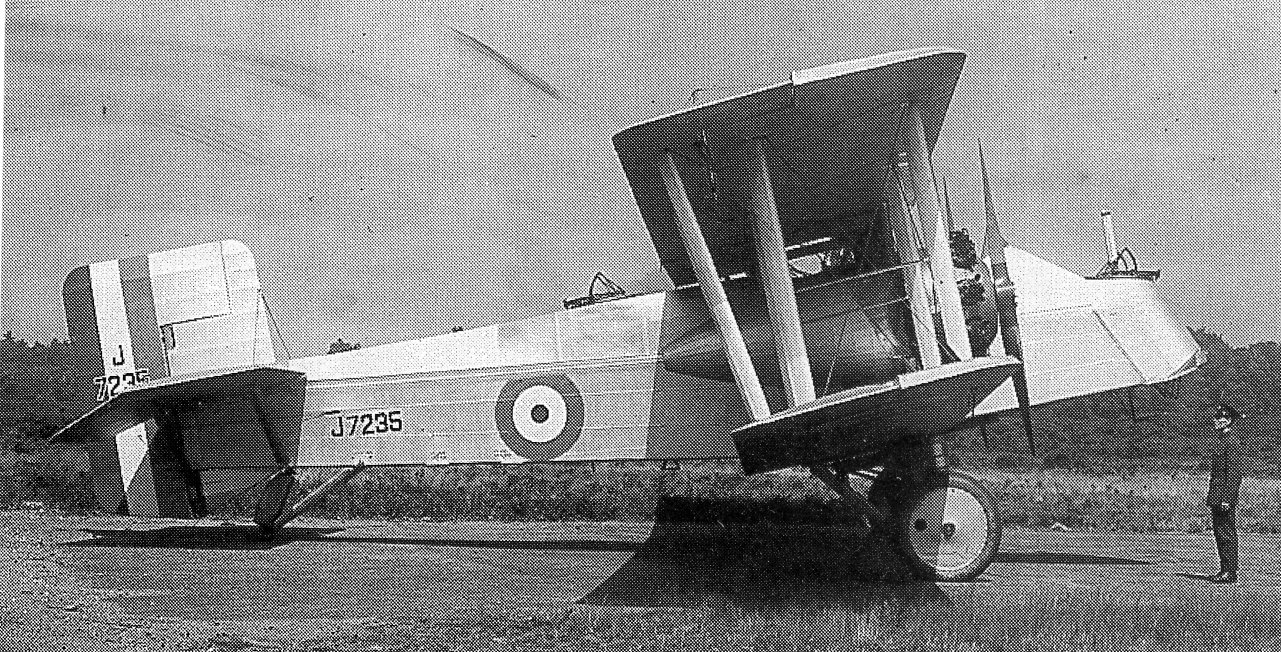
The third Bugle

The structural elements of the Bugle were primarily composed of steel, with some portions being corrugated for additional strength, while the exterior had a fabric covering. The interplane strut design, which was a patented feature at that time, used a combination of steel inner struts and duralumin outer ones, while the removable fairings were made of wood. This use of light alloys in some of the secondary structural members represented a loosening of formerly negative attitudes on the part of the Air Ministry towards the use of such materials.

The fuselage was rectangular in shape, its frame formed from four longerons and built in two sections. Struts and bracing wires alike attached to an angle plane, which was attached to the fuselage via bearings. The dorsal fuselage featured a single gun turret, to the rear of which the fuselage tapered inwards in a triangular fashion as to maximise the gunner's downwards field of fire. The position of the gunners were deliberately lower than that of the pilot's cockpit, giving the latter a favourable level of visibility. The aircraft's nose gunner also acted as the bomb-aimer, and was provided with separate rudder controls to the pilot to make minor adjustments during bombing runs; all of the bombs were stored externally on four bomb rails, two attached to the lower longerons and two fitted underneath the lower wings.

The undercarriage and tailskid both were furnished with oleo-pneumatic shock absorbers, while main wheels akin to that of the Bourges were fitted. Additional dampening was provided via a pair of tubes fitted with coil springs attached to the main landing gear. During the type's taxiing trials, the aircraft proved to be more stable than its immediate preceding designs. The rudder was equipped with a locking device as to better handle asymmetric flight conditions, such as single-engine operations. Unlike the company's earlier designs, the aircraft's four ailerons were actuated via struts rather than cables.

On 30 June 1923, the first prototype performed the type's maiden flight, piloted by Frank Courtney. The second prototype conducted its own maiden flight later that same year. During 1924, a third aircraft equipped with more powerful Bristol Jupiter IV engines, appeared; other changes on this aircraft included a four-seat configuration, a slightly reduced wingspan, and increased fuel capacity. In 1925, service trials commenced with the third aircraft, facing off against the competing Vickers Virginia, during which the former exhibited its considerably greater manoeuvrability and higher top speed in comparison to the latter.

It was during 1925 that the first of the improved Bugle IIs appeared, which was powered by a pair of Napier Lion engines, each capable of 450 hp, in place of the Jupiter engines. It also featured numerous refinements to the design, including a greater degree of streamlining and a slightly elevated all-up weight. Despite the type having demonstrated exceptional maneuverability and good performance in general, aviation historian Alec Brew observed that constrained budgets had prevented a production order from being placed for the Bugle. Instead, the Air Ministry pursued a policy of continuing to order increasingly advanced prototypes across a range of manufacturers as to foster innovation and advancement in industry, as well as readiness to put such designs into quantity production should a military need arise.

== Variants ==
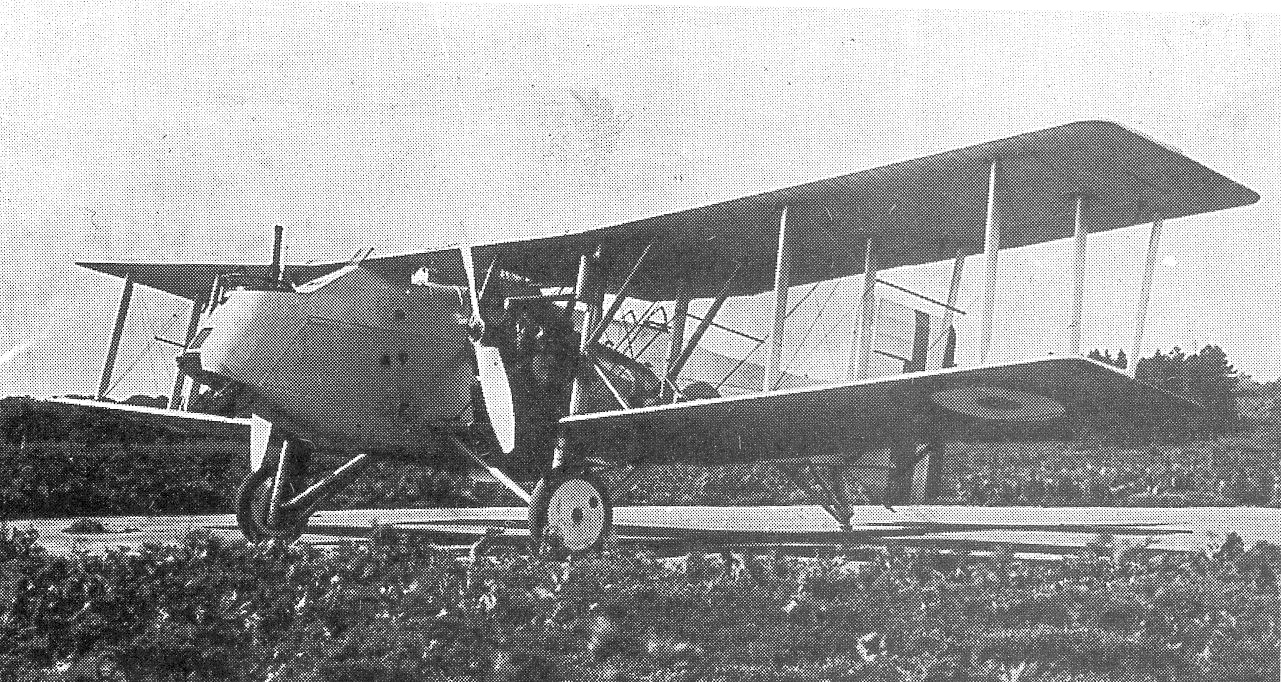
A Bugle II fitted with Napier Lion engines

Bugle I
Initial model, powered by a pair of 400 hp (298 kW) Bristol Jupiter II radial engines. Five built.
Bugle II
Improved model, powered by a pair of 450 hp Napier Lion W-block engines. Two built.

== Specifications (Bugle II) ==
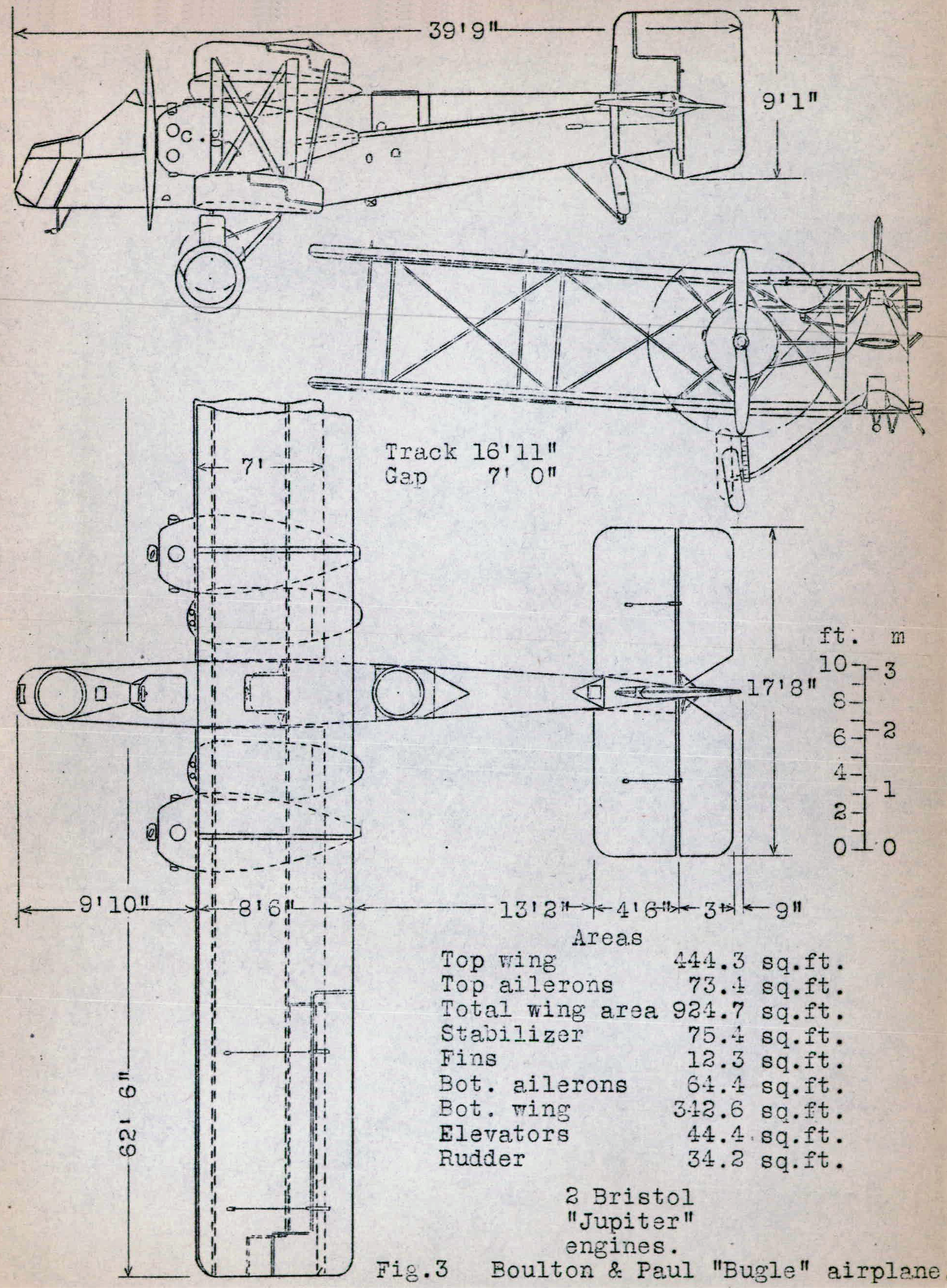
Boulton Paul Bugle 3-view drawing from NACA Aircraft Circular No.26

Data from Boulton Paul Aircraft since 1915, The British Bomber since 1912

General characteristics

- Crew: 3
- Length: 39 ft 9 in (12.12 m)
- Wingspan: 62 ft 6 in (19.05 m)
- Height: 15 ft 8 in (4.78 m)
- Wing area: 925 sq ft (85.9 m^{2})
- Gross weight: 8,914 lb (4,043 kg)
- Powerplant: 2 × Napier Lion water-cooled W12 engine, 450 hp (340 kW) each

Performance

- Maximum speed: 112 mph (180 km/h, 97 kn) at sea level

Armament

- Guns: 0.303 in (7.7 mm) Lewis guns at nose and dorsal positions
- Bombs: 690 lb (310 kg) external bombs
