= Boulton Paul P.10 =

P.10
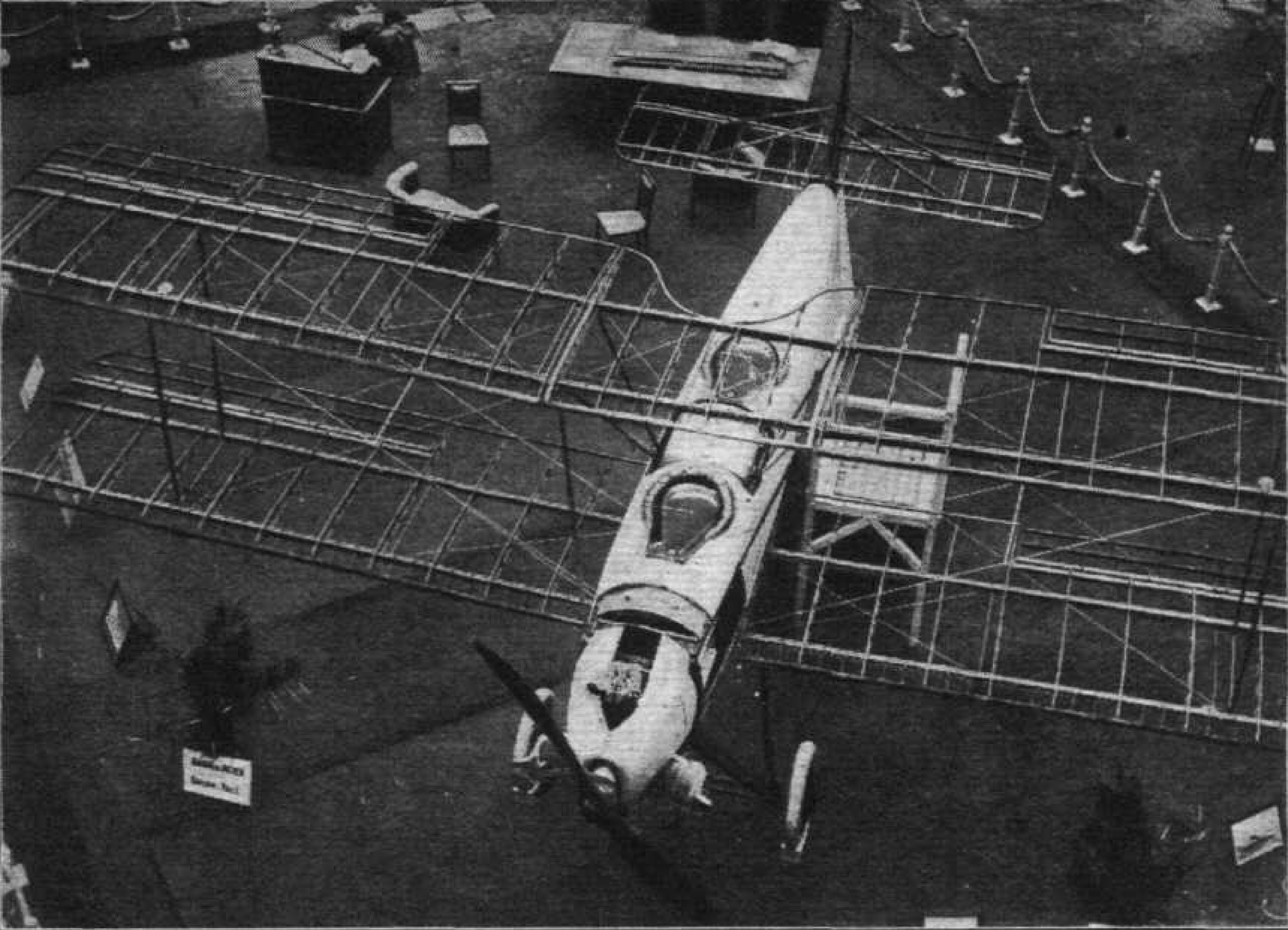

General information
- Type: Experimental two seat biplane
- National origin: United Kingdom
- Manufacturer: Boulton & Paul Ltd
- Designer: John Dudley North
- Number built: 1

History
- First flight: no record of flight

The Boulton & Paul P.10 was a two-seat, single-engined biplane built just after World War I to develop techniques for the construction of all steel aircraft. It is also notable for its first use of plastic as a structural material. Only one P.10 was built and it attracted much attention; but it probably never flew.

== Design and development ==
In the first decade of the 20th century, Boulton and Paul besides their wood construction shops also had plants for iron making, wire fencing and structural steel for buildings. It is not surprising therefore that when they became involved with aircraft production in World War I and then began their own designs they soon looked to the use of steel airframes. The Boulton & Paul P.10 was the first example and only their third design.

The P.10 was a single-engined two-seat biplane with an airframe of high tensile steel, zinc treated and varnished against corrosion. It had single bay wings with no stagger or sweep. Both wings had the same span and the same constant chord. Rather like the earlier P.6, the interwing gap was large and equal to the chord, putting the upper wing high above the fuselage. Either side of the centre section were a pair of vee struts to front and rear spars, assisted by another strut from front spar to the engine bulkhead The wings were built around two I section spars, each a box section constructed from rolled strips. The forward spar had four of these strips, the rear two. The P.10 was displayed at the Paris Salon d'Aeronautique in 1919 without its fabric covering, the wing construction was in plain view. There were interconnected ailerons on both wings. The P.10 had a small fin, which with its horn balanced rudder formed a teardrop shape. The tail, with unbalanced elevators was strut braced to the fin.

The front fuselage was built on four tubular longerons, but from leading edge rearwards it consisted of a set of oval formers with stringers. The greatest novelty of the P.10 was that this part of the fuselage was not only a monocoque structure (still fairly unusual at the time), but a monocoque of steel with a load-bearing plastic skin riveted between the formers and stringers. Specifically, the plastic was Bakelite-Dilecto, a hard, synthetic cellulose-formaldehyde product. The company claimed it was proof against fire, heat, humidity and insects. This was the first use of structural plastic in an airframe and perhaps the last for another sixty years.

This construction gave the fuselage a smooth, rounded "torpedo-like" look, which was enhanced by the close cowling of the 100 hp (75 kW) Cosmos Lucifer radial engine, though its three cylinders projected out a long way for cooling. This engine drove a four bladed wooden propeller, the only wooden part of the airframe. Boulton Paul had made their own propellers during the war. The front cockpit was at the wing leading edge with a rather distant second cockpit under the trailing edge, about 5 ft 6 in (1.68 m) aft. Dual control was fitted. As exhibited in Paris, the P.10 had a tall single axle undercarriage mounted on a pair of vee-struts on either side. These were bungee sprung, though there were plans for oleo dampers.

The P.10 was not the first metal British aircraft, for the unlikely looking Seddon Mayfly holds that priority; but it never had a realistic hope of flight. One lesser novelty, which was to become a standard Boulton & Paul feature was the mounting of the Lucifer on a hinge so that it could be swung sideways for servicing without disconnecting pipework etc.

The P.10 made a big impact at the 1919 Paris show, with Flight describing it as "the machine of the show". Nonetheless, after the show the P.10 disappeared from sight. There is no record of it flying, though there seems no reason why it should not have been capable. There are reports of it being damaged when the engine failed. It was not at the Paris show of 1920. Surprisingly, the delicate structures of one wing and the fin and rudder assembly have survived. The fin and rudder are at the Bridewell Museum in Boulton & Paul's home town of Norwich. The wing section is now on display hanging from the ceiling of the International Aviation Academy Norwich at Norwich Airport.

== Specifications (performance estimated) ==
Data from

General characteristics

- Crew: 2
- Length: 26 ft 0 in (7.92 m)
- Wingspan: 30 ft 0 in (9.14 m)
- Height: 12 ft 0 in (3.66 m)
- Wing area: 309 sq ft (28.7 m^{2})
- Empty weight: 1,104 lb (501 kg)
- Gross weight: 1,700 lb (771 kg)
- Powerplant: 1 × Cosmos Lucifer air-cooled 3-cylinder radial engine, 100 hp (75 kW)

Performance

- Maximum speed: 104 mph (167 km/h, 90 kn) at 1,000 ft (300 m)
- Endurance: 5 hr at 90 mph (140 km/h) and 3,000 ft (910 m)
- Service ceiling: 14,000 ft (4,300 m)
- Time to altitude: 8 min to 5,000 ft (1,500 m)
