= Frank Courtney =

Canadian rower (1906–1944)

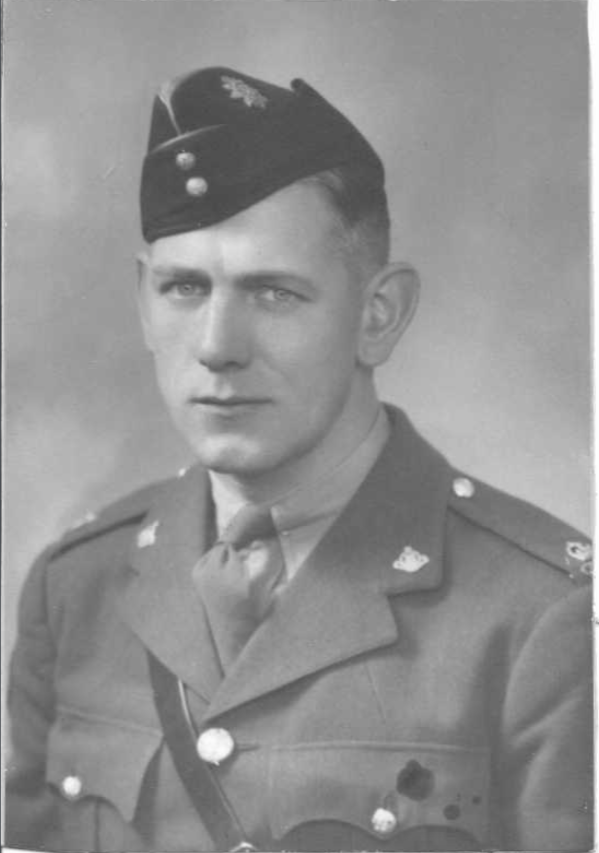

Personal information
- Nationality: Canadian
- Born: 13 July 1906; Reading, Berkshire, England
- Died: 28 August 1944 (aged 38); Basse-Normandie, German-occupied France

Sport
- Sport: Rowing

Francis Bernard Courtney (13 July 1906 – 28 August 1944) was a Canadian rower. He competed in the men's coxless four event at the 1932 Summer Olympics. He was killed in action during World War II.

== Personal life ==
Courtney served as a major in the South Saskatchewan Regiment during the Second World War. He was killed on 28 August 1944 whilst fighting in the Basse-Normandie region of France. Courtney is buried at Bretteville-sur-Laize Canadian War Cemetery.
