= Avro 533 Manchester =

Manchester
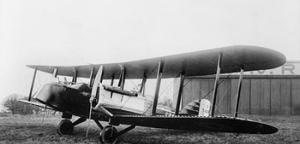
- Avro 533 Manchester Mk II (redesign)

General information
- Type: Photo-reconnaissance/bomber biplane
- National origin: United Kingdom
- Manufacturer: Avro
- Status: Prototype
- Number built: 3 (last prototype built without engines)

History
- First flight: December 1918
- Developed from: Avro Pike

The Avro 533 Manchester was a First World War-era twin-engine biplane photo-reconnaissance and bomber aircraft designed and manufactured by Avro.

== Design and development ==
Designed as a twin-engine bomber and photo-reconnaissance aircraft, the Avro 533 was a development of the earlier 523 and 529A. Originally designated the Avro 529B, the new 320 hp (240 kW) ABC Dragonfly I nine-cylinder engine was specified, but with a redesign in July 1918, the type number was subsequently changed to Avro 533. When the original engines were not available, the 300 hp (220 kW) Siddeley Puma engine was substituted on the second prototype in November 1918, this acquiring a new designation, the Avro 533A Manchester Mk II, and first flying in December that year. An American 400 hp (300 kW) Liberty engine was also proposed as an alternate engine.

== Operational history ==
The Avro 533A Manchester Mk II flew for the first time in December 1918 with flight testing continuing with No. 186 Development Squadron. By March 1919, Avro sent the first prototype to Aeroplane and Armament Experimental Establishment at Martlesham Heath for official trials before its eventual return to the Avro factory at Hamble. The aircraft was a large, and mainly conventional design of wood-and-fabric construction typical of the time. Open cockpits were retained, although later modifications were planned for passenger compartments in the interior.

In December 1919, the second prototype received its Dragonfly I engines, becoming the Avro 533A Manchester Mk I. Other than the different engines, there were few differences between the two types, other than the Mk I having a slightly reduced lower wing surface, and enlarged tailfin and rudder to correct control problems indicated in testing. Flight testing also indicated a lower performance than anticipated which resulted in Avro reconsidering the type's further trials, and eventually led to the abandoning of the third prototype, which was never fitted with engines.

In March 1919, Avro proposed a passenger airliner, the Avro 537, that would be adapted from the earlier bomber version. The plans were ultimately abandoned and all the Type 533 prototypes were scrapped.

== Variants ==
- Avro 533A Mk I – original design (first designated Avro 529B and later Avro 533)
- Avro 533A Mk II – Siddeley Puma engine

== Specifications (Mk.II) ==
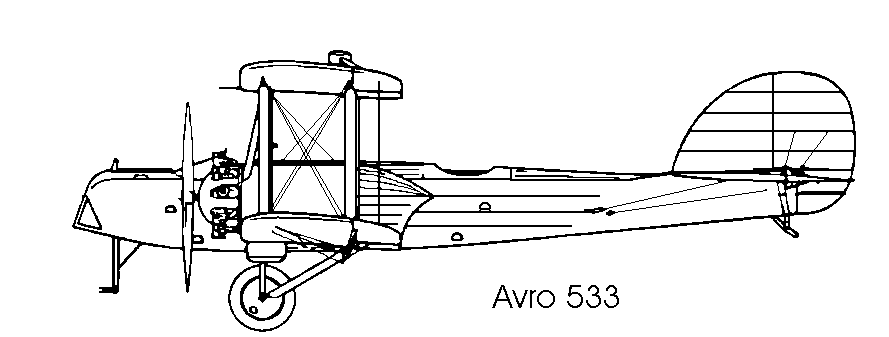
Avro 533 Mk 1 (as originally designed)

Data from Jane's all the World's Aircraft 1919Jane's Fighting Aircraft of World War I, Avro Aircraft since 1908

General characteristics

- Crew: 3
- Capacity: 1,614 lb (732 kg) disposable load
- Length: 37 ft (11 m)
- Wingspan: 60 ft (18 m)
- Height: 12 ft 6 in (3.81 m)
- Wing area: 817 sq ft (75.9 m^{2}) (excluding engine nacelles)
- Empty weight: 4,574 lb (2,075 kg)
- Gross weight: 7,158 lb (3,247 kg)
- Fuel capacity: 116 imp gal (139 US gal; 530 L)
- Powerplant: 2 × Siddeley Puma 6-cylinder water-cooled in-line piston engines, 300 hp (220 kW) each ::::Mk.I 2x 320 hp (240 kW) ABC Dragonfly I 9-cylinder radial engine

Mk.III 2x 400 hp (300 kW) Liberty L-12

- Propellers: 2-bladed Avro Tractor type D, 9 ft 6 in (2.9 m) diameter 2 m (6 ft 7 in) pitch at 1,600 rpm, fixed-pitch propellers

Performance

- Maximum speed: 125 mph (201 km/h, 109 kn) at sea level

119 mph (103 kn; 192 km/h) at 10,000 ft (3,000 m)
112.5 mph (97.8 kn; 181.1 km/h) at 10,000 ft (3,000 m)

- Landing speed: 45 mph (39 kn; 72 km/h)
- Stall speed: 45 mph (72 km/h, 39 kn)
- Endurance: 3 hours 30 minutes at 10,000 ft (3,000 m) including climb
- Service ceiling: 17,000 ft (5,200 m)
- Time to altitude:

5,000 ft (1,500 m) in 6 minutes 30 seconds
10,000 ft (3,000 m) in 16 minutes 20 seconds
15,000 ft (4,600 m) in 32 minutes
17,000 ft (5,200 m) in 42 minutes

- Wing loading: 8.76 lb/sq ft (42.8 kg/m^{2})
- Power/mass: 0.0838 hp/lb (0.1378 kW/kg)

Armament

- Guns: 2 × 0.303 in (7.7 mm) Lewis Guns at nose and midships positions
- Bombs: 880 lb (400 kg)
