= Scarff ring =

Type of machine gun mounting

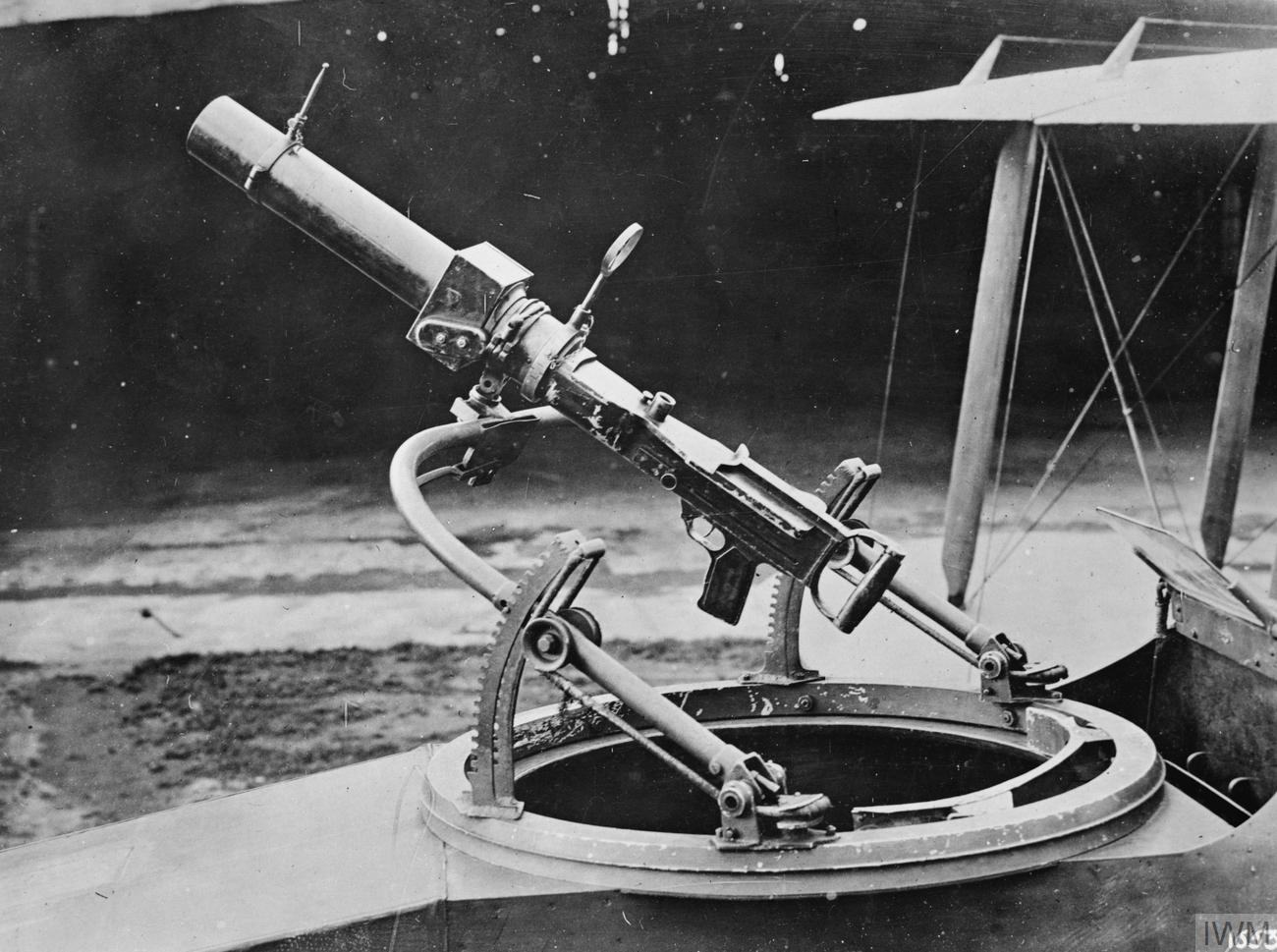
Scarff ring on an Airco DH.9

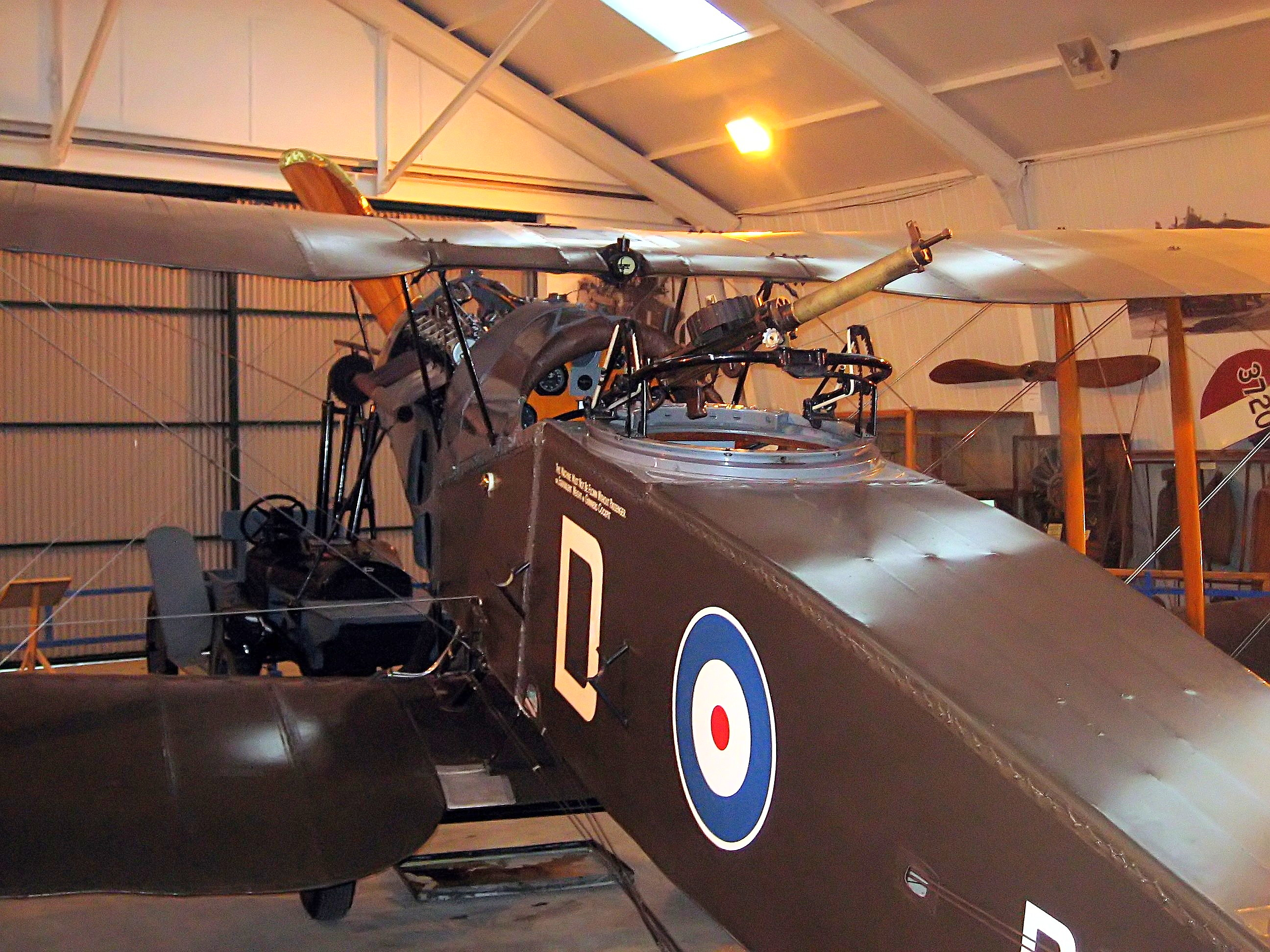
Scarff ring on a Bristol F.2B at the Shuttleworth Collection

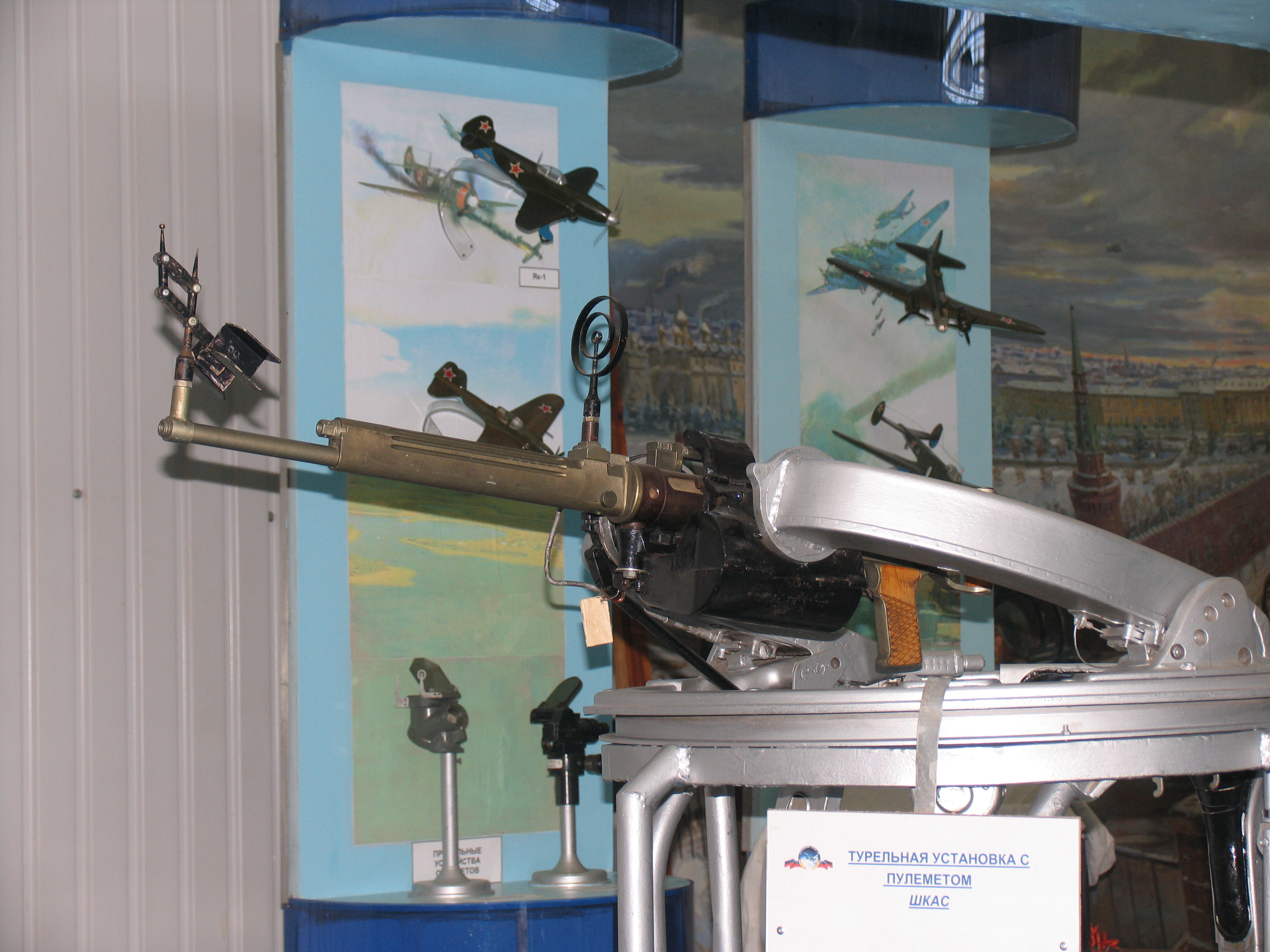
Soviet aircraft used the Scarff ring into WWII, here seen mounting a ShKAS machine gun.

The Scarff ring was a type of machine gun mounting developed during the First World War by Warrant Officer (Gunner) F. W. Scarff of the Admiralty Air Department for use on two-seater aircraft. The mount incorporated bungee cord suspension in elevation to compensate for the weight of the gun, and allowed an airgunner in an open cockpit to swivel and elevate his weapon (a Lewis machine gun) quickly, and easily fire in any direction. Later models permitted the fitting of two Lewis guns; while this doubled the firepower available, operation of the paired guns was more cumbersome, and required considerable strength from the gunner, especially at altitude, so that many gunners preferred the original single gun - and this became the postwar standard. In either case, the mounting was simple and rugged, and gave its operator an excellent field of fire. It was widely adapted and copied for other airforces.

As well as becoming a standard fitting in the British forces during the First World War, the Scarff ring was used in the postwar Royal Air Force for many years. Perhaps the last British aircraft to use the mounting was the Supermarine Walrus amphibian prototype.

Scarff was also involved in the development of the Scarff-Dibovsky synchronization gear.

Although it was a seemingly simple device, later attempts to emulate the Scarff ring as a mounting for the dorsal Vickers K in the World War II Handley Page Hampden bomber were failures. Handley Page had designed a carriage with ball-bearing wheels running on a track around the cockpit. Vibration when firing shook the balls out, jamming the mounting.

In the 1930s, the Germans developed a similar system called the Drehkranz D 30 (German: "slewing ring") which was used on a number of German aircraft, most notably the Junkers Ju 52.

In British use the Scarff ring was replaced in the 1930s by specialised power-operated turrets such as those made by Boulton Paul or Nash & Thompson, aircraft air speeds having by then risen to the point where a manually operated gun was unfeasible.

The Scarff ring was also fitted to the Rolls-Royce Armoured Car vehicles of the RAF Armoured Car Companies, antecedents to the RAF Regiment.

== Bibliography ==
- Wallace, G. F. (1972). The Guns of the Royal Air Force 1939–1945. London: William Kimber. ISBN 0-7183-0362-8.
