= Westland PV.7 =

PV.7

General information
- Type: Military general-purpose aircraft
- National origin: United Kingdom
- Manufacturer: Westland Aircraft Co. Ltd
- Designer: Arthur Davenport
- Number built: 1

History
- First flight: 30 October 1933

The Westland PV.7 was a private venture submission to a 1930s British specification for a general-purpose military aircraft with two crew. It was a single-engined, high-wing monoplane of promise, but was destroyed early in official tests.

== Design and development ==
The Air Ministry specification G.4/31 called for a Westland Wapiti replacement, a multi-role aircraft capable of carrying out level bombing, army co-operation, dive bombing, reconnaissance, casualty evacuation and torpedo bombing. Nine manufacturers responded with designs, and while some gained contracts for single prototypes, such were the potential rewards that others, like Westland, built aircraft as private ventures. Contenders were the Armstrong Whitworth A.W.19, Blackburn B-7, Bristol 120, Fairey G.4/31, Handley Page HP.47, Hawker P.V.4, Parnall G.4/31, Vickers Type 253 and the Westland PV.7. Only Westland and Handley Page submitted monoplane designs. The Ministry expressed a preference for an air-cooled engine and all manufacturers apart from Armstrong-Whitworth and Blackburn chose the nine-cylinder Bristol Pegasus radial.

The Westland PV.7 was a large, tall single-engined high-wing monoplane with separate cockpits for two crew. The constant-chord wings were all-metal, built around two spars with ribs and inter-spar rods for stiffening. Leading-edge Handley Page slats were fitted outboard, and the inboard trailing edges carried 4 ft 9 in (1.45 m) span split flaps that opened symmetrically above and below the wing to act as dive brakes. Ailerons extended Immediately outboard of the flaps, almost to the wing tips. The wings met the top of the fuselage, with the pilot's head between them and behind the line of the outer leading edge, so at the centre the wings were thinned and tapered on the leading edge to improve his view. Originally his cockpit was open, but as it was only 6 ft (1.83 m) behind the propeller it was very draughty and was eventually glazed in, with entry via an opening upper panel and extending rearwards above the wing. On each side a pair of parallel, cranked lift struts joined the lower fuselage to about mid-span, reinforced by struts from the crank-point to the upper fuselage. The main lift struts had a wide chord airfoil section and themselves contributed to lift. The main undercarriage legs were fitted to these struts at the crank-point, each axle supported by a pair of V-struts to the lower fuselage. There was a castoring tailwheel under the tailplane.

The fuselage was mostly constructed from square-section duralumin tube with some steel at critical points and alloy formers and stringers to shape it. It was mostly fabric-covered, though there was some metal sheet in the forward part and a plywood decking around the rear cockpit. The tail unit was metal-framed and fabric-covered, with a narrow parallel chord braced tailplane and elevators. The fin and rudder were broad, the latter extending to the base of the fuselage. Initially both elevators and rudder were horn-balanced. The second crew member's large cockpit was just behind the trailing edge, enclosed in a multi-piece, segmented glazed cover that could be folded away forward when gunnery using the Scarff ring mounted Lewis machine gun was necessary. From there he could access the bomb aimer's position, lit by two small underwing windows on each side, lying prone on the fuselage floor. Part of the reason for the tall, split-axle undercarriage was to allow a torpedo of up to 1,100 lb (500 kg) to be held in crutches between the legs; alternatively two 500 lb (227 kg) bombs could be carried in under-fuselage racks. The pilot had control of a port side, forward firing Vickers machine gun.

The PV.7 was powered by a Bristol Pegasus IIIM3 engine within a Townend ring, which produced 722 hp (538 kW) and drove a two-bladed wooden propeller. It flew for the first time on 30 October 1933, with Harald Penrose, Westland's regular test pilot at the controls. Early flights showed the need to glaze the cockpit and lighten the ailerons, and later tests at higher speed revealed that the wing twisted under aileron loads. This latter problem required significant re-working of the wing structure, specifically the replacement of the inter-spar rods with torsionally stiffer tubes. Flight testing also showed that the rudder was aerodynamically over-balanced, causing oscillations cured by removal of the horn balance entirely.

The PV.7 featured in the New Types Park at the 1934 Hendon RAF Display at the end of June, then went to the RAF Martlesham Heath for official testing. Since this was to be done by Service pilots, Westland cancelled their insurance cover as any damage would be paid for by the government. The initial reaction of the RAF pilots was encouraging. On 25 August, at the request of the Air Ministry Penrose flew the aircraft again, making tests of its behaviour with the centre of gravity far aft. After he had taken off, a telegram arrived at Martlesham saying that this test should not proceed as the airframe would be over-stressed, but Penrose was not in radio contact and went ahead. In a high-speed dive the Westland calculations were confirmed by the collapse of the port wing. Penrose was lucky to escape by parachute, as the upper hatch had jammed and he had to squeeze out of a small side window, becoming the first British pilot to bale out of an aircraft with an enclosed cockpit. It was the end of Westland's G.4/31 hopes, though; the Air Ministry would not pay for the loss of an aircraft flown by a civilian, and the company could not afford to build a replacement.

In the end, none of the aircraft originally submitted to the specification was built in quantity, for although the Vickers 253 was declared winner and ordered, it was replaced by the slightly later and much superior Vickers Wellesley.

== Specifications ==
Data from James 1991, pp. 215–6

General characteristics

- Crew: 2
- Length: 38 ft 8 in (11.79 m)
- Wingspan: 60 ft 3 in (18.36 m)
- Height: 12 ft 0 in (3.66 m)
- Wing area: 537 sq ft (49.9 m^{2}) including lift struts
- Airfoil: RAF34
- Empty weight: 4,515 lb (2,048 kg)
- Gross weight: 7,172 lb (3,253 kg)
- Powerplant: 1 × Bristol Pegasus IIIM3 9-cylinder radial, geared, unsupercharged
- Propellers: 2-bladed, 12 ft 4 in (3.76 m) diameter

Performance

- Maximum speed: 173 mph (278 km/h, 150 kn) at 5,000 ft (1,525 m)
- Service ceiling: 22,700 ft (6,900 m) absolute
- Rate of climb: 1,250 ft/min (6.4 m/s) to 10,000 ft (3,050 m)

Armament

- Guns: 1×0.303 in (7.7 mm) fixed forward firing Vickers machine gun plus 1×0.303 in (7.7 mm) Lewis gun on Scarff ring in rear cockpit
- Bombs: 1×1,100 lb (500 kg) torpedo or 2×500 lb (228 kg) bombs
