= Hawker P.V.4 =

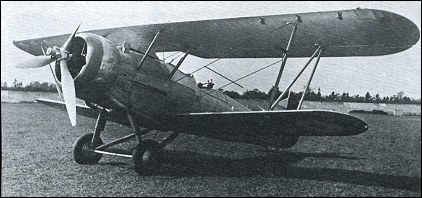
- Hawker P.V.4

General information
- Type: General-purpose bomber, reconnaissance and dive bomber
- Manufacturer: Hawker
- Designer: Sydney Camm
- Primary user: RAF (intended)
- Number built: 1

History
- First flight: 6 December 1934
- Variants: Hawker Hart

The Hawker P.V.4 was a 1930s British biplane aircraft built by Hawker Aircraft in competition for a government order for a general-purpose military aircraft.

== Design and development ==
In 1931, the British Air Ministry issued a their Specification G.4/31 for a "Standard General Purpose" aircraft. The duties were to include liaison, bombing (both day and night), dive bombing, torpedo bombing, and reconnaissance.

As none of the competing prototypes ordered for the competition could carry out all of the roles, and as individually aircraft of the Hawker Hart series could perform most of these duties, with the Hart having excellent handling in a dive, Hawkers decided to base their entry on the Hind development of the Hart. They built the P.V.4 as a private venture (i.e., with their own money) as a two-seat light bomber; although the bomb load of 570 lb (259 kg) was the same as the Hart, the reinforced fuselage and wings allowed the P.V.4 to dive with this load.

== Testing ==
The P.V.4 was first flown from the Brooklands airfield on 6 December 1934. The Bristol Pegasus III engine was initially used, but this was changed to the Pegasus X in 1935. In trials, it proved to be the only one of the competitors to be fully suitable for dive-bombing; unfortunately, because of its cross-axle undercarriage, it could not carry a torpedo. The dive bombing duty was dropped from the specification, however, so the aircraft had little extra to offer and it lost out to the Vickers Wellesley monoplane which entered production.

Only one aircraft was built. This was eventually used for spinning tests, and then sent to Bristol Aeroplane to be used as an engine test bed, with several other engines being installed. The Finnish Air Force in the 1930s, evaluated different dive bombers including the Hawker P.V.4, eventually choosing the Fokker C.X light bomber. The sole P.V.4 prototype was struck off charge on 29 March 1939.

== Specification (with the Pegasus X engine) ==
Data from The British Bomber since 1914

General characteristics

- Crew: two
- Length: 29 ft 10 in (9.09 m)
- Wingspan: 40 ft 0 in (12.19 m)
- Height: 11 ft 10 in (3.61 m)
- Wing area: 348 sq ft (32.3 m^{2})
- Empty weight: 3,728 lb (1,691 kg)
- Gross weight: 6,650 lb (3,016 kg)
- Powerplant: 1 × Bristol Pegasus X nine-cylinder air-cooled radial engine, 690 hp (510 kW)
- Propellers: 2-bladed Watts wooden propeller

Performance

- Maximum speed: 183 mph (295 km/h, 159 kn) at 6,600 ft (2,000 m)
- Range: 460 mi (740 km, 400 nmi)
- Service ceiling: 23,700 ft (7,200 m)
- Time to altitude: 6 min 45 s to 10,000 ft (3,000 m)

Armament

- Guns:
  - 1 x Vickers machine gun installed in the nose.
  - 1 x Lewis gun mounted in the rear cockpit.
- Bombs: 500 lb (230 kg) of bombs

== See also ==
Aircraft of comparable role, configuration, and era

- Fairey G.4/31
- Handley Page H.P.47
- Parnall G.4/31
- Vickers Type 253
- Vickers Wellesley
- Westland PV-7
