= G.4/31 =

G.4/31 may refer to:

- Fairey G.4/31, a general-purpose British military biplane
- Parnall G.4/31, a general-purpose British military biplane
- The British Air Ministry's specification G.4/31 (see List of Air Ministry specifications) to which the above aircraft were supplied
