= Vickers Type 253 =

Single-engined two-seat biplane

Type 253
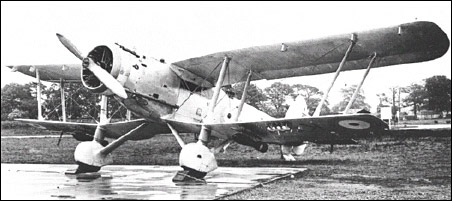

General information
- Type: Multi-role military
- National origin: United Kingdom
- Manufacturer: Vickers-Armstrongs Ltd
- Designer: R.K.Pierson & Barnes Wallis
- Number built: 1

History
- Retired: 16 August 1934

The Vickers Type 253 was a single-engined two-seat biplane general-purpose military machine, built to a 1930 government specification. It won a production contract, but this was transferred to the same company's monoplane equivalent, the Wellesley. Only one Type 253 was built.

== Development ==
In April 1932, the Air Ministry awarded a contract to Vickers for a single prototype aircraft under Air Ministry specification G.4/31 for a Westland Wapiti replacement, a multi-role aircraft capable of carrying out level bombing, army co-operation, dive bombing, reconnaissance, casualty evacuation and torpedo bombing. Vickers' entrant to this competition was the Type 253, though often known by the specification as the Vickers G.4/31. The Ministry had also ordered prototypes of other designs and some manufacturers had offered private ventures (aircraft built with their own money). The Type 253 was in competition with the Handley Page HP.47. Fairey G.4/31, Westland PV.7, Armstrong Whitworth A.W.19, Blackburn B-7, Hawker P.V.4 and the Parnall G.4/31. The Ministry preferred an air-cooled engine, and Vickers' choice was the radial Bristol Pegasus.

The Vickers Type 253 used a Pegasus IIM3 engine, enclosed by a drag-reducing Townend ring, to power a two-bay, unstaggered biplane, with a lower wing smaller in span and chord. Both wings were of constant chord, but the centre sections were mildly forward-swept and the lower centre section carried anhedral out to the inner interplane struts. Both sets of interplane struts leaned outwards with the outer ones more so, while both wings carried ailerons and the upper planes had leading edge slats. The wings joined the fuselage top and bottom with no gap, the pilot sitting just ahead of the leading edge in an open cockpit and the observer sitting well behind the trailing edge. A conventional tail carried balanced rudder and elevators. The split-axle fixed undercarriage was neatly mounted, the main legs fixed to the front spar under the inner interplane struts and braced rearwards to the wing roots.

Construction was the common one of canvas over a metal frame, but the fuselage frame was quite novel. It was designed by Vickers' chief structural engineer, Barnes Wallis and was a step along the road to his geodetic frames, where the distinction between main and secondary members was largely lost. The Type 207 fuselage frame had four light-alloy longerons, each made in sections that were screwed together. These longerons were joined by a pair of oppositely handed helical channel members, forming a diagonal tubular mesh. Wing construction was less radical, and indeed less novel than that of the earlier Type 207, which had thick RAF34 section wings built of complex webbing informed by Wallis' earlier airship experience; the Type 253 reverted to the thinner RAF15 section and a more familiar two spar design.

Mutt Summers took the Type 253 on its first flight on 16 August 1934 at Brooklands. It then went, after some modifications to the Aeroplane and Armament Experimental Establishment at Martlesham Heath for trials in the specification competition. In February 1935 the sole 253 flew with an uprated Pegasus IIIM3. The Type 253 won the competition and an order for 150 aircraft. However, on 19 June 1935, Summers flew the Type 246 monoplane that Vickers had built to the same specification as a private venture, which was to become the prototype Type 287 Wellesley. It was immediately apparent that the monoplane offered better performance and a greater payload, so the Type 253 order was cancelled and replaced with one for the Wellesley in September 1935.

== Specifications ==
Data from

General characteristics

- Crew: 2
- Length: 37 ft 0 in (11.28 m)
- Wingspan: 52 ft 7 in (16.03 m)
- Height: 12 ft 6 in (3.81 m)
- Wing area: 579 sq ft (53.8 m^{2})
- Airfoil: RAF 15
- Empty weight: 4,500 lb (2,041 kg)
- Gross weight: 8,350 lb (3,787 kg)
- Powerplant: 1 × Bristol Pegasus IIM3 nine-cylinder radial engine, 635 hp (474 kW)

Performance

- Maximum speed: 161 mph (259 km/h, 140 kn) at 4,500 ft (1,400 m)
- Service ceiling: 21,700 ft (6,600 m)
- Time to altitude: 8 min 30 s to 10,000 ft (3,000 m)

Armament

- Guns: 2×0.303 in (7.7 mm) Lewis machine guns, one firing from the port side upper fuselage through the propeller, the other ring mounted in the observer's cockpit.
