= Vickers Wellesley =

British single-engined medium bomber

Wellesley
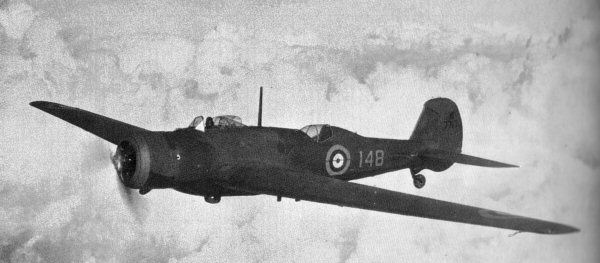
- Type 292 of the Long-Range Development unit. Unlike production Wellesleys, the engine cowling is blended with the fuselage profile.

General information
- Type: General purpose bomber
- Manufacturer: Vickers-Armstrongs Ltd
- Designer: Rex Pierson
- Primary users: Royal Air Force Royal Egyptian Air Force; South African Air Force
- Number built: 177

History
- Manufactured: 1936–1938
- Introduction date: 1937
- First flight: 19 June 1935
- Retired: 1944

The Vickers Wellesley was a medium bomber that was designed and produced by the British aircraft manufacturer Vickers-Armstrongs at Brooklands near Weybridge, Surrey. It was one of two aircraft to be named after Arthur Wellesley, 1st Duke of Wellington, the other being the Vickers Wellington.

The Wellesley was developed during the early 1930s in response to Specification G.4/31. The biplane Vickers Type 253 was effectively an early incarnation of the aircraft, sharing its radical geodesic airframe and many other features. The Type 253 was determined to be the best submission received by the Air Ministry, thus an order for 150 production aircraft was issued. As a private venture, Vickers had also developed the monoplane Type 256; following flight testing of this aircraft, the order placed for the Type 253 was converted for the Type 256 instead.

A high-profile demonstration of the aircraft's capabilities was conducted during early November 1938 via a flight of three Wellesleys that flew non-stop for two days from Ismailia, Egypt to Darwin, Australia, a distance of 7,162 miles (11,526 km), setting a world distance record in the process.

The vast majority of the Wellesley's production run was supplied to the Royal Air Force (RAF), a total of six squadrons under RAF Bomber Command operated the type at its peak.While the type was considered to be obsolete by the start of the Second World War and thus unsuited to the European air war, the Wellesley was operated overseas in the desert theatres of East Africa, Egypt and the Middle East. The final Wellesley-equipped unit, 47 Squadron, ended its use of the type as a maritime reconnaissance aircraft, during September 1942.

== Design and development ==
=== Background ===
The Wellesley's origins stretch back to the early 1930s, during which time Vickers' management were making great efforts to secure more business in the fixed-wing aircraft sector following the decision to discontinue airship production. Several of its designs around this period, often made in response to various specifications issued by the Air Ministry, revolved around a conventional biplane configuration, albeit larger than most contemporaries and being fitted with more powerful engines to match. While some of these proposals never went beyond the drawing board, they often harnessed the work of Barnes Wallis to save weight without compromising on strength by using light alloy structures.

During 1931, the Ministry released Specification G.4/31, which called for a general purpose aircraft that was capable of carrying out level bombing, army co-operation, dive bombing, reconnaissance, casualty evacuation and torpedo bombing. Vickers quickly took an interest in the requirement and gave its design team the task of producing its response. The team devised three separate conceptual aircraft, two being monoplanes with alternative engines fitted, and the third being a biplane design, known as the Vickers Type 253. Following the submission of these three design outlines to Air Ministry in November 1931, it accepted the Type 253, and issued an initial development contract to Vickers during April 1932.

Even as work proceeded on the construction of the Type 253 prototypes, Vickers' design office continued to independently work on a monoplane submission to fulfil the specification. This aircraft incorporated a geodesic airframe, which had been derived from Wallis' earlier work for the airship R100. According to aviation author C. F. Andrews, this design choice was a radical shift from established practices of the era, which had been virtually unchanged since the First World War. Wallis pursued this as it enabled substantial weight savings to be made via unheard of strength-to-weight ratios. The Type 253 also incorporated some of this structural design, but not to the full extent of the in-development monoplane.

Following their delivery, the Type 253 prototypes were subject to competitive testing of their fulfilment of the specification's various criteria against a range of competing aircraft, including the Fairey G.4/31, Westland PV-7, Handley Page HP.47, Armstrong Whitworth A.W.19, Blackburn B-7, Hawker P.V.4 and the Parnall G.4/31. From this, it was recognised that the Type 253 was the best submission, leading to Vickers receiving an order for 150 aircraft.

=== Type 246 ===
The private venture monoplane, which received the internal designation Vickers Type 246 continued to make progress. On 19 June 1935, it performed its maiden flight from Brooklands, piloted by Vickers' Chief Test Pilot J "Mutt" Summers, and was promptly offered to the Royal Air Force (RAF). This aircraft possessed superior performance, but did not attempt to meet the multi-role requirements of the specification, having been designed to perform the bomber role only. On 23 July 1934, the G.4/31 monoplane was damaged in a crash, it was rebuilt as a pre-production series Type 246 to support the latter's development.

Andrews observed that the Wellesley absorbed an abnormally high level of engineering development resources, largely due to the novel structure used throughout its airframe. Extensive metallurgical research was needed, along with various structural test rigs to validate the airframe's strength. The fabrication of the curved frames needed for its geodesic structure necessitated the development of new powered machinery that greatly improved production times over the hand-operated methods used at the start of the pre-production phase; the same machinery was subsequently used on various wartime and postwar aircraft, such as the Vickers VC10 jetliner. Andrews alleges that Vickers had also considered adopting stressed-skin construction for the Wellesley as well.

=== Into production ===
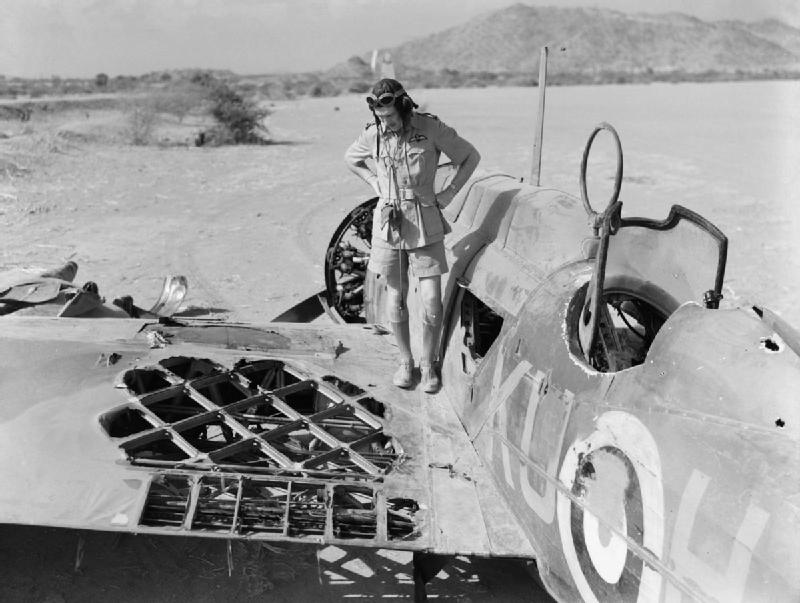
Wellesley wing damaged in action, showing the geodesic construction in duralumin

During September 1935, an initial order for 96 Type 246s was substituted for the Type 253 order, which received the service name Wellesley. In August 1936, the contract was revised, including a new requirement for the production model of the aircraft to be powered by the Bristol Pegasus XX radial engine. On 30 January 1937, the first production Wellesley performed its maiden flight from Brooklands, it was delivered for type tests at RAF Martlesham Heath on 18 March.

The RAF ultimately ordered a total of 176 aircraft to a newly-written Specification 22/35. During March 1937, quantity production of the Wellesley commenced, with all aircraft being produced over a 14 month period. By March 1938, 176 aircraft were in service, 57 of which were on home bases. Around this time, the RAF examined various options for improving the Wellesley, including provisions for a third crew member amidship as a navigator, while the bomb-aimers' prone position was also an area of attention. Due to vibration encountered when the bomb-container doors were open, these were eliminated with little resulting impact on drag. The Wellesley's initial wing lacked sufficient strength, leading to most aircraft being built with a revised design, while eight early examples were later retrofitted with the improved wing.

The Wellesley was a single-engine monoplane with a very high 8.83 aspect ratio wing and a manually operated, retractable undercarriage. As it was not known how the geodetic structure could cope with being disrupted by a bomb bay, the Wellesley's bomb load was instead carried in a pair of streamlined panniers underneath the wings. The Wellesley Mk I had two cockpits but this was slightly changed in what was unofficially dubbed the Wellesley Mk II, whose pilot's canopy was extended to cover the navigator/bomb aimer's position that had been buried in the fuselage. The gunner retained a separate canopy. Only the pilot was provided with flight controls. The aircraft was furnished with a three-axis autopilot.

== Operational history ==
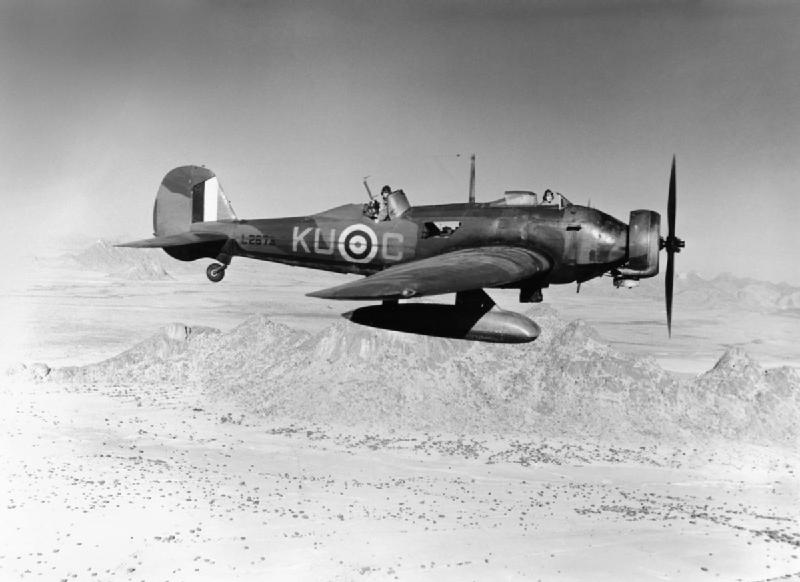
A Wellesley Mk.I of no. 47 Squadron RAF (as can be seen by the code letters 'KU') over the desert

The RAF received its first Wellesleys in April 1937: they served with No. 76 Squadron RAF at Finningley. The aircraft eventually equipped six RAF Bomber Command squadrons in the UK. Five aircraft with provisions for three crew members were modified for long-range work with the RAF Long-Range Development Flight. Additional modifications included the fitting of Pegasus XXII engines and extra fuel tanks. On 5 November 1938, three of these aircraft under command of Squadron Leader Richard Kellett flew non-stop for two days from Ismailia, Egypt to Darwin, Australia 7,162 miles (11,526 km) setting a world distance record. All three aircraft broke the record, but No. 2 aircraft landed in West Timor, 500 miles (800 km) short of the objective. The Wellesley's record remained unbroken until November 1945. This flight is still the longest by an aircraft with a single piston engine.

By the outbreak of the Second World War, the Wellesley had been entirely phased out by all home-based squadrons, with only four examples remaining in Britain; however, the type remained in service with three squadrons based in the Middle East. To replace the Wellesley, RAF Bomber Command had received large numbers of more capable twin-engined bombers, such as the Handley Page Hampden, Armstrong Whitworth Whitley and the Vickers Wellington; the latter shared its geodesic structure with the Wellesley.

Following the Italian declaration of war on 10 June 1940, the remaining Wellesley squadrons participated in the East African Campaign against Italian forces in Eritrea, Ethiopia and Somaliland. Although obsolete, the Wellesley formed a major part of the British Commonwealth bomber forces, mainly carrying out raids targeting Eritrea and northern Ethiopia. Sudan-based Wellesleys carried out their first bombing mission on 11 June 1940, against Asmara in Eritrea. Three days later, they were involved in their first air combat, when Capitano Mario Visintini, future top-scoring biplane ace of the Second World War, intercepted a pair of Wellesleys from 14 Squadron on their way to bomb Massawa. Visintini, who was flying a Fiat CR.42 Falco, shot down the aircraft K7743, flown by Pilot Officer Reginald Patrick Blenner Plunkett. It was the first of Visintini's 16 air victories in Eastern Africa.

In the early part of the campaign, fighter escort was not available and when caught by CR.42s, Wellesleys proved vulnerable to the Italian biplane fighter. Despite this, the Wellesley continued to be sent on bombing raids, bombing Addis Ababa from Aden on 18 August. The Wellesley continued in use against the Italians over East Africa until November 1941, when Gondar, the last Italian-held town, fell to Commonwealth and Ethiopian forces. The final Wellesley-equipped unit, 47 Squadron, was then switched to maritime reconnaissance duties over the Red Sea, continuing in this role until September 1942.

While the Wellesley was not a significant combat aircraft, the design principles that were tested in its construction were put to good use with the Wellington medium bomber, which became one of the mainstays of Bomber Command in the early years of the European war. During February 1940, three Wellesleys (K7728, K7735 and K8531) were sold to Egypt to serve in the Royal Egyptian Air Force.

== Variants ==
Type 281 Wellesley
Company designation for the Wellesley bomber.
Type 287 Wellesley Mk I
Two, and later three-seat medium bomber aircraft. The Wellesley Mk I had separate canopies for pilot and gunner's cockpits.
Wellesley Mk II
Unofficial designation used for examples with an extended canopy covering pilot and bomb aimer.
Type 289
Engine testbed to test the Hercules HE15 radial piston engine.
Type 291
Blind-flying model.
Type 292
Five aircraft modified for long-distance flying by the RAF's Long-Range Development Unit Flight. Alterations included extensive development work with a fuel dumping system to allow an emergency landing early in a long-distance flight when the weight of fuel would cause the aircraft to exceed its maximum landing weight. Visible differences included NACA-type long-chord cowlings. Three were used on the record-breaking flight.
Type 294
Prototype with strengthened wing for cutting barrage balloon cables.
Type 402
Three-seat experimental aircraft.

== Operators ==
South Africa

- South African Air Force

United Kingdom

- Royal Air Force
  - No. 7 Squadron RAF
  - No. 14 Squadron RAF
  - No. 35 Squadron RAF
  - No. 45 Squadron RAF
  - No. 47 Squadron RAF
  - No. 76 Squadron RAF
  - No. 77 Squadron RAF
  - No. 117 Squadron RAF
  - No. 148 Squadron RAF
  - No. 207 Squadron RAF
  - No. 223 Squadron RAF
  - No. 267 Squadron RAF

== Specifications (Wellesley) ==
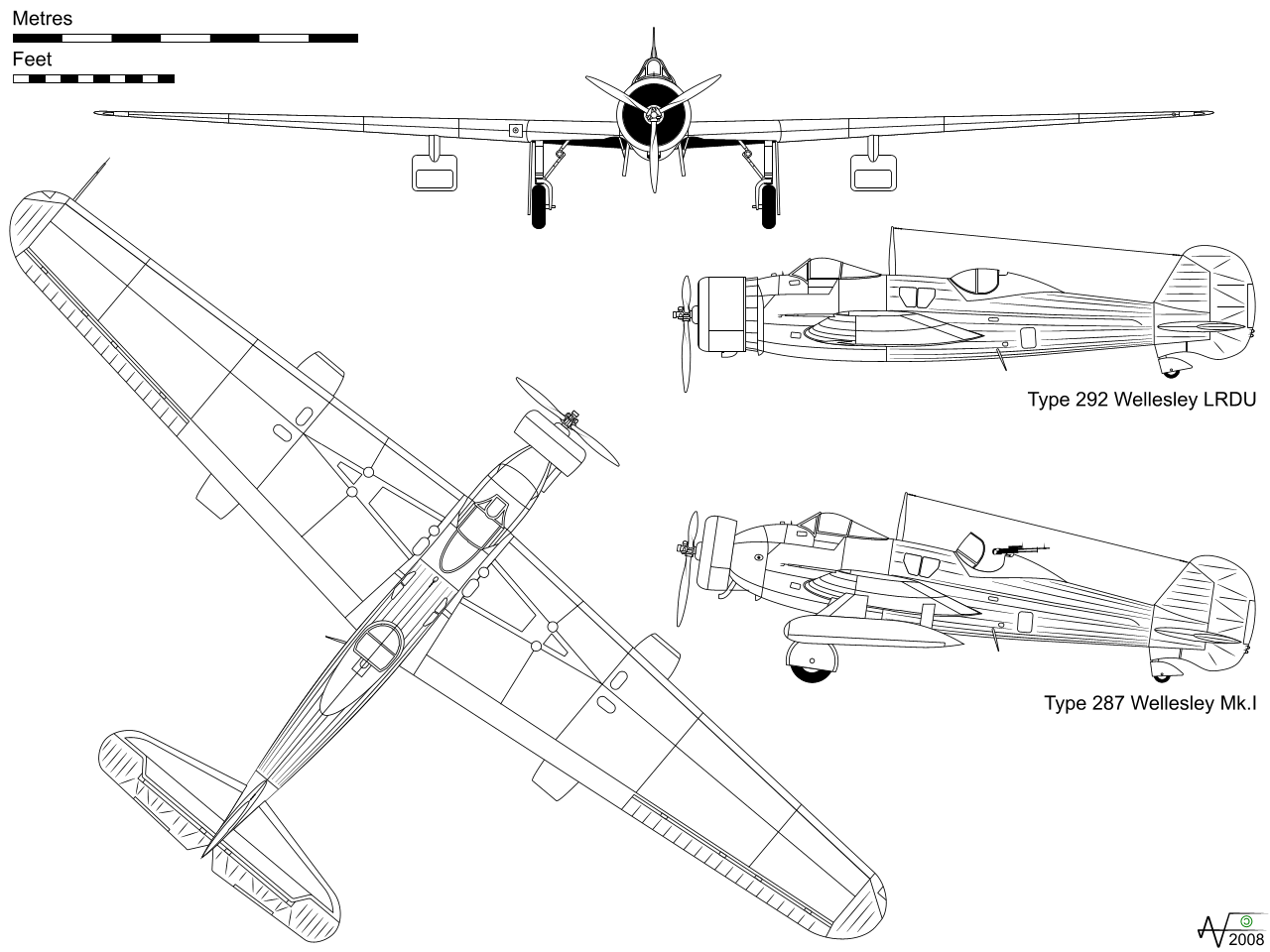
Orthographic projection of the Wellesley Mk.I, with profile of the Type 292 used by the LRDU record-breaking flight.

Data from The Wellesley: Geodetics in Action

General characteristics

- Crew: 3 (pilot, bomb-aimer, and rear-gunner)
- Length: 39 ft 3 in (11.96 m)
- Wingspan: 74 ft 4 in (22.66 m)
- Height: 15 ft 3 1/2 in (4.661 m)
- Wing area: 630 sq ft (59 m^{2})
- Empty weight: 6,760 lb (3,066 kg)
- Gross weight: 11,048 lb (5,011 kg)
- Max takeoff weight: 12,500 lb (5,670 kg)
- Powerplant: 1 × Bristol Pegasus XX radial engine, 925 hp (690 kW)

Performance

- Maximum speed: 228 mph (367 km/h, 198 kn) at 19,700 ft (6,000 m)
- Cruise speed: 180 mph (290 km/h, 160 kn) at 15,000 ft (4,600 m) (57% power)
- Range: 1,220 mi (1,960 km, 1,060 nmi)
- Service ceiling: 25,500 ft (7,800 m)
- Time to altitude: 17.8 min to 15,000 ft (4,600 m)

Armament

- Guns:
  - One × .303 in (7.7 mm) Vickers machine gun in right wing
  - One × .303 in (7.7 mm) Vickers K machine gun in rear cockpit
- Bombs: 2,000 lb (910 kg) of bombs

== See also ==
Related development

- Vickers Wellington

Aircraft of comparable role, configuration, and era

- Breda Ba.65
- Fairey Battle
- Heinkel He 70
- Vultee V-11

Related lists

- List of aircraft of the Royal Air Force
- List of aircraft of World War II
- List of bomber aircraft
