= Armstrong Whitworth A.W.19 =

British single-engine biplane

A.W.19
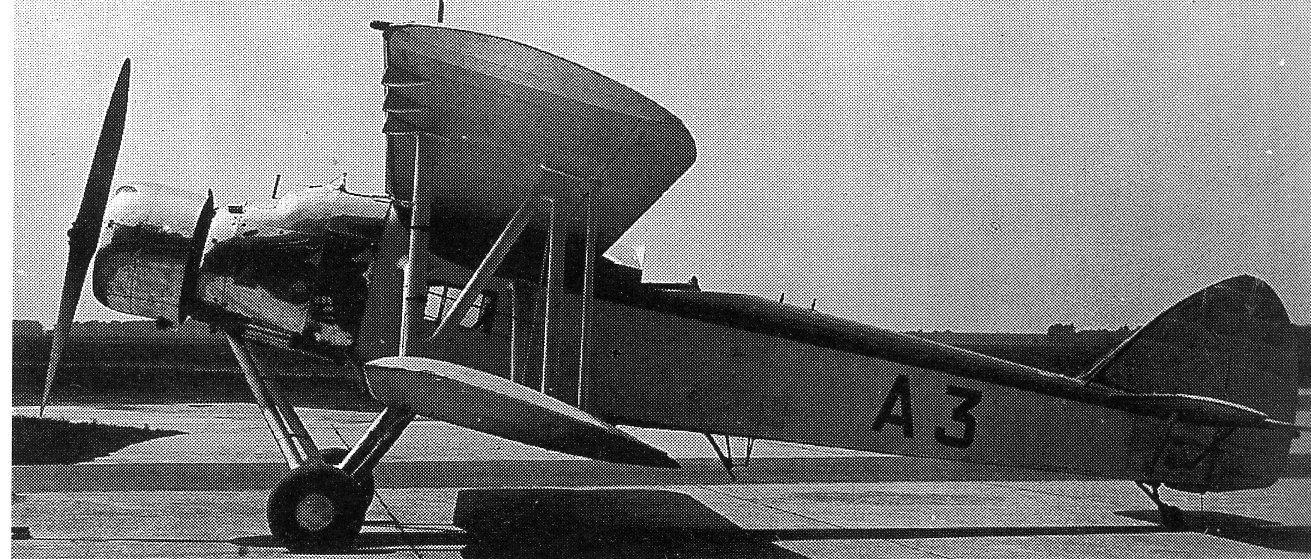

General information
- Type: General purpose military
- National origin: United Kingdom
- Manufacturer: Sir W.G.Armstrong Whitworth Aircraft Company
- Number built: 1

History
- First flight: 26 February 1934

The Armstrong Whitworth A.W.19 was a two/three-seat single-engine biplane, built as a general-purpose military aircraft in the mid-1930s. A newer, monoplane aircraft was preferred and only one A.W.19 was built.

== Development ==
Multi-tasking "general purpose" aircraft were attractive to a British Air Ministry keen to use air power to help control a large Empire. Manufacturers welcomed these aircraft in the hope of large contracts. So when Air Ministry Specification G.4/31 was issued in July 1931 for a Westland Wapiti replacement capable of filling roles as a day or night light bomber, a dive bomber, (Note: The requirement for dive bombing was later removed.) an army co-operation, reconnaissance or casualty evacuation aircraft, modifying the specification in October that year to add the roles of torpedo bomber and maritime reconnaissance, it attracted considerable attention from British manufacturers, with 30 designs being submitted from 12 manufacturers. Only three companies were awarded single prototype contracts, but another five decided to submit private venture machines. The Armstrong Whitworth A.W.19 was one of the latter group.

The A.W.19 was a single-engine single-bay biplane with unswept, constant chord wings of mild stagger. The wings were fabric covered over a structure built up around rolled-steel strip spars and aluminium alloy ribs. Both planes carried ailerons and there were automatic slots on the upper one. The lower wing was cranked, with negative dihedral over a short centre section, and the main undercarriage legs joined the wing at the end of this section. The main undercarriage was split, a necessary feature in a torpedo bomber carrying its long weapon under its fuselage; there was a small tailwheel. The square-section fuselage was of steel tube construction, aluminium covered at the front and canvas covered at the rear. Somewhat unusually, the fuselage filled the space between the wings, deep enough for a spacious, windowed cabin for the observer/navigator. This cabin was between both the wings and the two cockpits; the pilot sat forward of the upper wing, with his head above it and the gunner's position was well aft of the trailing edge. The latter had a ring-mounted .303 in (7.7 mm) Lewis Gun, and there was an unusual metal cowl that could be slid rearwards to protect him from the elements when the gun was not in use. There was also a single, forward-firing .303 in (7.7 mm) machine gun operated by the pilot. At the nose, the fuselage diameter decreased to the engine mounting, holding a supercharged 810 hp (600 kW) Armstrong Siddeley Tiger IV. It was enclosed in a long chord cowling.

The A.W.19 first flew on 26 February 1934. (Note: Both Lewis and Wixey state that the A.W.19 first flew on 28 February) It flew well, but suffered from engine overheating, with the unreliability of the Tiger placing the aircraft at a disadvantage compared to aircraft powered by the Bristol Pegasus. While the prototype A.W.19 was purchased by the Air Ministry in 1935, no further production followed, either for the A.W.19, or for any other of the types developed against the specification. While 150 Vickers Type 253s were ordered in August, Vickers had, in the three years since the specification's release produced the monoplane Vickers Wellesley as a private venture, and in September 1935, the order for the Vickers Type 253 was replaced by one for 96 Wellesleys, which were classed as medium bombers, abandoning all the general purpose requirements of the earlier specification. The A.W.19 continued in its manufacturer's service as a test bed for the Tiger engines. A Tiger VI was installed in 1935 and a Tiger VII in 1935; it continued as a test bed until June 1940.

== Specifications ==
Data from

General characteristics

- Crew: 2 or 3
- Length: 42 ft 2 in (12.85 m)
- Wingspan: 49 ft 8 in (15.14 m)
- Height: 13 ft 0 in (3.96 m)
- Wing area: 654 sq ft (60.8 m^{2})
- Empty weight: 4,298 lb (1,950 kg)
- Gross weight: 19,290 lb (8,750 kg)
- Powerplant: 1 × Armstrong Siddeley Tiger IV 14-cylinder radial engine, 810 hp (600 kW)

Performance

- Maximum speed: 163 mph (262 km/h, 142 kn) at 6,000 ft (1,800 m)
- Service ceiling: 21,000 ft (6,400 m)
- Time to altitude: 8.8 min to 10,000 ft (3,000 m)

Armament

- Guns: 1 × 0.303 in (7.7 mm) machine gun firing through propeller and 1 × 0.303 in (7.7 mm) ring-mounted Lewis Gun in rear cockpit
- Bombs:
  - 1 × 2,000 lb (907 kg) torpedo or 1 × 1,000 lb (454 kg) bomb under fuselage
  - up to 1,000 lb (454 kg) bombs in under-wing racks
