= Boulton Paul Mailplane =

P.64 Mailplane
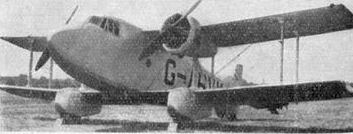

General information
- Type: Mail plane/Light Transport
- Manufacturer: Boulton & Paul Ltd
- Designer: J D North
- Number built: 1

History
- First flight: March 1933
- Retired: October 1933
- Developed into: Boulton Paul P.71A

The Boulton & Paul P.64 Mailplane also known as the Mail-Carrier was a 1930s British twin-engined all-metal biplane transport aircraft designed for Imperial Airways and built by Boulton & Paul Ltd.

== Development ==
The airline had a requirement, which was translated into Air Ministry specification 21/28, for a mailplane to carry a 1,000 pounds (450 kg) payload on a 1,000 miles (1,600 km) leg at a speed of at least 150 miles per hour (240 km/h). Boulton & Paul designed and constructed the prototype P.64 Mailplane to address these requirements. The P.64 was a twin-engine two-bay equi-span biplane. It was powered by two Bristol Pegasus IM2 supercharged radial engines rated at 555 horsepower (414 kW) driving two-bladed fixed pitch propellers and mounted under the upper wings.

The aircraft (registered G-ABYK) first flew in March 1933 at the company Norwich. It was not a success, deemed to be expensive and unsatisfactory. It was destroyed during trials at Martlesham Heath when it struck the ground during an unexplained dive on 21 October 1933.

The company then addressed the specification's requirements with a new design transport aircraft which was lighter, slimmer and longer (the Boulton Paul P.71A).

== Specifications (P.64 Mailplane) ==
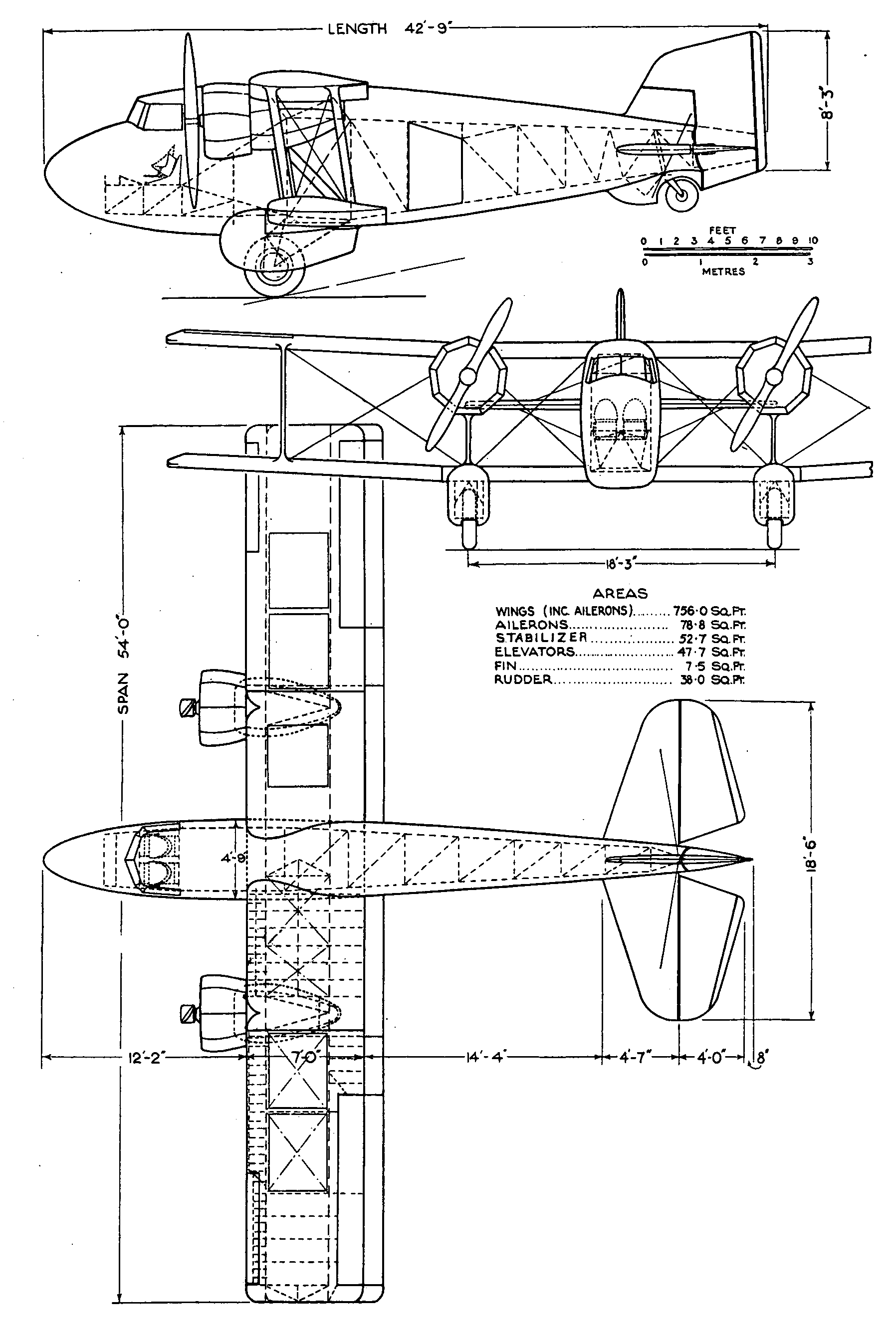
Boulton Paul P.64 Mailplane 3-view drawing from NACA-AC-177

Data from Boulton Paul Aircraft since 1915

General characteristics

- Crew: 3 (2 pilots plus navigator or radio operator)
- Length: 42 ft 6 in (12.95 m)
- Wingspan: 54 ft (16 m)
- Height: 13 ft (4.0 m)
- Wing area: 756 sq ft (70.2 m^{2})
- Empty weight: 7,008 lb (3,179 kg)
- Gross weight: 11,267 lb (5,111 kg)
- Powerplant: 2 × Bristol Pegasus I.M2 9-cyl. air-cooled radial piston engine, 555 hp (414 kW) each

Performance

- Maximum speed: 185 mph (298 km/h, 161 kn) at 5,000 ft (1,524 m)
- Range: 1,000 mi (1,600 km, 870 nmi)
- Service ceiling: 22,500 ft (6,900 m)
- Rate of climb: 1,400 ft/min (7.1 m/s)

== See also ==
Related development

- Boulton Paul P.71A
