= Armstrong Whitworth Ensign =

1938 British four-engine monoplane airliner

A.W.27 Ensign
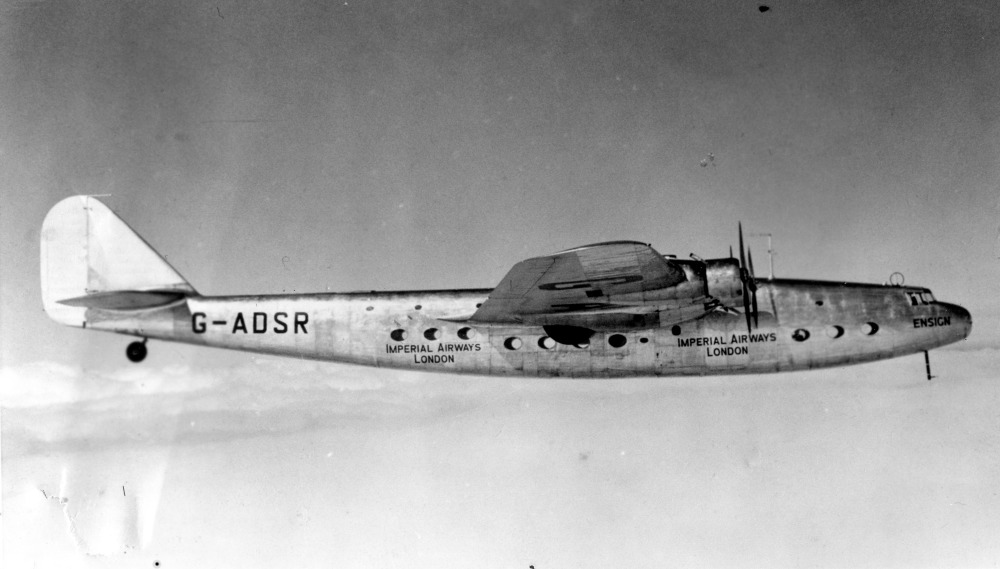

General information
- Type: Airliner
- Manufacturer: Armstrong Whitworth Aircraft
- Primary users: Imperial Airways British Overseas Airways Corporation (BOAC)
- Number built: 14

History
- Manufactured: 1938-1940
- Introduction date: 1938
- First flight: 24 January 1938
- Retired: 1946

The Armstrong Whitworth A.W.27 Ensign was a British four-engine monoplane airliner and the largest airliner built in Britain during the Interwar period.

The British airline Imperial Airways requested tenders for a large monoplane airliner with four Armstrong Siddeley Tiger engines in 1934. Armstrong Whitworth designed the Ensign to seat up to 40 passengers for the airline's European and Asian routes while also carrying airmail. It connected Britain with seaplane flights that continued on to Australia and South Africa. Early operations were hindered by mechanical problems and modifications only ever marginally improved performance and reliability.

During the Second World War, the Ensigns were operated by the British Overseas Airways Corporation (BOAC), which had been formed out of the merger of Imperial Airways and British Airways. The type would be flown between Britain and various locations in the Middle East, Africa and India, often in support of military operations. During 1940, two Ensigns were destroyed by enemy action, while one would be captured in 1942 and subsequently operated by the French. The Ensigns were retired following a final passenger flight in June 1946 and the remaining aircraft were scrapped the following year.

== Development ==
=== Background ===
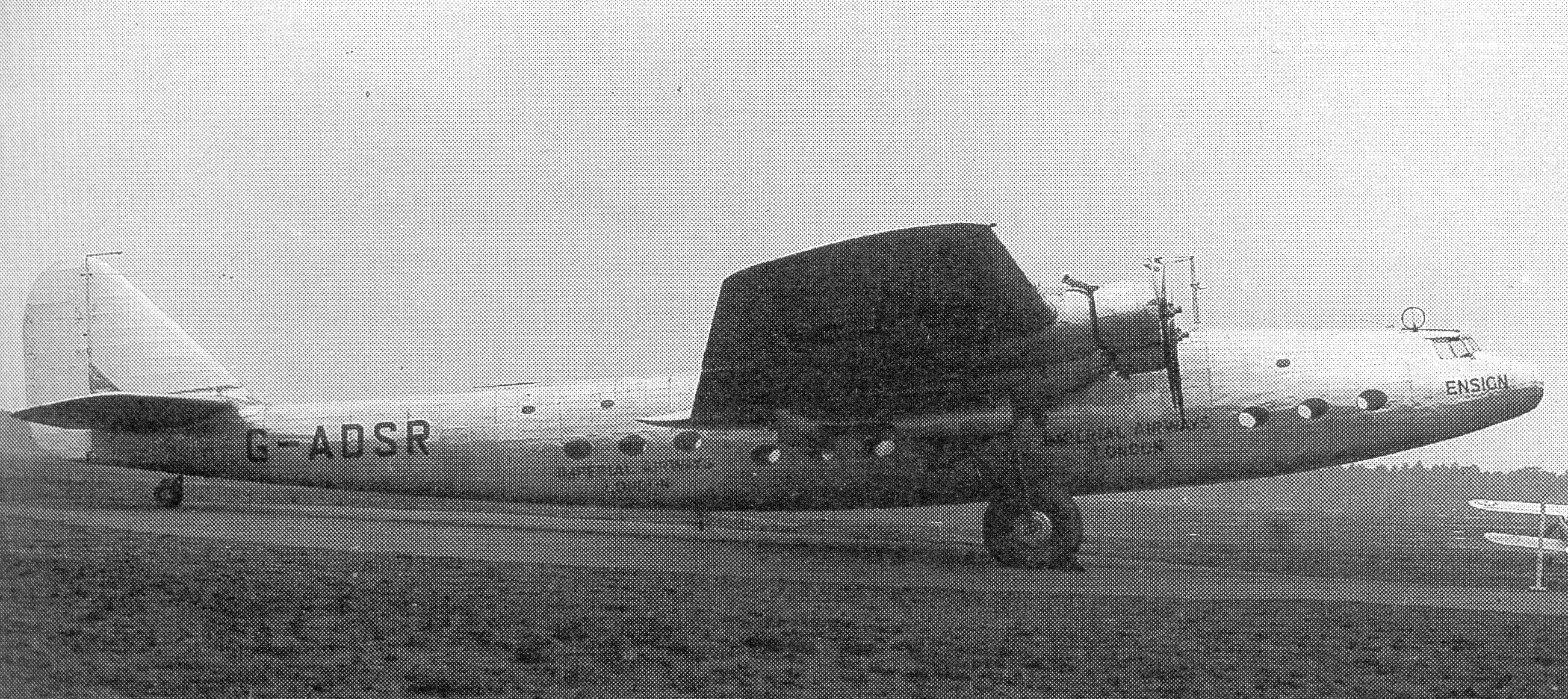
Armstrong Whitworth A.W.27 Ensign G-ADSR Ensign at the time of its rollout, in 1938

The Ensign's origins can be traced to 1934 when Imperial Airways expressed a need for a large monoplane airliner powered by four Armstrong Siddeley Tiger radial engines. The airline was expanding and modernizing its fleet, driven in part by the obsolescence of its biplane airliners, such as the Handley Page H.P.42, and a new British Government policy stipulating that first class mail with the Empire travel by air. Imperial Airways also issued a specification for a large flying boat, which became the Short Empire. Imperial Airways approached Armstrong Whitworth directly and various configurations were examined including several low-wing monoplanes with two, three and four engines, but Imperial Airways' managing director insisted on a four-engine shoulder wing monoplane, as this was expected to be more popular with passengers.

Imperial Airways paid £27,000 for the design work, and a further £43,300 for the construction of the first example on 22 September 1934, with delivery anticipated in 1936. In May 1935, an order for eleven more aircraft, at £37,000 each, was issued, and in December 1936, a final order for an additional two aircraft, priced at £39,766 13 shillings 4 pence each, brought the number of aircraft ordered to 14.

In October 1934, a final specification was drawn up with particular attention being paid to the positioning of the tailplanes in relation to the wing as well as avoiding wing flutter and tail buffeting. Mass-balanced flight controls were adopted to avoid flutter, while wing fillets smoothed airflow along the fuselage. The structure was built to meet military strength requirements. Performance guarantees required a cruise speed of 155 mph (249 km/h) at 5,000 ft (1,500 m), and a take-off distance of under 320 yd (290 m).

During the late 1930s, production of Whitley bombers for the Royal Air Force had priority, which slowed work on the Ensign, and due to a lack of production capacity, assembly was not undertaken at Armstrong Whitworth's main factory in Coventry, but at another member of the Hawker-Siddeley group, Air Service Training in Hamble.

Throughout its development, changes were being requested by Imperial Airways, which delayed progress by up to two years, and the Ensign didn't make its first flight until 24 January 1938.

The two Mark.IIs saw their service entry being further delayed by Imperial Airways and Armstrong Whitworth studying their use as piggyback motherships in the same manner as the Short Mayo Composite's Maia, carrying a smaller long-range parasite aircraft. However this idea was abandoned before any changes were completed. Due to this delay, Everest only flew on 20 June 1940 and Enterprise did not make its first flight until 28 October.

=== Flight testing and production ===
The Ensign's first flight revealed heavy ailerons, and an excessively heavy rudder which was resolved with an adjustment to its servo. The undercarriage was retracted for the first time on the second flight and was subject to exhaustive tests before being passed to the Aeroplane and Armament Experimental Establishment (A&AEE) for Air Ministry testing. During testing, the elevators intermittently jammed while at altitude, which was resolved by modifying the connecting wire runs, to account for the fuselage contracting due to the cold. A disaster was narrowly averted on 8 March 1938, when all four engines cut out due to an incorrect fuel cock settings, and the aircraft glided to RAF Bicester, making a dead-stick landing.

Flight testing of the prototype found its handling characteristics to be generally acceptable, although Royal Air Force pilots criticised its slow climb rate, which was attributable to the Tiger XI engines that left it underpowered. Upon completion of the flight testing, the type was issued a certificate of airworthiness, clearing it for operational use, following the completion of a redesign of the trailing edge covering, the installation of an engine-driven compressor to charge the brakes, throttle control locks, and additional passenger escape hatches. Once completed, the aircraft made its first airline service flight between Croydon Airport and Paris, France on 24 October 1938.

== Design ==
Video of A.W.27 Ensign, including original news story introduction to public

The Ensign was a high-wing cantilever monoplane of light alloy construction and an oval fuselage with a conventional tailplane. The cantilever structure of the wings was built around a single massive internally braced box spar attached directly to both the front and rear ribs. The leading edge of the wing was metal, but aft of the box spar, the wing was covered by fabric, as were the tailplane and fin. Otherwise, it featured semi-monocoque construction, using a combination of stressed skin, transverse frames, and longitudinal stringers. The wing was recessed into the top of a very deep fuselage, while tubular girders provided the floor with the necessary strength.

The Ensign had a hydraulically retractable undercarriage which folded into the nacelles of the inner engines, and a castoring tail wheel. Considerable difficulties with the retraction mechanism were encountered and the wheels on the undercarriage were the largest to have been produced in the UK at that time, with Dunlop wheels and tyres 6 ft 3 in (1.91 m) tall. While most components were designed and manufactured by Armstrong Whitworth, the 16 hydraulic jacks used for the flaps, undercarriage legs, locks and doors were Lockheed units sourced locally. Retraction was often uneven and unpredictable and took significantly longer than specified.

The Ensign was initially powered by four 800 hp (600 kW) moderately supercharged Armstrong Siddeley Tiger XI 14 cylinder two-row radial engines of 1,996 cu in (32.71 L) displacement mounted ahead of the wing leading edge on a tubular steel framework with flexible rubber mountings and enclosed in Siddeley long chord cowlings. These engines drove de Havilland three-blade two-position adjustable pitch propellers. When it was found to leave the aircraft underpowered, these were replaced when the aircraft were returned to Armstrong Whitworth to resolve numerous mechanical problems, with 855 hp (638 kW) Armstrong Siddeley Tiger XIC engines, (Note: The main differences between the two engines was that supercharger boost on takeoff was raised from 2.5 to 3.5 lb/in (0.045 to 0.063 kg/mm), and rocker arm bracket bolts were replaced with studs, a common point of failure on the initial version.) and constant speed propellers although these didn't fully resolve the problem, and the final two aircraft ordered by Imperial Airways in 1936 were equipped with 1,820 cu in (29.8 L) 9 cylinder single bank 950 hp (710 kW) Wright GR-1820-G102A Cyclone geared radial engines and Hamilton constant speed propellers, as A.W.27A Ensign Mk.IIs and all eight surviving Mk.I aircraft were upgraded between 1941 and 1943 to Mk.II standard with the American engines. This improved performance finally allowed the Ensign to be used in hot climates, however production of the engine ended early in the war, and not only did finding spares become difficult, but the rate of climb still generated complaints by the pilots. A boiler to produce steam was fitted to the engine exhaust, which was channelled through the aircraft to provide heat. An auxiliary petrol-driven generator supplied electricity for lighting and to recharge the aircraft's batteries while on the ground.

The cockpit seated two pilots, side-by-side who were provided with dual controls, along with a radio operator seated sideways behind the copilot, on the right side of the aircraft. The radio operator had a Marconi wireless transmitter/receiver, radio direction finding (RDF) equipment, and on empire routes, also operated a short-wave radio. It was intended for the Ensign to be operated by a crew of five with two pilots, a radio operator, a steward, and a flight clerk. On the Eastern route a second steward replaced the flight clerk.

Eight aircraft were fitted for Empire routes and four for European routes. The former carried 27 passengers in three cabins or 20 sleeping in bunks, while the latter spread 40 passengers across four main cabins. Armstrong Whitworth claimed that the interior could be reconfigured between each type, including the installation of partition walls and curtains, in 15 minutes. Chair cushions became bunk bed mattresses, and could serve as flotation devices in a ditching. The centre section had a large freight compartment aligned with the engines to reduce noise penetration, a pantry, a lavatory on the starboard side, and a narrow corridor sometimes referred to as the 'promenade' deck between the forward and rear compartments. On Empire routes a flight clerk replaced a steward. Aside from the interior setup chosen and the installation of a short-wave radio, there was little difference between the two variants.

== Operational history ==
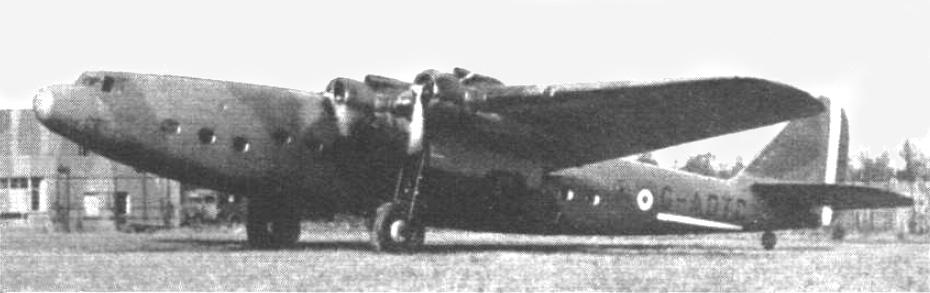
Ensign Mark.I, G-ADTC Endymion in 1940 with wartime camouflage and roundels

Imperial Airways named the prototype "Ensign", which also became the Class name for the type, as was their standard practice. Three more Ensigns – G-ADSS Egeria, G-ADST Elsinore and G-ADSU Euterpe were completed by Christmas 1938, and were dispatched to Australia with the holiday mail, but all three suffered mechanical problems that prevented them from reaching their destinations. Elsinore was returned home, over a distance of 2,500 mi (4,000 km), with its undercarriage lowered as they could not be retracted. Consequently, Imperial Airways returned all five to Armstrong Whitworth, where control runs were modified, rudder area reduced, new constant-speed propellers and more powerful 935 hp (697 kW) Armstrong Siddeley Tiger IXC engines were fitted to improve performance. The modified aircraft were evaluated at Martlesham Heath, during which the type's rate of climb was improved while the use of automatic mixture controls, modifications to the priming system, the installation of constant speed propellers and the replacement of bolts with studs in the engine rocker arm brackets greatly improved reliability.

From June 1939, the Ensigns were re-delivered to Imperial Airways, along with the sixth aircraft built. The airline had changed its deployment plans for the type though, and was dropping the Eastern routes. Plans for four Ensigns to operate with Indian Trans-Continental Airways from Calcutta, were also cancelled, although registrations and new names had been assigned and, in the case of Euralus, the Indian registration VT-AJG was painted on the aircraft before being repainted again with its British identity. By September 1939, eleven had been delivered.

Following the start of the Second World War, the entire fleet was stored in October 1939, at Baginton Aerodrome while officials considered their contribution to the war effort. Each Ensign would be camouflaged and used on a new route from Heston Aerodrome to Le Bourget Airport, Paris. The aircraft returned to service after the formation of British Overseas Airways Corporation (BOAC) in November under civilian control under the direction of National Air Communications instead of being impressed into military service. It was at this time, in 1940, that several were operated by No.24 Squadron RAF crews, although no serials numbers were assigned.

With the Germans invading the Low Countries, supplies were ferried to France, followed by evacuation flights ahead of the German occupation of France in June. Three Ensigns were destroyed by enemy action in 1940. G-ADSX Ettrick and G-ADSZ Elysian were lost in France, and G-ADTC Endymion at Bristol Whitchurch in November 1940. Ettrick had been abandoned at Le Bourget after being damaged by bombs on 1 June 1940, and was rumoured to have been used by Germany, and even given Daimler-Benz engines. a myth refuted by photographs of the burnt out wreck taken shortly after the arrival of the Germans.

All eight surviving aircraft were re-engined during 1941–43 with and as they were completed they were transferred to the Middle East on BOAC's Africa to India routes.

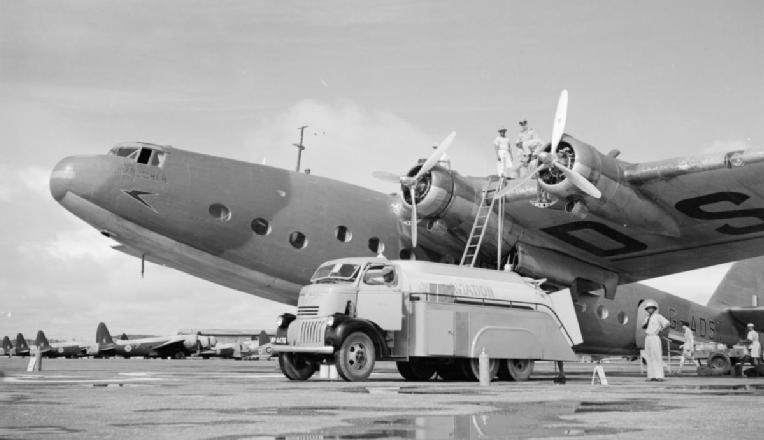
Ensign Mark.II, G-ADSV Explorer being refuelled at Accra in the Gold Coast (now Ghana)

Following engine trouble in which three engines lost power and began leaking oil during a 3 February 1942 flight that had been following the Takoradi route between Egypt and the British colony in Ghana, Enterprise made a forced belly landing in the Vichy-controlled French West Africa desert about 300 mi (480 km) short of its destination, near Nouakchott, now the capital of Mauritania but at the time a small fishing village. Incriminating paperwork was destroyed, and the crew were taken on to Bathurst in Gambia by an RAF Short Sunderland flying boat. Enterprise was found by a Vichy French patrol on 12 February 1942 and repaired at Dakar where it was briefly used by the Armée de l'Air de Vichy before being handed over to Air France in July 1942, when it was named Nouakchott, and the first letter of its registration was temporarily altered from a G for Great Britain to an F for France. After serving for several months in Mauritania, it was flown to France in October 1942, and the French authorities issued a certificate of airworthiness in November 1942, however before it could return to revenue service, the Germans invaded Vichy France in December 1942, and despite being hastily relocated, it was captured by the Germans along with 1876 other French aircraft. Deutsche Luft Hansa was invited to evaluate the captured aircraft in early 1943, but they saw it as an obsolete model that had been restored by the French, and its older Cyclone engines were more useful to them in the Douglas DC-3s they were still operating. The engines were removed from the airframe, which was scrapped by the Germans in Montaudran, near Toulouse in December 1943 without it being flown again.

During their Certificate of Airworthiness overhauls it was found that the combination of camouflage dope and heat was accelerating the degradation of the fabric surfaces, and thereafter the Ensigns returned to a silver finish. After the end of the war, in part due to performance and maintenance difficulties with their fabric surfaces and the now obsolete engines, it was decided to withdraw them from service and to return them to the UK. Euterpe, which had been parked since February 1945, was cannibalized to repair the others.

From 1944, the Ensigns were used between Cairo and Calcutta and the final Ensign passenger flight was in June 1946 when G-ADSW Eddystone flew from Cairo to Hurn via Marseille, after being delayed in the Middle East by repairs. Conversion of the Ensigns was considered and they were offered for sale, but operating costs were too much for those who showed interest. The aircraft were broken up at Hamble in March and April 1947 and reduced to scrap.

== Accidents and incidents ==
- On 15 December 1939, G-ADSU Euterpe was damaged in a forced landing, and in December 1939, it was reported to be at Bonniksen's Airfield near RAF Chipping Warden with a damaged undercarriage.
- On 23 May 1940, G-ADSZ Elysean was attacked by three Luftwaffe Messerschmitt Bf 109 fighters while on the ground at Merville, Nord, France and was burned out.
- On 23 May 1940, G-ADTA Euryalus was damaged in a crash at RAF Lympne, Kent. It was one of six aircraft that survived a Luftwaffe raid on Merville Airfield, but not without sustaining damage. The intended destination was Croydon but off the English coast, the port inner engine failed and the pilot diverted for RAF Hawkinge. The starboard inner engine then also failed and the pilot changed course for Lympne. On landing, the starboard undercarriage failed to lock down, causing the wing to drag on the ground and the aircraft to go through a fence. Euryalus was flown to RAF Hamble in June, but it was decided to cannibalise her to repair G-ADSU Euterpe which had previously been damaged in December 1939. Euryalus was officially written off on 15 November 1941 and scrapped in September 1942.
- On 1 June 1940, G-ADSX Ettrick was abandoned at Le Bourget Airport, Paris, France due to the runway being strewn with time-delay bombs, and the burnt-out wreck was photographed shortly afterwards.
- On 9 November 1941, G-AFZU Everest was attacked by a Luftwaffe Heinkel He 111 over the Bay of Biscay. A safe landing was made at RAF Portreath, Cornwall and the aircraft was repaired and returned to service.
- On 1 February 1942, G-AFZV Enterprise made a forced landing near Nouakchott due to engine problems. The crew were rescued, and the aircraft was salvaged by the French and entered service with Air France before being captured by the Germans in December 1942, who stripped it of its engines and scrapped it.
- On 4 September 1942, G-ADSR Ensign sustained damage following an accidental undercarriage retraction while stationary in Nigeria. It was quickly returned to service, but during a major Certificate of Airworthiness overhaul in September 1944, the damage was found to be more substantial than initially realised. Work was abandoned, and the airframe scrapped on 3 January 1945.
- On 1 January 1946, G-ADSW Eddystone was making its final paying flight home before being withdrawn from service, but had its undercarriage fail after departing Cairo for England, resulting in a belly landing being made at RAF Castel Benito in Tripoli Repairs took until 3 June 1946, when it departed on the last flight made by an Ensign, for the UK, and the scrap yard.

== Variants ==
A.W.27 Ensign Mk.I
Powered by four 800 hp (600 kW) Armstrong Siddeley Tiger IX or 850 hp (630 kW) Armstrong Siddeley Tiger IXC radial piston engines.
A.W.27A Ensign Mk.II
Powered by four 950 hp (710 kW) Wright GR-1820-G102A Cyclone radial piston engines.

== List of aircraft ==
List of Armstrong Whitworth Ensigns
| Name | Registration(s) | Operator(s) | Type | Notes |
|---|---|---|---|---|
| Mk.I | | | | |
| Ensign | G-ADSR | Imperial Airways/BOAC | Eastern/Empire type | Converted to Mk.II. Out of service in 1944 |
| Egeria (Note: Four aircraft were assigned Indian registrations starting with the letters VT, and in two cases ('Ellora' and Etah), names, for use by Indian Trans-Continental Airways out of Karachi, but the planned delivery was cancelled.) | G-ADSS | Imperial Airways/BOAC | Eastern/Empire type | Initially assigned registration VT-AJE and named Ellora. Converted to Mk.II |
| Elsinore | G-ADST | Imperial Airways/BOAC | Eastern/Empire type | Converted to Mk.II |
| Euterpe | G-ADSU | Imperial Airways/BOAC | Eastern/Empire type | Initially assigned VT-AJF. Converted to Mk.II |
| Explorer | G-ADSV | Imperial Airways/BOAC | Eastern/Empire type | Converted to Mk.II |
| Eddystone | G-ADSW | Imperial Airways/BOAC | Western/European type | Converted to Mk.II |
| Ettrick | G-ADSX | Imperial Airways/BOAC | Western/European type | Abandoned and destroyed 1940 |
| Empyrean | G-ADSY | Imperial Airways/BOAC | Western/European type | Converted to Mk.II |
| Elysian | G-ADSZ | Imperial Airways/BOAC | Western/European type | Destroyed by enemy action May 1940 |
| Euralus | G-ADTA | Imperial Airways/BOAC | Eastern/Empire type | Initially assigned VT-AJG. Written off November 1941 |
| Echo | G-ADTB | Imperial Airways/BOAC | Eastern/Empire type | Converted to Mk.II |
| Endymion | G-ADTC | Imperial Airways/BOAC | Eastern/Empire type | Initially assigned VT-AJH and named Etah |
| Mk.II | | | | |
| Everest | G-AFZU | BOAC | | Assigned G-ADTE but not used |
| Enterprise/ Nouakchott | G-AFZV; F-AFZV/F-BAHD | BOAC/ Armée de l'Air/Air France | | Assigned G-ADTD but not used |

== Operators ==
Vichy France

- Armée de l'Air de Vichy
- Air France

United Kingdom

- British Overseas Airways Corporation (BOAC)
- Imperial Airways London (IAL)
- Royal Air Force (RAF)
  - No. 24 Squadron RAF

== Specifications (A.W.27A Mk.II) ==
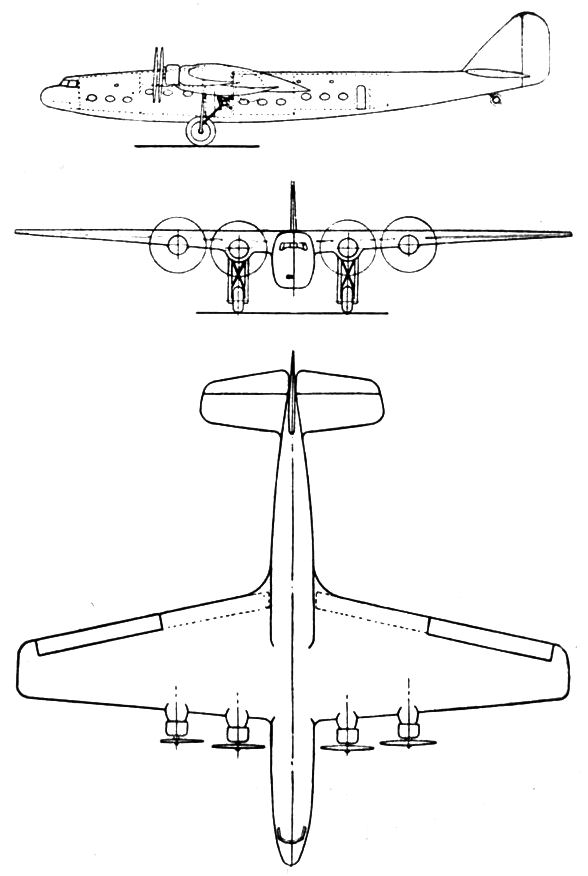
Armstrong Whitworth A.W.27 3-view drawing from L'Aerophile June 1937

Data from Jane's Fighting Aircraft of World War II, Armstrong Whitworth Aircraft since 1913

General characteristics

- Crew: 5 (captain, first officer, radio operator, two cabin stewards)
- Capacity:
  - European/Western routes: 40 passengers in four cabins
  - Empire/Eastern routes: 27 passengers in three cabins with sleeping accommodations.
- Length: 114 ft 0 in (34.75 m)
- Wingspan: 123 ft 0 in (37.49 m)
- Height: 23 ft 0 in (7.01 m)
- Wing area: 2,450 sq ft (228 m^{2})
- Empty weight: 35,075 lb (15,910 kg) (Note: Moss and Tapper give a lower weight: 36,586 lb (16,595 kg) and 36,590 lb (16,600 kg) respectively)
- Gross weight: 55,500 lb (25,174 kg)
- Max takeoff weight: 66,000 lb (29,937 kg)
- Fuel capacity: 670 imp gal (800 US gal; 3,000 L) (in wing leading edges)
- Oil capacity: 40 imp gal (48 US gal; 180 L)
- Powerplant: 4 × Wright GR-1820-G102A geared radial engines, 950 hp (710 kW) each
- Propellers: 3-bladed Hamilton 23E50 107 propellers

Performance

- Maximum speed: 210 mph (340 km/h, 180 kn) at 6,700 ft (2,000 m)
- Cruise speed: 180 mph (290 km/h, 160 kn) at 5,000 ft (1,500 m)
- Range: 1,370 mi (2,200 km, 1,190 nmi) at 173 mph (278 km/h) and 5,000 ft (1,500 m)
- Service ceiling: 24,000 ft (7,300 m) fully loaded
- Rate of climb: 900 ft/min (4.6 m/s) at sea level

== See also ==
Aircraft of comparable role, configuration, and era

- Avro 642 Eighteen
- Avro York
- Bloch MB.160
- Boeing 307 Stratoliner
- de Havilland Albatross
- Douglas DC-4E
- Focke-Wulf Fw 200 Condor
- Junkers Ju 90

Related lists

- List of civil aircraft
