= Bristol Draco =

1930s British piston aircraft engine

Draco
- Type: Piston aircraft engine
- Manufacturer: Bristol Aeroplane Company
- First run: 1935
- Major applications: Westland Wapiti (testbed only)

The Bristol Draco was an air-cooled nine-cylinder radial engine from the British manufacturer Bristol Aeroplane Company. It was essentially a version of their famous Pegasus converted to use a fuel injection system.

The carburettor had only a simple butterfly valve, while two injection pumps supplied the cylinders with fuel, one handling four cylinders and the other, five. Injection was into the manifold before they split into the two intake valves for each cylinder. The engine was flight-tested in a Westland Wapiti. Since the expenditure did not bring a considerable improvement, development was halted.

== Specifications (Draco) ==
Data from Lumsden.

=== General characteristics ===
- Type: nine-cylinder air-cooled radial engine.
- Bore: 5.75 in (146 mm)
- Stroke: 7.5 in (190 mm)
- Displacement: 1,753 cu in (28.7 L)
- Length: 43.5 in (1,105 mm)
- Diameter: 55.5 in (1,410 mm)
- Dry weight: 1,093 lb (495.8 kg)
- Designer: Roy Fedden

=== Components ===
- Valvetrain: Overhead valve
- Supercharger: Medium supercharged
- Fuel system: Fuel injected
- Cooling system: Air-cooled
- Reduction gear: Geared epicyclic, reduction ratio 0.5:1, left hand tractor

=== Performance ===
- Power output: 570 hp at 2,000 rpm
- Compression ratio: 5.3:1
- Power-to-weight ratio: 0.52 hp/lb

== See also ==
Related development

- Bristol Pegasus

Related lists

- List of aircraft engines
