= Bristol Phoenix =

1920s British piston aircraft engine

Phoenix
- Type: Diesel aircraft engine
- Manufacturer: Bristol Aeroplane Company
- First run: 1928
- Major applications: Westland Wapiti

The Phoenix was an experimental version of the Bristol Aeroplane Company's Pegasus engine, adapted to run on the Diesel cycle. Only a few were built between 1928 and 1932, although samples fitted to a Westland Wapiti held the altitude record for diesel-powered aircraft at 27,453 ft (8,368 m) from 11 May 1934 until World War II. The primary advantage of the Phoenix was better fuel efficiency at cruise, by up to 35%.

== Variants ==
- Phoenix I: Diesel version of the Pegasus IF, 380 hp.
- Phoenix IIM: Medium-supercharged diesel version of Pegasus IM, 470 hp.

== Applications ==
- Westland Wapiti

== Specifications (Phoenix I) ==
Data from Lumsden

=== General characteristics ===
- Type: nine-cylinder air-cooled Diesel radial engine
- Bore: 5.75 in (146 mm)
- Stroke: 7.5 in (190 mm)
- Displacement: 1,753 in^{3} (28.7 L)
- Length: 43.75 in (1,111 mm)
- Diameter: 55.25 in (1,403 mm)
- Dry weight: 1,067 lb (484 kg)

=== Components ===
- Valvetrain: Overhead valve, two intake and two exhaust valves per cylinder, pushrod-actuated.
- Fuel type: Diesel
- Cooling system: Air-cooled

=== Performance ===
- Power output: 380 hp (283 kW) at 2,000 rpm at sea level
- Specific power: 0.22 hp/in^{3} (9.9 kW/L)
- Compression ratio: 14:1
- Power-to-weight ratio: 0.36 hp/lb (0.6 kW/kg)

== See also ==
Comparable engines

- BMW 114-V4
- Packard DR-980

Related lists

- List of aircraft engines
