= Armstrong Siddeley Tiger =

1930s British piston aircraft engine

Tiger
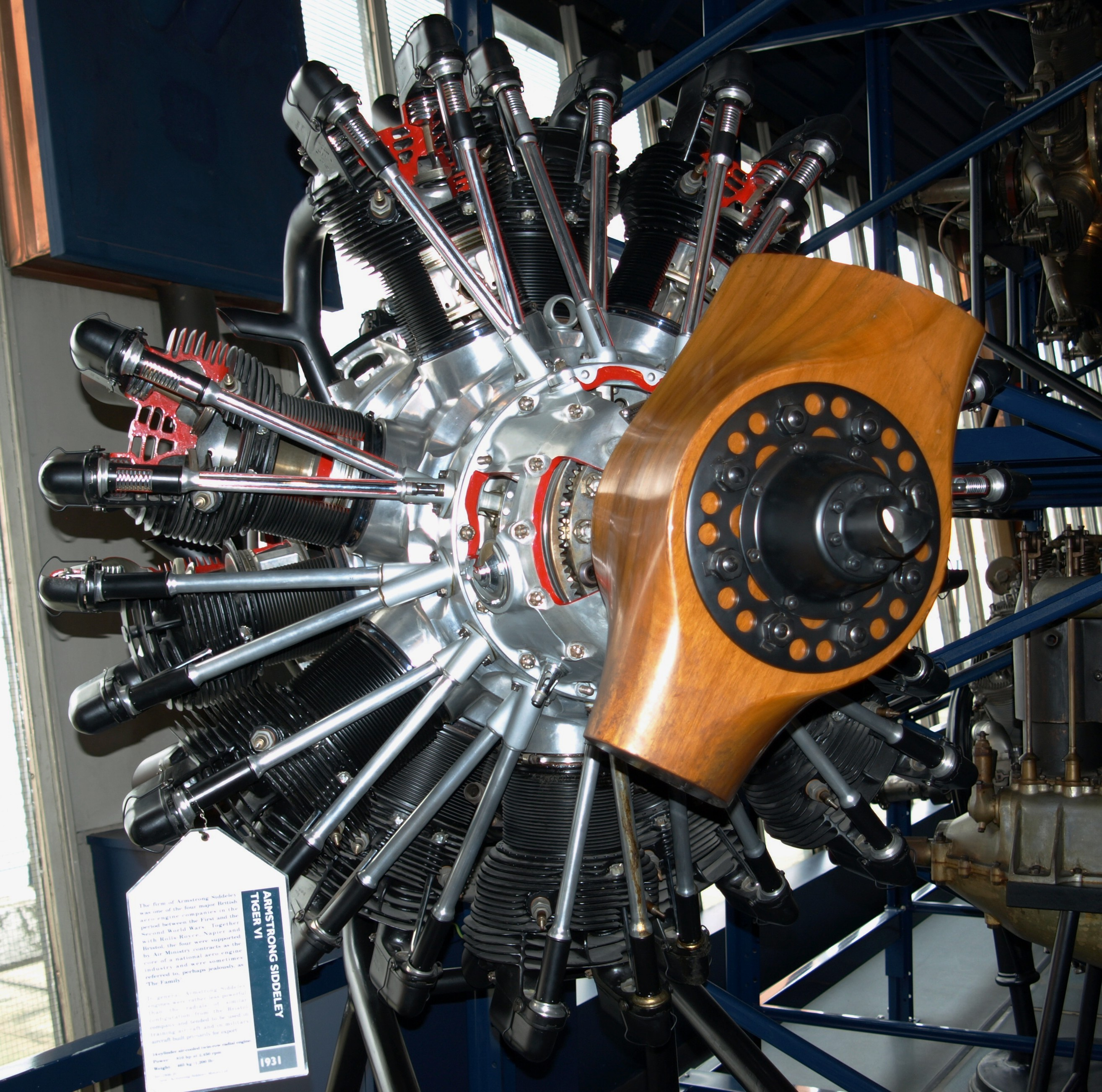
- Armstrong Siddeley Tiger at the Science Museum (London)
- Type: Radial engine
- Manufacturer: Armstrong Siddeley
- First run: 1932
- Major applications: Armstrong Whitworth Ensign; Blackburn Shark

The Armstrong Siddeley Tiger was a British 14-cylinder air-cooled aircraft radial engine developed by Armstrong Siddeley in the 1930s from their Jaguar engine. The engine was built in a number of different versions but performance and dimensions stayed relatively unchanged. The Tiger VIII was the first British aircraft engine to use a two-speed supercharger.

== Applications ==
- Armstrong Whitworth A.W.19
- Armstrong Whitworth AW.23
- Armstrong Whitworth A.W.29
- Armstrong Whitworth Ensign
- Armstrong Whitworth Whitley
- Blackburn B-6
- Blackburn B-7
- Blackburn Shark
- Blackburn Ripon
- Fairey G4/31
- Handley Page H.P.51
- Short Calcutta

== Engines on display ==
A preserved Armstrong Siddeley Tiger is on display at the Science Museum, London.

== Specifications (Tiger VIII) ==
Data from Lumsden.

=== General characteristics ===
- Type: 14-cylinder supercharged two-row air-cooled radial engine
- Bore: 5.5 in (139.7 mm)
- Stroke: 6.0 in (152.4 mm)
- Displacement: 1,995 in³ (32.7 L)
- Length: 64.6 in (1,641 mm)
- Diameter: 50.8 in (1,290 mm)
- Dry weight: 1,287 lb (584 kg)

=== Components ===
- Valvetrain: Two pushrod-actuated valves per cylinder
- Supercharger: Two-speed centrifugal type supercharger, first gear ratio 5.34:1, second gear 7.96:1.
- Fuel system: Claudel-Hobson carburettor
- Fuel type: 87 octane rating petrol
- Cooling system: Air-cooled
- Reduction gear: Spur, 0.594:1

=== Performance ===
- Power output:
- 907 hp (677 kW) at 2,375 rpm for takeoff
- 850 hp (634 kW) at 2,450 rpm at 7,150 ft (2,180 m) – first supercharger gear
- 771 hp (575 kW) at 2,450 rpm at 16,240 ft (4,950 m) – second supercharger gear
- 582 hp (434 kW) at 2,200 rpm economy cruise
- Specific power: 0.45 hp/in³ (20.7 kW/L)
- Compression ratio: 6.25:1
- Specific fuel consumption: 0.49 lb/(hp•h) (294 g/(kW•h))
- Oil consumption: 0.21–0.42 oz/(hp•h) (8–16 g/(kW•h))
- Power-to-weight ratio: 0.70 hp/lb (1.16 kW/kg)

== See also ==
Related development

- Armstrong Siddeley Jaguar
- Armstrong Siddeley Panther

Related lists

- List of aircraft engines
