= Boulton Paul P.71A =

P.71A
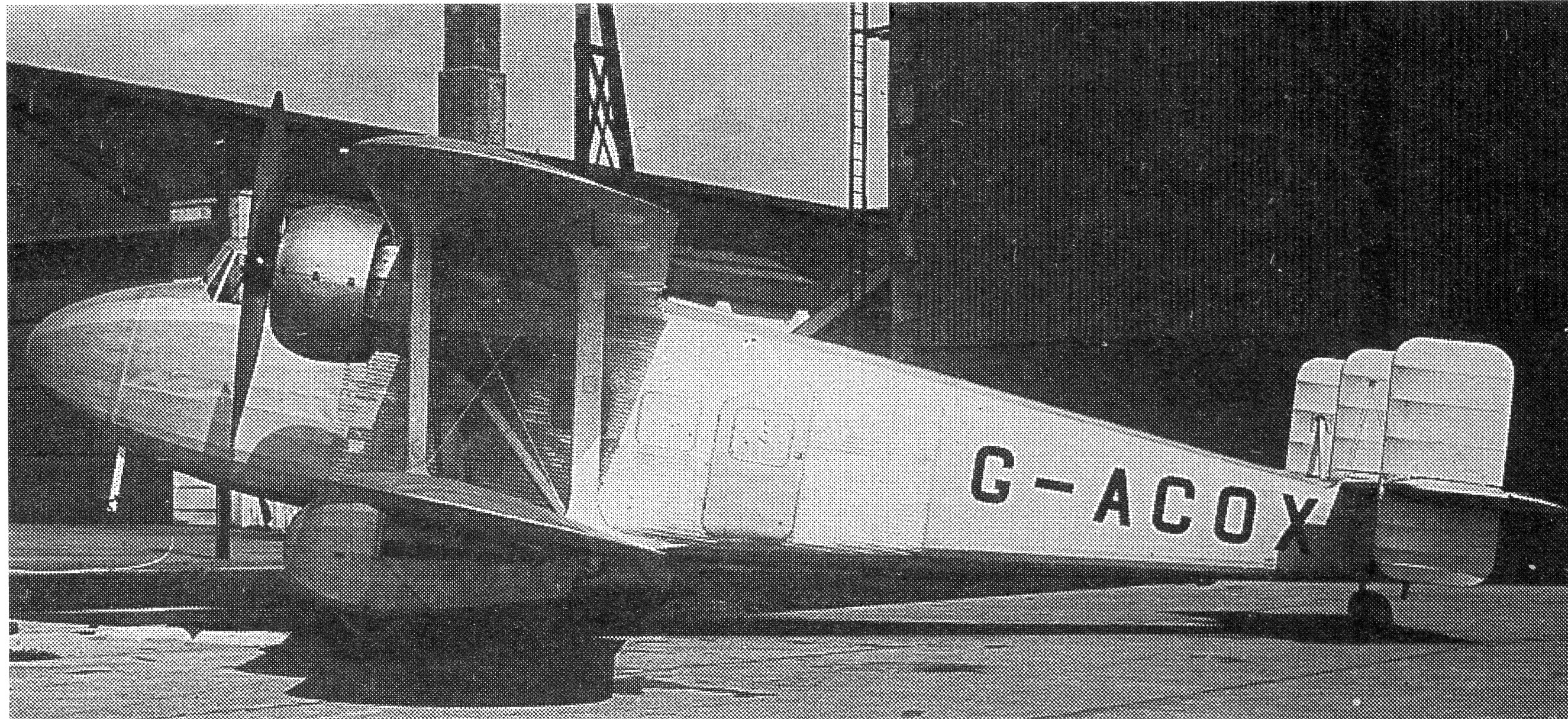
- Boulton-Paul P.71A G-ACOX Boadicea

General information
- Type: Mail plane/Light Transport
- Manufacturer: Boulton & Paul Ltd
- Primary user: Imperial Airways
- Number built: 2

History
- Introduction date: 1935
- Retired: 1936
- Developed from: Boulton Paul P.64 Mailplane

The Boulton & Paul P.71A was a 1930s British twin-engined all-metal biplane transport aircraft by Boulton & Paul Ltd used by Imperial Airways for feeder-line work. The P.71 was development of the P.64 Mailplane which had not met the airline's specifications. Two aircraft entered service in early 1935 but both were lost to accidents by end of 1936.

== History ==
The P.71A was the successor to the Boulton & Paul's first attempt to meet the airline requirement, the P.64 Mailplane. The P.71A was lighter, slimmer and longer and used Armstrong Siddeley Jaguar IVA radial piston engines.

Two aircraft were built and delivered to Imperial Airways at Croydon Airport in February 1935. The airline had lost interest in using them as mailplanes, so the two aircraft were converted as VIP transports with 13 removable seats.

=== G-ACOX ===
The first aircraft, registered G-ACOX and named Boadicea after the Briton queen of that name, was lost in the English Channel on 25 September 1936 while on an air-mail flight from Croydon to Paris with the loss of the two crew.

=== G-ACOY ===
The second aircraft, registered G-ACOY and named Britomart after the literary character of that name, was damaged beyond repair in a landing accident at Haren, Brussels on 25 October 1935.

== Operators ==
United Kingdom

- Imperial Airways

== Specifications ==
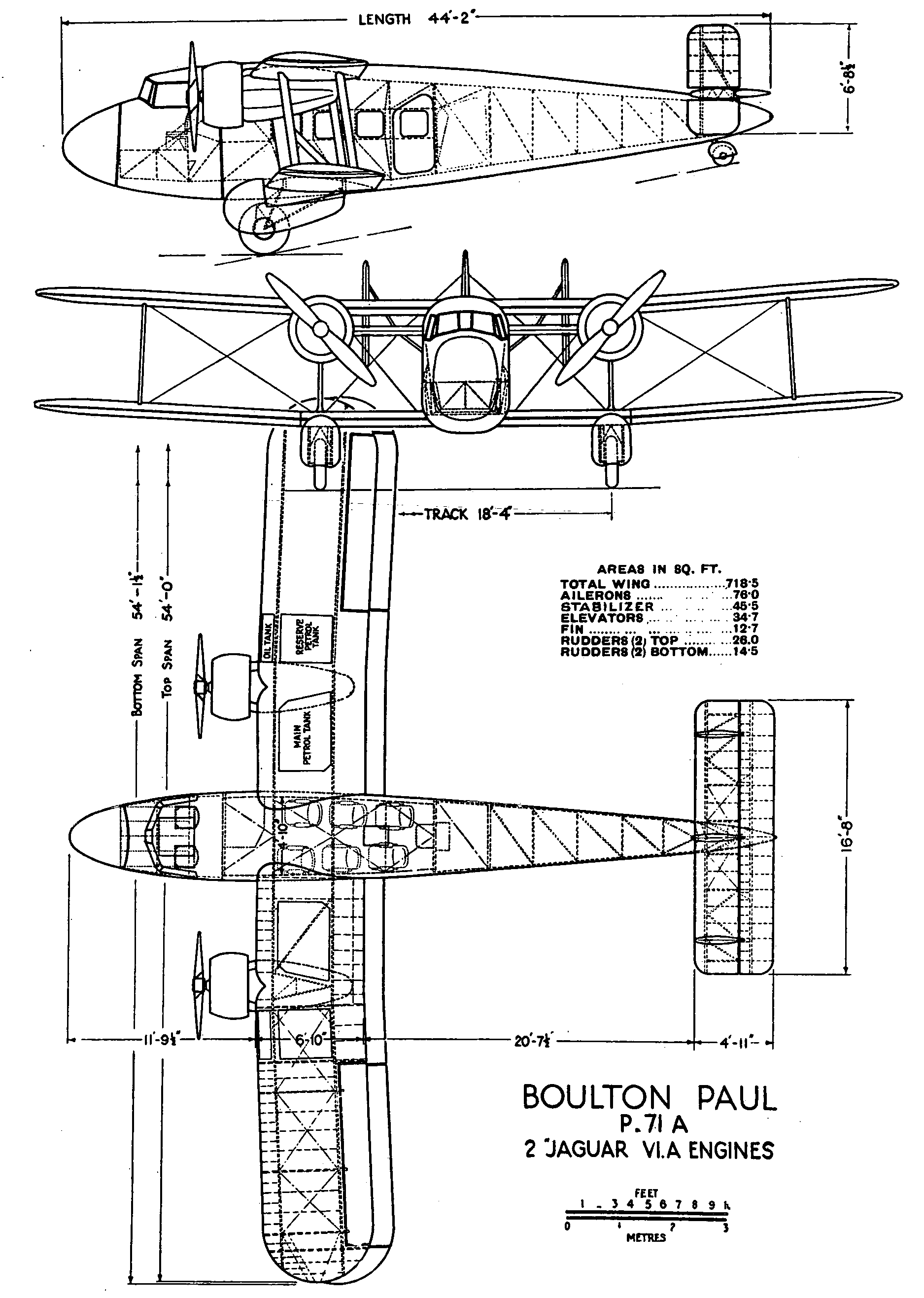
Boulton Paul P.71A 3-view drawing from NACA-AC-199

Data from Imperial Airway's Latest

General characteristics

- Crew: 2
- Capacity: 6–7 passengers
- Length: 44 ft 2 in (13.46 m)
- Wingspan: 54 ft 0 in (16.46 m)
- Height: 15 ft 2 1/4 in (4.629 m)
- Wing area: 718.5 sq ft (66.75 m^{2})
- Aspect ratio: 7.91:1
- Empty weight: 6,100 lb (2,767 kg)
- Gross weight: 9,500 lb (4,309 kg)
- Fuel capacity: 186 imp gal (223 US gal; 850 L)
- Powerplant: 2 × Armstrong Siddeley Jaguar VIA 14-cylinder radial engines, 490 hp (370 kW) each

Performance

- Maximum speed: 195 mph (314 km/h, 169 kn)
- Cruise speed: 150 mph (240 km/h, 130 kn) at 4,500 ft (1,400 m)
- Range: 600 mi (970 km, 520 nmi) (full tanks)
- Service ceiling: 21,000 ft (6,400 m)
- Rate of climb: 1,400 ft/min (7.1 m/s)
- Time to altitude: 4.5 min to 4,500 ft (1,400 m)

== See also ==
Related development

- Boulton Paul P.64 Mailplane
