= Armstrong Whitworth A.W.29 =

A.W.29

General information
- Type: Day bomber
- National origin: England
- Manufacturer: Armstrong Whitworth Aircraft
- Number built: 1 prototype

History
- First flight: 6 December 1936

The Armstrong Whitworth A.W.29 was a British bomber aircraft built by Armstrong Whitworth Aircraft.

== Design and development ==
It was built to satisfy Air Ministry specification P. 27/32, which was for a single-engined long-range day bomber. The A.W.29 was a mid-wing cantilever monoplane. Its front fuselage was a welded tubular steel structure, and the rear fuselage a monocoque light alloy with an unbraced tailplane, fin and rudder. The conventional landing gear was hydraulically retractable by either an engine-driven or hand pump leaving the tyres partially exposed. The long-chord cowled, nose-mounted engine drove a three-bladed propeller.

The A.W.29 was a two-crew aircraft. The pilot was seated ahead of the wing leading edge and the gunner/observer in a distant cockpit aft of the spar enclosed in a hand-operated turret. The aft cockpit could be fitted with a second set of controls for flight training.

Not long after the A.W.29's first flight on 6 December 1936, it was damaged in a wheels up landing. Since the Fairey Battle had been awarded the P27/32 contract, the A.W.29 was not repaired to fly again.

== Specifications ==
Data from Air Pictorial Oct. 1958

General characteristics

- Crew: 2
- Length: 43 ft 10 in (13.36 m)
- Wingspan: 49 ft 10 in (15.19 m)
- Height: 13 ft 3 in (4.04 m)
- Wing area: 412 sq ft (38.3 m^{2})
- Empty weight: 9,000 lb (4,082 kg)
- Powerplant: 1 × Armstrong Siddeley Tiger VIII , 870 hp (650 kW) at 2,450 rpm
- Propellers: 3-bladed Hamilton metal two-pitch propeller

Performance

- Maximum speed: 225 mph (362 km/h, 196 kn) at 14,700 ft (4,500 m)
- Cruise speed: 208 mph (335 km/h, 181 kn) at 14,700 ft (4,500 m)
- Range: 1,200 mi (1,900 km, 1,000 nmi)
- Ferry range: 1,200 mi (1,900 km, 1,000 nmi)
- Service ceiling: 21,000 ft (6,400 m)
- Rate of climb: 1,100 ft/min (5.6 m/s) at sea level

Armament

- Guns:
  - 1× 0.303 in (7.7 mm) Lewis Gun in an Armstrong manual turret
  - 1× fixed 0.303 in (7.7 mm) Vickers machine gun mounted in the wing
- Bombs:
  - 2 × 500 lb (230 kg) or
  - 4 × 250 lb (110 kg) or
  - 4 × 100 lb (45 kg) or
  - 4 × 112 lb (51 kg) or
  - 4 × 100 lb (45 kg) or
  - 4 × 120 lb (54 kg)
