= Bristol Type 118 =

General-purpose military aircraft

Type 118 & 120
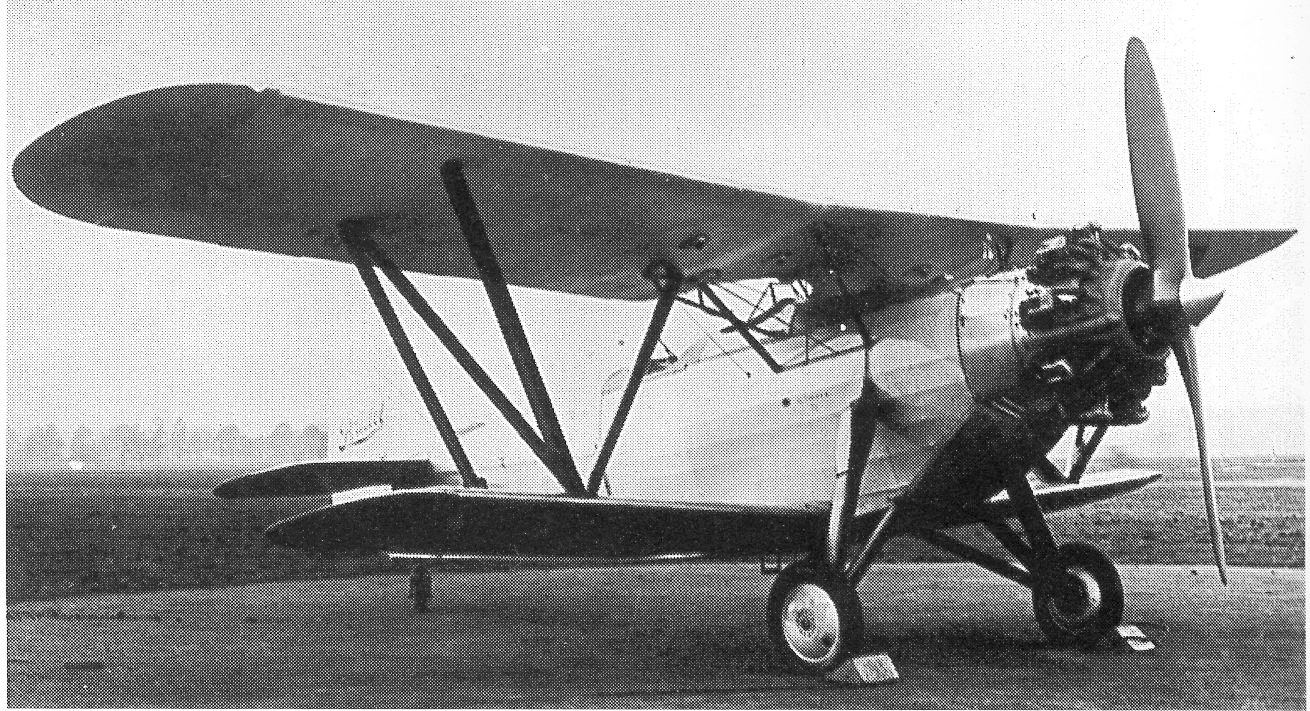
- Bristol 118

General information
- Type: Military general-purpose
- National origin: United Kingdom
- Manufacturer: Bristol Aeroplane Company
- Designer: Frank Barnwell
- Number built: 2

History
- First flight: 22 January 1931 (118); 29 January 1932 (120)

The Bristol Type 118 was a general-purpose military aircraft, a two-seat biplane built by the Bristol Aeroplane Company in the early 1930s, powered by a Bristol Mercury radial engine and aimed at overseas markets. The Type 120 was a Bristol Pegasus-engined variant entered into an Air Ministry competition and later used for armament tests. Two aircraft were built.

== Development ==
The Type 118 was a Bristol private venture, designed to provide a multi-role machine capable of acting as a fighter, bomber, reconnaissance or casualty-extraction aircraft for foreign air forces unable to afford a range of more specialised aircraft. The variety of roles required a two-seater and the need for high-altitude performance for the photo-reconnaissance role, for example, called for supercharging. Since the Bristol Jupiter radial engine design was ageing, the newer Bristol Mercury seemed a natural choice of powerplant. The first prototype was to have a supercharged Bristol Jupiter XFA engine, with the Mercury V installed in the second machine which was labelled the Type 118A.

Frank Barnwell designed a clean single-bay biplane with staggered and unequal-span wings. Wire bracing was used only in the centre section; outboard of that was a single streamlined compression strut and a three-strut drag brace on each wing. Frise-type ailerons were fitted only to the upper wings. The fuselage was of fabric-covered metal construction, similar in detail to that of the Bulldog. Rudder and elevators were horn balanced and the tailplane was of cantilever, unbraced form. The undercarriage was divided and attached to the fuselage with streamlined legs and struts. The Jaguar installation left the cylinder heads exposed, but later engines were cowled with a Townend ring.

The pilot's cockpit was high and positioned below a cutout in the trailing edge of the upper wing. He had a synchronised .303 in (7.7 mm) Vickers machine gun mounted in a trough on the port side. The observer's cockpit was behind the pilot, where he could be rear gunner, bomb aimer, photographer or radio operator. For the rear gunner's task there was a .303 in (7.7 mm) Lewis Gun mounted on a Scarff ring. For bombing and photography, he could reach a prone position with a downward view through windows in the floor. Alternatively this space could hold one person on a stretcher and a second could be carried under the removable rear fuselage decking. Bombs could be carried on external racks.

The Jaguar-engined first prototype, registered as G-ABEZ flew on 22 January 1931, piloted by Cyril Uwins. It flew under the experimental registration R-3 during 1931 and received its airworthiness certificate that December. A planned Baltic sales tour was disrupted by disputes over engine-manufacturing licensing rights. In the meantime Air Ministry interest in the Type 118 had increased and they hired "R-3", now powered by a Mercury V, fitted with a four-blade propeller and stripped of armament for endurance and desert trials (in Iraq) of that engine from February 1932. During this time, the Type 118 wore RAF markings with the serial number K2873. After these trials, this aircraft returned to Filton and was stored until April 1935 when it was used as a testbed for the engine that became the two-speed supercharged Bristol Pegasus XVII.

The second prototype, originally the Type 118A made its first flight, with the Mercury V engine that it was designed for and bearing the experimental marking R-6, on 29 January 1932 . By that time, though it had acquired a rotatable turret or cupola over the gunner's cockpit and a new type number, 120. The Mercury was a stopgap engine (though the Mercury V had been recently renamed the Pegasus) and a Pegasus I.M.3 replaced it that April. The cupola was a lightweight transparent structure that completely enclosed the gunner and rotated with his Lewis gun, its Scarff ring now mounted higher in the cockpit. It gave him protection from the slipstream, which was particularly helpful when he was standing to fire downwards.

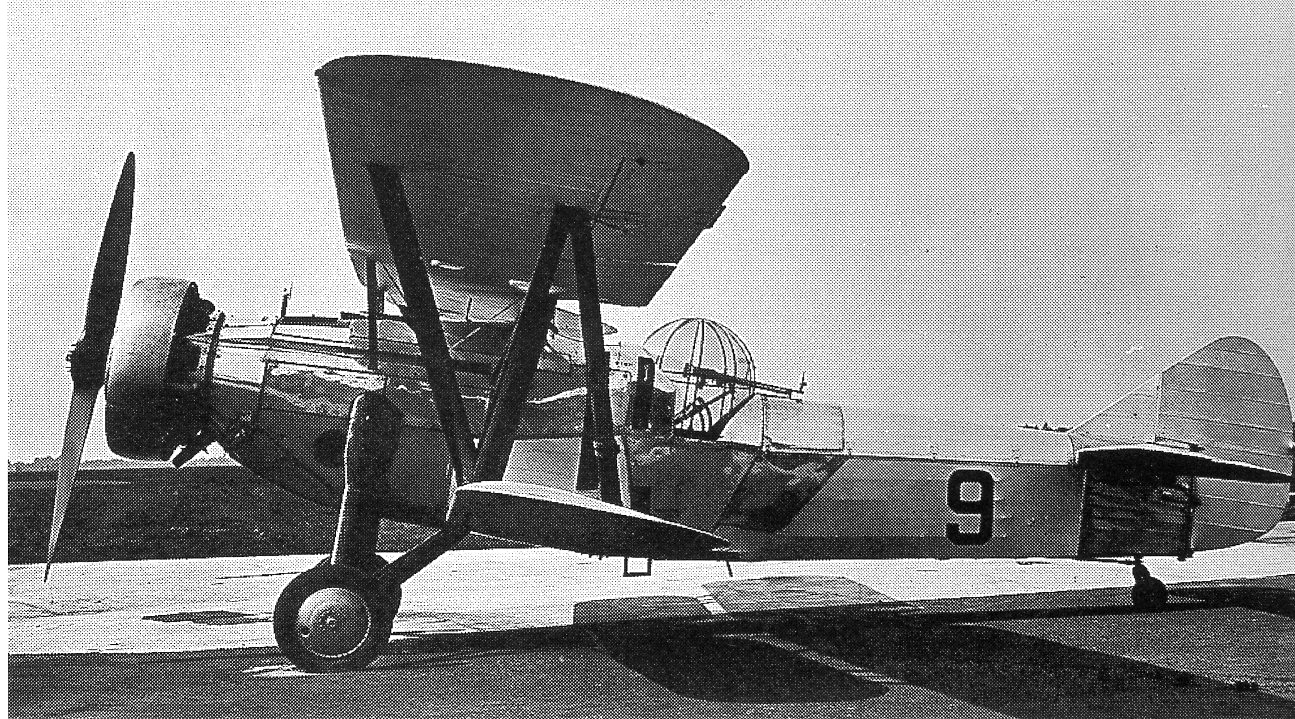
Bristol 120

In April the Type 120 went to Martlesham as a competitor for the Air Ministry specification G.4/31 to replace the ageing Westland Wapiti and Fairey Gordon but was not successful, chiefly because the Air Ministry had added torpedo bombing to the tasks required of the general-purpose aircraft. Despite this the Type 120 was bought by the Air Ministry and used to investigate the drag of the turret by flying with and without it. During this time, it was in RAF markings with the serial K3587. Continuing disputes over engine manufacturing licensing meant that Spanish interest in the Type 120 came to nothing.

== Specifications (Type 120) ==
Data from Barnes 1970, p. 242

General characteristics

- Crew: two
- Length: 34 ft 0 in (10.36 m)
- Wingspan: 40 ft 8 in (12.40 m)
- Height: 12 ft 0 in (3.66 m)
- Wing area: 376 sq ft (34.9 m^{2})
- Empty weight: 3,632 lb (1,647 kg)
- Gross weight: 5,200 lb (2,359 kg)
- Powerplant: 1 × Bristol Pegasus I.M.3 9-cylinder single row air cooled radial , 650 hp (485 kW)

Performance

- Maximum speed: 175 mph (282 km/h, 152 kn)
- Service ceiling: 25,600 ft (7,805 m)

Armament

- 1 × 0.303 in (7.7 mm) Vickers machine gun firing through propeller from port side trough
- 1 × 0.303 in (7.7 mm) Lewis gun on Scarff ring under rotatable turret
- bomb loads of up to total of 500 lb (227 kg) in external racks
