= Parnall G.4/31 =

G.4/31
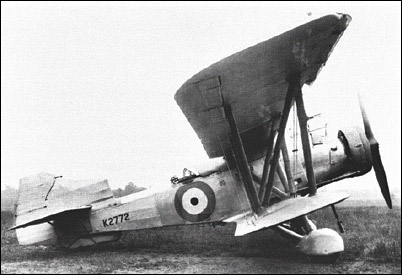
- Parnall G.4/31 in its modified, final form with greatly enlarged tail fin

General information
- Type: Bomber/reconnaissance/torpedo bomber
- National origin: UK
- Manufacturer: Parnall
- Primary user: Aeroplane and Armament Experimental Establishment
- Number built: 1

History
- First flight: 1935

The Parnall G.4/31 was a 1930s design from the George Parnall and Company to meet Air Ministry Specification G.4/31 for a "general purpose" aircraft.

== Design and development ==
The Parnall G.4/31 design would be as a replacement for the Westland Wapiti and Fairey Gordon. As such it needed to be usable as a day and night bomber as well as the reconnaissance, torpedo and dive-bombing roles. Designs were offered by Handley Page, Vickers, Fairey and Armstrong Whitworth as well as Parnall.

The G.4/31 was a large angular biplane with fixed spatted wheel spats powered by a 690 hp (515 kW) Bristol Pegasus IM3 with a Townend ring. There was a single forward-firing machine gun for the pilot and a Scarff ring mounted Lewis gun for the observer. Underwing bomb racks on the lower wings and provision to carry a torpedo between the main undercarriage units was also envisioned.

After the prototype was rolled out in 1935, a number of changes were made to the airframe and tail surfaces, when results from wind tunnel testing by the Royal Aeronautical Establishment (R.A.E.) with models revealed problems in spinning. Modifications to the fin, rudder, elevators and rear fuselage were necessary.

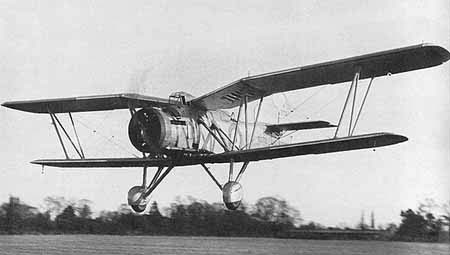
Parnall G.4/31 tested at Martlesham Heath, c. 1936

== Testing ==
First flying at the Parnall factory in Yate, Bristol, in 1935 with Captain Howard John Saint at the controls, it was not delivered for evaluation by the Aeroplane and Armament Experimental Establishment (A&AEE) at Martlesham Heath until early 1936. The biplane Vickers Type 253 had already been selected to meet the specification and then cancelled when the Ministry saw that Vickers monoplane alternative to the Type 253 was superior and that entered service as the Vickers Wellesley.

The sole Parnall G.4/31 (serial K2772) prototype was used for armament trials by the A&AED until March 1937 when it was damaged in a crash and subsequently scrapped. The G.4/31 was the final military design from the company.

== Operators ==
United Kingdom

- Aeroplane and Armament Experimental Establishment
- Bristol Aeroplane Company

== Specifications (G.4/31) ==
Data from The British Bomber since 1914

General characteristics

- Crew: 2
- Length: 35 ft 9 in (10.90 m)
- Wingspan: 57 ft (17 m)
- Height: 15 ft (4.6 m)
- Wing area: 687 sq ft (63.8 m^{2})
- Gross weight: 6,800 lb (3,084 kg)
- Powerplant: 1 × Bristol Pegasus IM3 9-cylinder air-cooled radial piston engine, 690 hp (510 kW) for take-off

630 hp (470 kW) normal rating

- Propellers: 2-bladed fixed-pitch propeller

Performance

- Maximum speed: 165 mph (266 km/h, 143 kn) at 5,000 ft (1,500 m) (approx.)

Armament

- Guns: 2× 0.303 in (7.7 mm) machine guns
- Bombs: 1,500 lb (680 kg) of bombs or an 18 inch Mk VIII torpedo

== See also ==
- Fairey G.4/31
- Handley Page H.P.47
