= Handley Page H.P.47 =

British single-engined low-wing monoplane

H.P.47
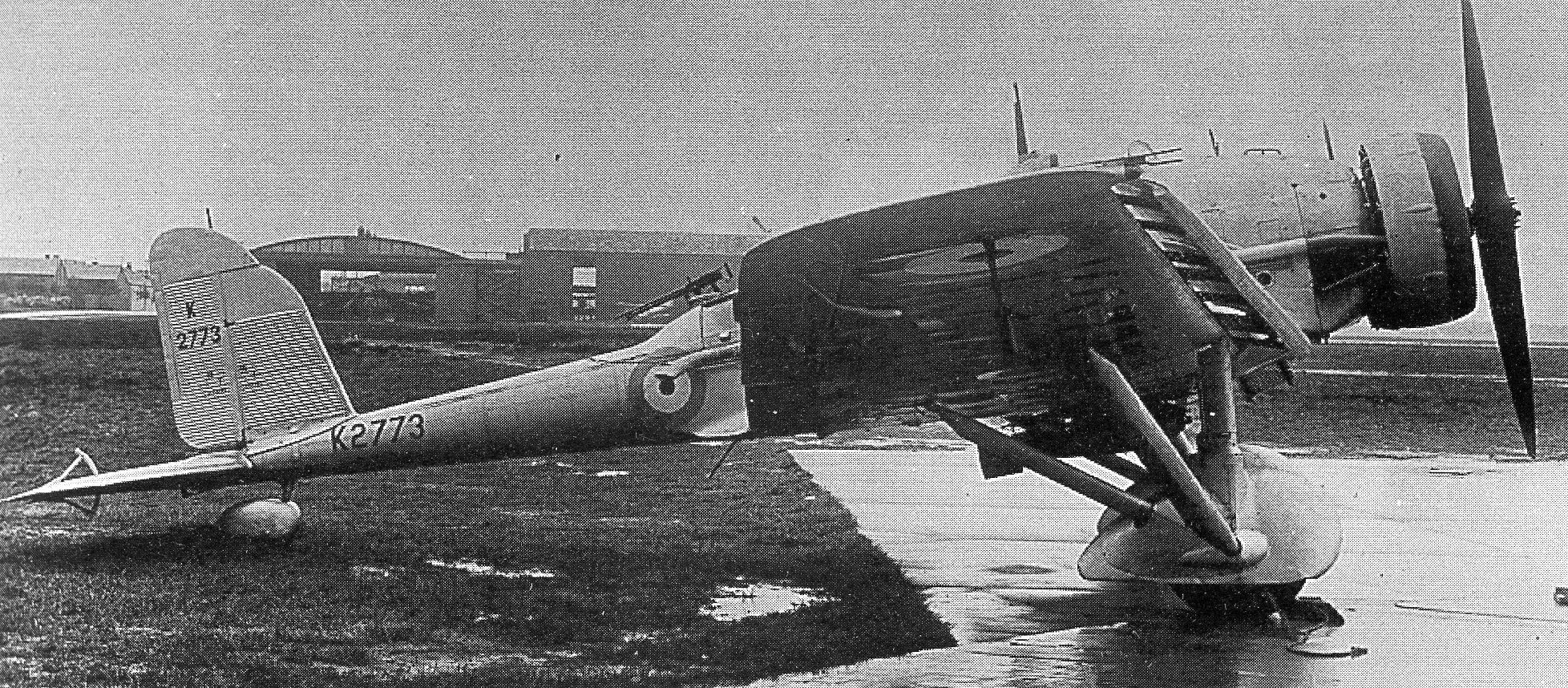

General information
- Type: Bomber/torpedo bomber
- National origin: United Kingdom
- Manufacturer: Handley Page
- Designer: Gustav Lachmann
- Number built: 1

History
- First flight: 27 November 1934
- Retired: May 1937

The Handley Page H.P.47 was a British single-engined low-wing monoplane built to an Air Ministry specification for a general-purpose bomber and torpedo bomber aircraft. Only one was built.

== Development ==
The Handley Page H.P.47 was the company's submission to Air Ministry specification G.4/31 which called for a single-engined general-purpose aircraft to replace the Vickers Vincent in its Imperial role, to act as a bomber flying from unprepared airstrips and to be a torpedo bomber in the Tropics, particularly Aden. Handley Page were awarded a contract for one prototype; its designer, Gustav Lachmann had monitored German monoplane progress on behalf of Handley Page, so it was not surprising that the H.P.47 used construction methods similar to those of companies like Junkers. He had also become interested in the use of thick wing sections such as RAF34 for which the centre of pressure moved little with angle of attack, making the design of a single-spar monoplane wing easier.

The H.P47 was a low-wing cantilever monoplane. Forward of the single spar the wing was covered with a stressed metal skin, forming a torsion box. Behind the spar it was fabric-covered, the trailing edge carrying flaps inboard, from the wing fillet out to the ailerons, though the centre section was metal-skinned throughout. The leading edge carried slats in three sections to form slots across the whole span when extended. The inboard pair were opened when the flaps were lowered and the outer slots were automatic, with interceptors connected to the ailerons for lateral control at high angles of attack. Behind the radial Bristol Pegasus IM3 engine, producing 650 hp (485 kW) and enclosed in a Townend ring, the semi-monocoque, corrugated-skinned fuselage grew in diameter to the pilot's midwing cockpit then remaining constant rearwards to the gunner's position. He sat facing rearwards below the upper fuselage line and out of the slipstream, at a point where the fuselage stepped to a slim and narrowing oval boom. There was usable space inside the fuselage between the cockpits, enough to carry three passengers or two stretcher cases. All the tail surfaces moved; the fin, mounted ahead of the tailplane, moved with the horn-balanced rudder but through smaller angles, changing the camber, and the tailplane and single elevator were similarly coupled. All these rear control surfaces were covered with corrugated stressed skin. Specification G.4/31 included the dropping of torpedoes, so the underside of the aircraft had to be clear and with wing fuel tanks the main undercarriage was fixed. The legs were mounted at the end of the centre section, each with a rearward strut and a long bracing strut outwards to the main spar. These struts were faired and both main and tail wheels were spatted. The main wheels were fitted with brakes.

The first flight, without Townend ring, spats or undercarriage fairings, was on 27 November 1934. Several modifications followed, including the abandonment of the forward-sliding front cockpit hood, extension of the rudder and mass-balancing of the elevators. Trials with full military load and with the Pegasus IM3 replaced by a more powerful IIIM3 followed at RAF Martlesham Heath in the G.4/31 trials. The main criticism was of the lack of longitudinal stability and the consequent trimming difficulty. The competition winner was the Vickers Type 246, put into production as the Vickers Wellesley. The H.P.47 continued to fly at the Royal Aircraft Establishment (RAE), testing its combination of slots, interceptors and flaps at low speeds; it was used for engine development, flying until May 1937.

== Specifications (General-purpose configuration) ==
Data from Handley Page Aircraft since 1907

General characteristics

- Crew: 2
- Length: 37 ft 7.5 in (11.468 m)
- Wingspan: 58 ft (18 m)
- Wing area: 438 sq ft (40.7 m^{2})
- Empty weight: 5,362 lb (2,432 kg)
- Gross weight: 7,708 lb (3,496 kg)
- Powerplant: 1 × Bristol Pegasus IIIM 9-cylinder air-cooled radial piston engine, 690 hp (510 kW)
- Propellers: 2-bladed wooden fixed-pitch propeller

Performance

- Maximum speed: 161 mph (259 km/h, 140 kn)
- Range: 1,250 mi (2,010 km, 1,090 nmi)
- Service ceiling: 19,900 ft (6,100 m)

Armament

- Guns: 1 × 0.303 in (7.70 mm) Vickers machine gun fixed forward firing and 1× 0.303 in Lewis machine gun on high speed mounting in rear cockpit

== See also ==
Aircraft of comparable role, configuration, and era

- Fairey G.4/31
- Parnall G.4/31
