= Blackburn B-7 =

B-7
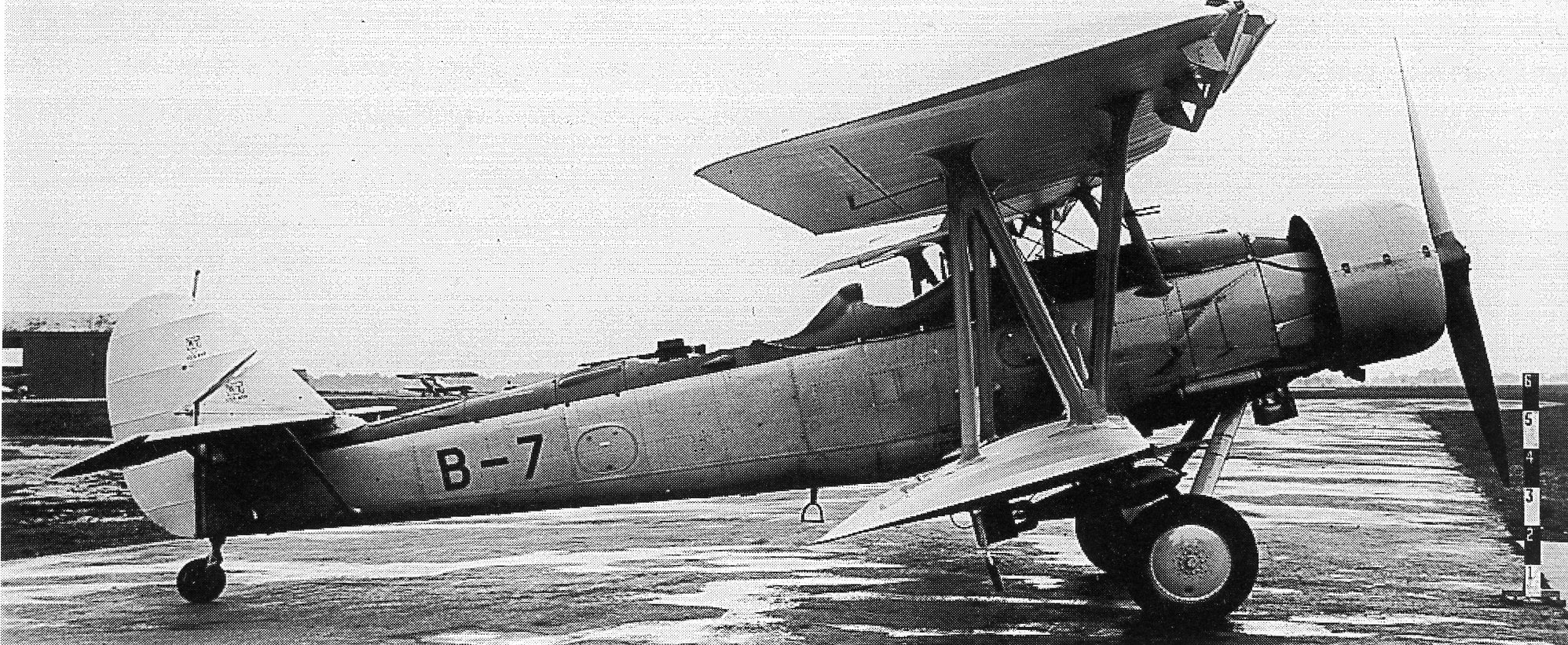

General information
- Type: general purpose military
- National origin: United Kingdom
- Manufacturer: Blackburn Aeroplane and Motor Co. Ltd
- Number built: 1

History
- First flight: 28 November 1934
- Developed from: Blackburn Shark

The Blackburn B-7 was a single-engine two/three-seat biplane built to a British Air Ministry specification for a general-purpose, multitasking aircraft. It first flew in 1934, but no contracts were issued and only one aircraft was completed.

== Development ==
Air Ministry specification G.4/31 called for an aircraft to replace the Westland Wapiti and Fairey Gordon. The task list was long: day and night light bombing, dive bombing, reconnaissance and army cooperation. The specification attracted interest across the British aircraft industry and eight manufacturers were immediately involved in preparing prototypes, three receiving contracts and the others going forward as private ventures. Blackburn became involved only when the Air Ministry extended the role list to include coastal defence and torpedo bombing, Blackburn's speciality.

Their contender became known as the B-7 after the Class B marking it carried and lacking an old-style Blackburn-type number. It was built on the Shark production line and had much in common with it. The Shark had introduced a new wing construction to Blackburn, each wing having two outward slanting (at about 45°, rather than vertical), slightly distorted N-type struts linked by a single strut from the lower front to upper rear spars. As a result of this Warren girder structure, few bracing wires compared to past practice were needed. The wings were slightly staggered and swept and had the same span and much smaller lower wing as the Shark. Unlike the Shark the wings did not fold; another significant difference was that wing area was increased to enhance the load carrying performance by increasing the chord. The B-7 shared with the Shark the semi-monocoque aluminium-clad watertight fuselage first seen on the M.1/30A and the divided main undercarriage necessitated by the torpedo-dropping role.

Accommodation, equipment and armament was similar to that of the Shark. They also shared the 700 hp (520 kW) Armstrong Siddeley Tiger IV engine. The B-7 first flew on 28 November 1934.

== Operational history ==
The B-7 was flown to Martlesham Heath for competitive trials in May 1935 and completed in October that year. By now, the specification was four years old, requirements had changed and there was little official interest in the results and none of the nine manufacturers was awarded a contract. Shortly afterwards, the B-7 was scrapped.

== Specifications (bomber) ==
Data from Jackson 1968, pp. 387–8

General characteristics

- Crew: two/three
- Length: 35 ft 4.33 in (12.08 m)
- Wingspan: 46 ft 0 in (14.02 m)
- Height: 12 ft 9 in (3.89 m)
- Gross weight: 7,027 lb (3,187 kg)
- Powerplant: 1 × Armstrong Siddeley Tiger IV 14-cylinder double-row radial , 700 hp (520 kW)

Performance

- Maximum speed: 160 mph (257 km/h, 140 kn) at 6,000 ft (1,830 m)
- Cruise speed: 100 mph (160 km/h, 87 kn)
- Range: 540 mi (870 km, 470 nmi)
- Service ceiling: 20,000 ft (6,100 m)
- Rate of climb: 1,200 ft/min (6.1 m/s)

Armament

- 1 × forward firing 0.303 in (7.7 mm) Vickers machine gun
- 1 × ring mounted 0.303 in (7.7 mm) Lewis Gun
