= Bristol Pegasus =

Radial aero engine

Pegasus
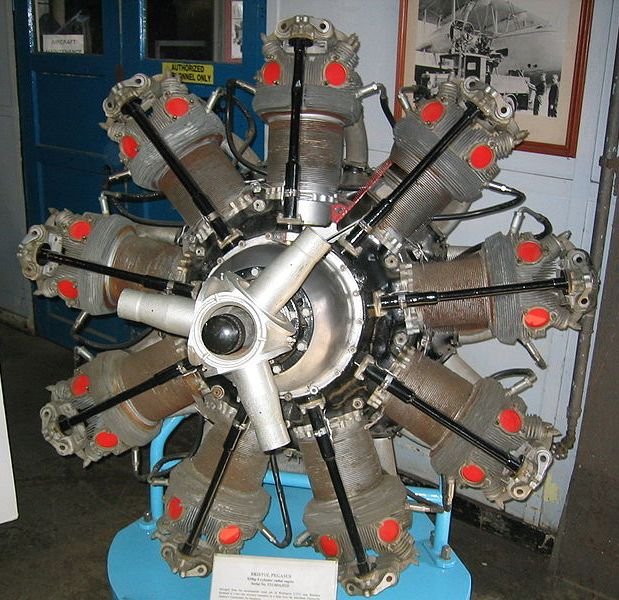
- Preserved Bristol Pegasus on display at the Brooklands Museum. The red circles are temporary blanking plates removed when the exhaust manifold is fitted
- Type: Piston aero engine
- Manufacturer: Bristol Aeroplane Company
- First run: c.1932
- Major applications: Fairey Swordfish; Short Sunderland; Vickers Wellington; Handley Page Hampden
- Number built: c.32,000
- Developed from: Bristol Jupiter
- Developed into: Bristol Draco; Bristol Phoenix

The Bristol Pegasus is a British nine-cylinder, single-row, air-cooled radial aero engine. Designed by Roy Fedden of the Bristol Aeroplane Company, it was used to power both civil and military aircraft of the 1930s and 1940s. Developed from the earlier Mercury and Jupiter engines, later variants could produce 1,000 horsepower (750 kilowatts) from its capacity of 1,750 cubic inches (28 L) by use of a geared supercharger.

Further developments of the Pegasus created the fuel-injected Bristol Draco and the diesel Bristol Phoenix, both types being produced in limited numbers. In contrast, by the end of production over 30,000 Pegasus engines had been built. Aircraft applications ranged from single-engine biplanes to the four-engined Short Sandringham and Sunderland flying boats. Several altitude and distance records were set by aircraft using the Pegasus.

The Bristol Siddeley company reused the name many years later for the turbofan engine used in the Hawker Siddeley Harrier and which became known as the Rolls-Royce Pegasus when Rolls-Royce took over that company. Two Bristol Pegasus engines remain airworthy in 2010, powering Fairey Swordfish aircraft operated by the Royal Navy Historic Flight (became Navy Wings in March 2019); other examples are preserved and on public display in aviation museums.

== Design and development ==
The Pegasus was designed by Sir Roy Fedden as the follow-on to the Bristol Aeroplane Company's very successful Bristol Jupiter, using lessons learned in development of the Mercury. Although having a capacity (25 L) almost 15% smaller, the Mercury produced about as much power as the Jupiter, through a combination of supercharging to improve the "charge", and various changes to increase the operating RPM. The power of a piston engine can be calculated by multiplying the charge per cylinder by the number of cycles per second; the Mercury improved both and thereby produced more power for a given size. The primary advantage was a much improved power-to-weight ratio due to better volumetric efficiency.

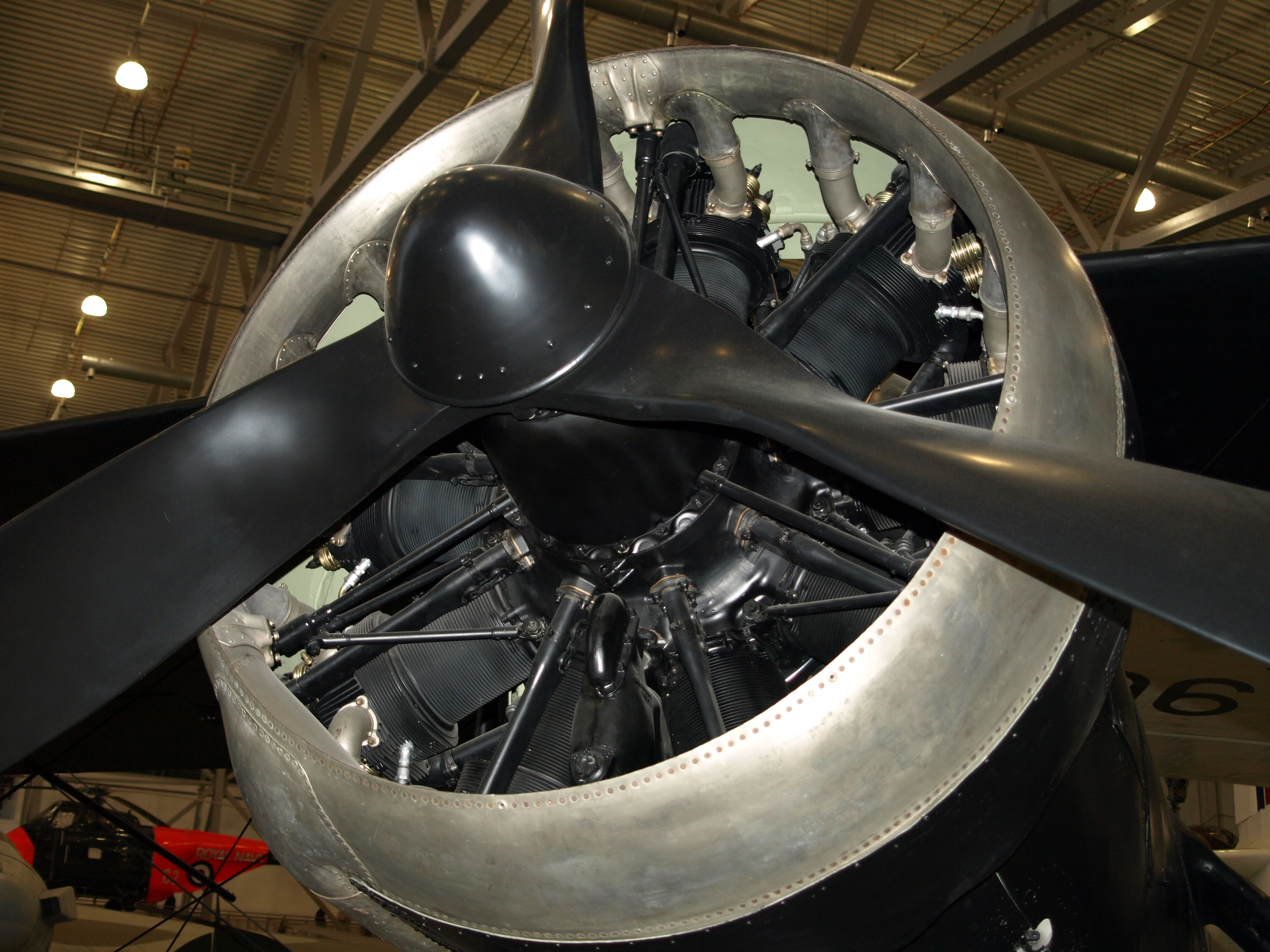
Bristol Pegasus fitted to a Fairey Swordfish

The Pegasus was the same size, displacement and general steel/aluminium construction as the Jupiter, but various improvements allowed the maximum engine speed to be increased from 1,950 to 2,600 rpm for take-off power. This improved performance considerably from the Jupiter's 580 hp (430 kW), to the first Pegasus II with 635 hp (474 kW), to 690 hp (510 kW) in the first production model Pegasus III, and eventually to the late-model Pegasus XXII with 1,010 hp (750 kW) thanks to the two-speed supercharger (introduced on the Pegasus XVIII) and 100-octane fuel. This gave rise to the claim "one pound per horsepower" reflecting the excellent power-to-weight ratio.

Some notable users of the Pegasus were the Fairey Swordfish, Vickers Wellington, and Short Sunderland. It was also used on the Anbo 41, Bristol Bombay, Saro London, Short Empire, Vickers Wellesley and the Westland Wallace. Like the Jupiter before it, the Pegasus was also licensed by the PZL company in Poland. It was used on the PZL.23 Karaś and PZL.37 Łoś bombers.

In Italy Alfa Romeo Avio built both the Jupiter (126-RC35) and the Pegasus under licence, with the engine based on the Pegasus designated as the Alfa Romeo 126-RC34 with the civil version as the 126-RC10. In Czechoslovakia it was built by Walter Engines and was known as the Pegas.

Approximately 32,000 Pegasus engines were built. The Pegasus set three height records in the Bristol Type 138: in 1932, 1936 and 1937. It was used for the first flight over Mount Everest in the Westland Wallace, and in 1938 set the world's long-distance record in Vickers Wellesleys.

In service the Pegasus was generally reliable with the exception that the valves were prone to failure. The valves were operated by rocker-boxes, which were lubricated by oil pads on the top of the cylinder heads. In hot climates the lubrication deteriorated which could lead to seizing of the valves. Also if a problem developed with the engine and the pilot shut it down it was not possible to "feather" the propeller and so it would continue to rotate creating drag and continue to turn the engine which had no lubrication being forced through it by the oil pump.

== Variants ==
The Pegasus was produced in many variants, early prototype engines were unsupercharged but the majority used a geared supercharger, either single-speed or two-speed. Variant differences included compression ratios, propeller reduction gear ratios and accessories.

== Applications ==
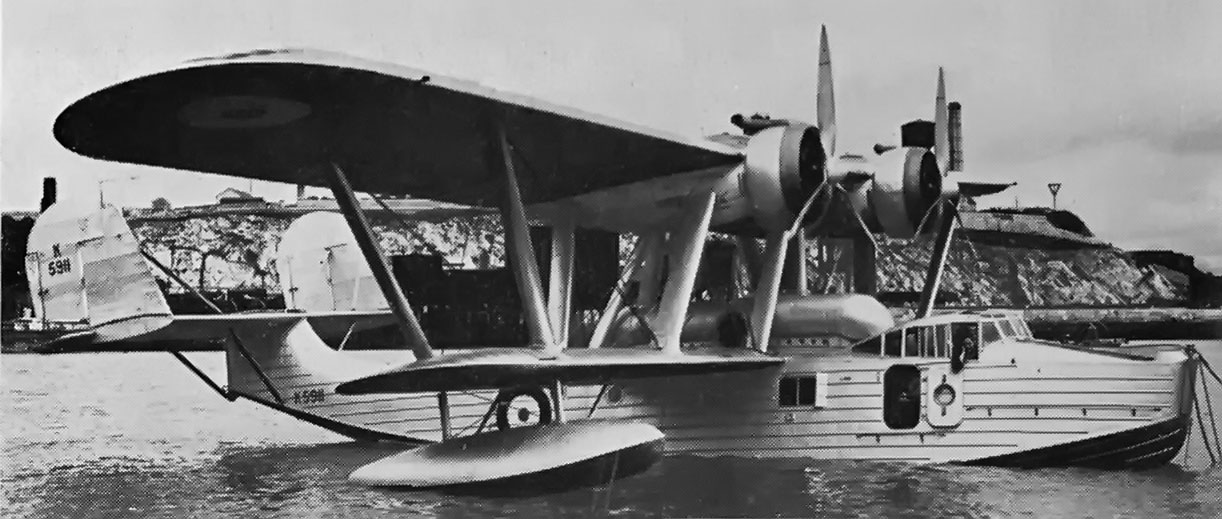
Saro London

Note:

- ANBO IV
- ANBO VIII
- Blackburn Baffin
- Blackburn Ripon
- Blackburn Shark
- Boulton Paul Mailplane
- Boulton Paul Overstrand
- Boulton Paul Sidestrand
- Bristol Bombay
- Bristol Type 118
- Bristol Type 120
- Bristol Type 138
- Douglas DC-2
- Fairey TSR I
- Fairey Seal
- Fairey Swordfish
- Fokker C.X
- Fokker D.XXI-5
- Fokker T.V
- Gloster Goring
- Handley Page H.P.43
- Handley Page H.P.47
- Handley Page H.P.51
- Handley Page Hampden
- Handley Page H.P.54 Harrow
- Hawker Audax
- Hawker Hart
- Hawker Osprey
- Junkers Ju 52
- Junkers Ju 86K-4
- Koolhoven FK.52
- Letov Š-328
- LWS-6 Żubr
- PZL.23 Karaś
- PZL.37 Łoś
- PZL.46 Sum
- Saro London
- Savoia-Marchetti SM.95
- Short Mayo Composite
- Short Sandringham
- Short Sunderland
- Short Empire
- Short Syrinx
- Supermarine Stranraer
- Supermarine Walrus
- Vickers Type 253
- Vickers Valentia
- Vickers Vanox
- Vickers Vellox
- Vickers Vespa
- Vickers Viastra X
- Vickers Victoria
- Vickers Vildebeest
- Vickers Vincent
- Vickers Virginia
- Vickers Wellington
- Vickers Wellesley
- Westland Wallace
- Westland Wapiti
- Westland PV.7
- Westland-Houston PV-3

== Engines on display ==
Bristol Pegasus engines can be viewed installed in aircraft at the Royal Air Force Museum London and the Imperial War Museum Duxford. An unrestored Pegasus recovered from the sea bed is in the care of the Bristol Aero Collection, which is closed while moving from Kemble Airport to Filton.

There is also an engine on display at the Brooklands Museum at Weybridge.

== Surviving engines ==
As of October 2010 two Bristol Pegasus engines remain airworthy in England. They power the two Fairey Swordfish aircraft operated by the Royal Navy Historic Flight.

== Specifications (Pegasus XVIII) ==
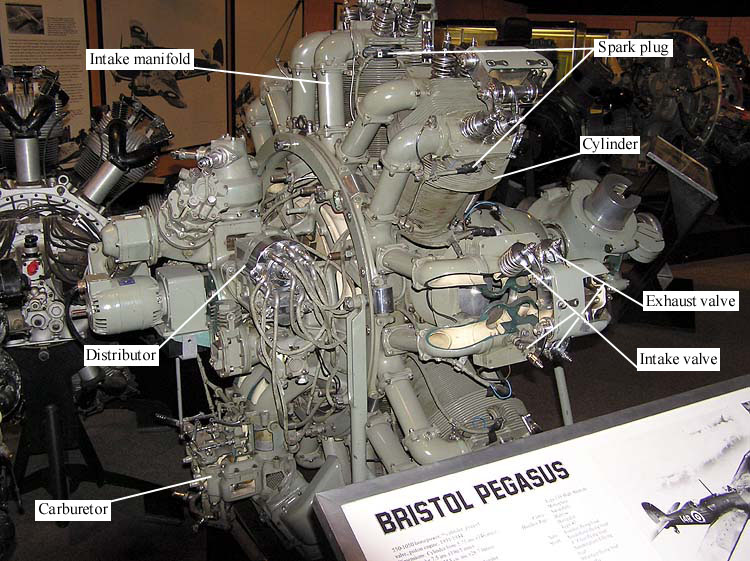
Bristol Pegasus engine with some components labelled

Data from Lumsden.

=== General characteristics ===
- Type: 9-cylinder, single-row, supercharged, air-cooled radial engine
- Bore: 5.75 in (146 mm)
- Stroke: 7.5 in (190 mm)
- Displacement: 1,753 cu in (28.7 L)
- Length: 61 in (1,500 mm)
- Diameter: 55.3 in (1,400 mm)
- Dry weight: 1,111 lb (504 kg)

=== Components ===
- Valvetrain: Four pushrod-actuated valves per cylinder – two intake and two sodium-filled exhaust
- Supercharger: Two-speed centrifugal type supercharger
- Fuel system: Claudel-Hobson AVT 95-MB carburettor
- Fuel type: 87 Octane petrol
- Oil system: Dry sump with one combination pressure/scavenge pump
- Cooling system: Air-cooled
- Reduction gear: Farman epicyclic gearing, 0.5:1
- Propeller: Rotol three-blade with variable pitch

=== Performance ===
- Power output: * 965 hp (720 kW) at 2,475 rpm for takeoff at sea level
- 835 hp (623 kW) at 2,250 rpm at 8,500 ft (2,600 m), maximum continuous climb power
- 965 hp (720 kW) at 2,600 rpm at 13,000 ft (4,000 m), maximum power (emergency combat - 5 minutes only)
- Specific power: 0.55 hp/in³ (25 kW/L)
- Compression ratio: 6.25:1
- Specific fuel consumption: 0.52 lb/(hp·h) (319 g/(kW·h))
- Oil consumption: 0.28 oz/(hp·h) (11 g/(kW·h))
- Power-to-weight ratio: 0.86 hp/lb (1.42 kW/kg)

== See also ==
Related development

- Bristol Jupiter
- Bristol Mercury
- Bristol Phoenix
- Alfa Romeo 125

Comparable engines

- Pratt & Whitney R-1690
- Wright R-1820

Related lists

- List of aircraft engines
