= Fairey G.4/31 =

British single-engined, two-seat biplane

G.4/31
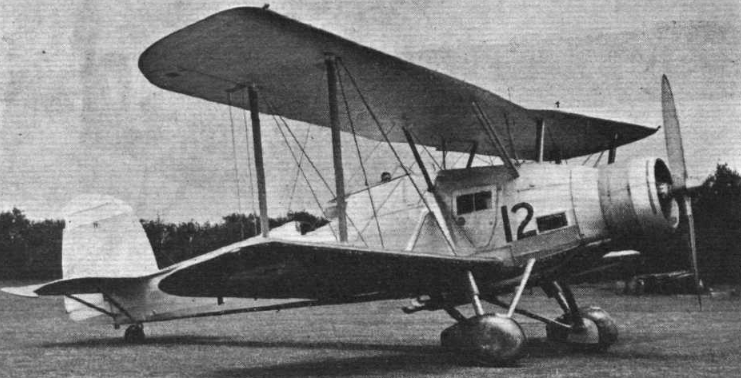

General information
- Type: Multi-role military
- National origin: United Kingdom
- Manufacturer: Fairey Aviation Company
- Number built: 1

History
- First flight: 29 March 1934

The Fairey G.4/31 was a British single-engined, two-seat biplane contender for an Air Ministry specification for a multi-role or general purpose aircraft. Unsuccessful, only one was built.

== Development ==
In the early 1930s, the Air Ministry sought economies with a specification for a multi-role replacement for the Fairey Gordon and Westland Wapiti. The winner of Air Ministry specification G.4/31 had to be capable at level bombing, army co-operation, dive bombing, reconnaissance, casualty evacuation and torpedo bombing. Since large production numbers were expected, most aircraft companies submitted prototypes, either Ministry or privately funded. Fairey's biplane submission was known only by the specification name. Initially it was a private venture, but Fairey did get a contract for a monoplane competitor which was not completed and the Ministry allowed transfer of funding.

All metal with fabric covering, the G.4/31 was a large single-engined single-bay biplane, with unswept, unequal-span wings of marked stagger. Both wings carried ailerons and the upper planes had leading edge slots; both wings were cut back to the rear spar at the centre section for visibility. A pair of struts braced the two lower wing spars to the upper fuselage, from where another pair braced the upper rear spars; a separate pair of struts linked the forward spars of the upper wings to the forward fuselage. There was a split axle undercarriage, necessary for torpedo launching, with its main legs connected to the front spar below the fuselage struts and braced for and aft to the lower fuselage. Main wheel brakes were fitted.

The fuselage initially carried a flat-topped fin and rudder, the latter with a conspicuous servo tab. The horizontal surfaces were supported by struts to the lower fuselage and there were long, narrow anti-spin strakes along to top of the fuselage in front of them. A tailwheel had a small ventral fin in front of it. The pilot's open cockpit, just behind and below the upper wing, was a little unusual in being offset to port; the lower wing cut out was also asymmetric, longer to starboard. The asymmetry allowed a narrow passageway between the observer/gunner's cockpit behind the pilot to a navigator's/bomb aimer's/ casualty cabin within the fuselage between the wings. This windowed cabin had a starboard side door for ground access. Beyond the cabin the fuselage diameter decreased to the radial engine.

The G.4/31 first flew, powered by an uncowled nine cylinder, 635 hp (474 kW) Bristol Pegasus IIM3 engine on 29 March 1934. Its early form became known as the Mk.I, but by 22 June it was flying as the cleaned-up Mk II. This differed chiefly in having a smaller diameter, double row 750 hp Armstrong Siddeley Tiger IV engine in a long chord cowling, a lengthened fuselage, a more rounded fin and rudder without the servo tab and a spatted main undercarriage without the tail wheel ventral fin.

The G.4/31 did not receive a production order and only one was built; the specification competition winner was the Vickers Type 253, but the Ministry order for 150 examples of that biplane was rapidly replaced by one for Vickers monoplane private venture contender, the Wellesley.

== Specifications (Mk. II, bomber configuration) ==
Data from Taylor 1974, pp. 230

General characteristics

- Crew: 2
- Length: 40 ft 10 in (12.44 m)
- Wingspan: 53 ft 0 in (16.15 m)
- Height: 15 ft 8 in (4.78 m)
- Wing area: 658 sq ft (61.13 m^{2})
- Empty weight: 3,169 lb (6,987 kg)
- Gross weight: 3,987 lb (8,790 kg)
- Powerplant: 1 × Armstrong Siddeley Tiger IV 14-cylinder two row radial , 750 hp (560 kW)

Performance

- Maximum speed: 157 mph (253 km/h, 136 kn) at 6,500ft (2,000 m)
- Service ceiling: 23,200 ft (7,100 m)
- Rate of climb: 694 ft/min (3.53 m/s) to 5,000 ft (1,500 m)

Armament

- 1× 0.303 in (7.7 mm) Lewis machine gun fixed in lower port wing
- 1× 0.303 in (7.7 mm) Lewis machine gun on Fairey high speed mounting in rear cockpit
- maximum 1,500 lb (680 kg) bomb load
