= Parnall Possum =

Possum
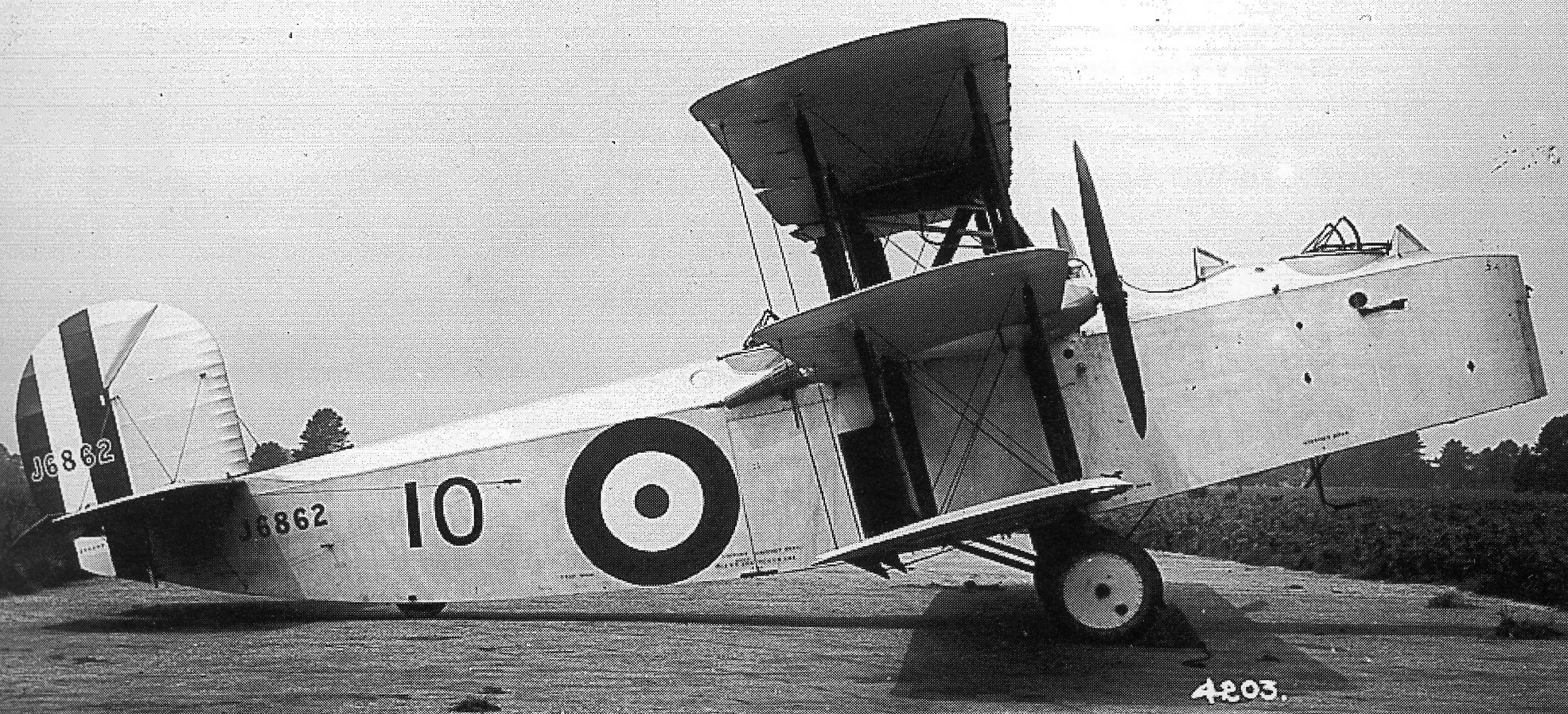

General information
- Type: Experimental bomber
- National origin: United Kingdom
- Manufacturer: George Parnall and Co.
- Designer: Harold Bolas
- Number built: 2

History
- First flight: 19 June 1923

The Parnall Possum was an experimental triplane with a single, central engine driving wing-mounted propellers via shafts and gears. Two of these British aircraft were built in the mid-1920s.

== Design and development ==
The Parnall Possum was one of few large aircraft having its engine in its fuselage and the propellers on its wings. The concept arose immediately after World War I, when the British & Colonial Aeroplane Co. (later Bristol), began thinking about large transport aircraft powered by steam turbines mounted in an "engine room" in the fuselage and driving wing-mounted propellers. They intended to develop the idea using their large Bristol Braemar triplane bomber, initially modified to be powered by four 230 hp (172 kW) Siddeley Pumas and called, in anticipation of steam power the Tramp. They obtained Air Ministry support for this project, the Ministry appreciating the extra safety of an aircraft whose engines could be serviced in flight. The Ministry also issued specification 9/20 for a smaller aircraft of the same configuration and placed orders for two prototypes with Parnall, for the single-engined Possum and with Boulton & Paul for the twin-engined Bodmin. They were described as "Postal" aircraft but were clearly experimental bombers; all three types were built but only the Possum and the Bodmin flew.

The Possum was a single-bay triplane, with equal span, parallel chord wings without sweep or stagger. The lowest wing joined the lower fuselage longerons and the middle wing the upper longerons, with the upper wing held well above the fuselage on cabane struts. There were ailerons on all wings. The propeller shafts were mounted in the middle wing within small fairings and placed as close to the fuselage as the two-bladed, 9 ft 6 in (2.90 m) propellers would permit. One advantage of the triplane layout was that each propeller shaft could be symmetrically braced with a pair of X-shaped struts to the upper and lower wings. One set of Xs joined the forward spars and the other the rear. The wing structure was fabric-covered wood.

The fuselage was also wood; slab sided and plywood-covered, from the side the nose was rectangular but it was rounded in plan, rather like that of the Vickers Vimy. The front gunner 's position was slightly back from the nose, with the pilot's cockpit just behind it and well in front of the wings. A rear gunner's cockpit was placed at the trailing edge of the high set upper wing, the gunners' cockpits fitted with Scarff rings. The 450 hp Napier Lion engine, a water-cooled unit with 12 cylinders in W or broad arrow arrangement was placed at the centre of gravity inside the fuselage, though with its cylinder heads exposed. There was a radiator on each side of the fuselage near the trailing edge; unusually, these were hinged so that they could be adjusted in flight more or less directly into the slipstream as the pilot chose. The Lion was mounted in line with the fuselage, with its output close to the leading edge of the middle wing, where a bevel gear transmitted the power via drive shafts to gears behind the propellers. The propellers counter-rotated at low speeds.

At the rear of the Possum the fabric-covered wooden empennage was conventional. The fin had a straight and vertical leading edge but a curved top that blended into a rounded rudder which extended downwards between separate elevators; the tailplane was mounted just above the fuselage. Underneath, unusually for the time, there was a tailwheel rather than a skid, which was steerable and fitted with an automatic brake which provided increasing resistance with increasing load, unless the pilot overrode it. The main undercarriage was less innovative, with a pair of wheels single axle-mounted on short oleo legs to the wings with rear bracing.

Preliminary runs had resulted in an increase in rudder area before the Possum's maiden flight on 19 June 1923. It was piloted by Norman Macmillan, accompanied by the Possum's designer, Harold Bolas. On 15 April 1924 the Possum went to the Royal Aircraft Establishment at Farnborough and appeared at the RAF Hendon Air Pageant in June that year. After some delay a second Possum was built, flying in April 1925 and transferred to the Aeroplane and Armament Experimental Establishment at RAF Martlesham Heath in August 1925. They were both active at Martlesham some time thereafter.

== Specifications ==
Data from Wixey 1990, pp. 117

General characteristics

- Length: 39 ft 0 in (11.89 m)
- Wingspan: 46 ft 0 in (14.02 m)
- Height: 13 ft 9 in (4.19 m)
- Wing area: 777 sq ft (72.2 m^{2})
- Gross weight: 6,300 lb (2,858 kg)
- Powerplant: 1 × Napier Lion 12-cylinder W (broad arrow), water-cooled piston engine

Performance

- Maximum speed: 105 mph (169 km/h, 91 kn) approximately
- Cruise speed: 80 mph (130 km/h, 70 kn) approximately

== See also ==
Aircraft of comparable role, configuration, and era

- Boulton Paul Bodmin

== Notes ==
=== Cited sources ===
- Barnes, C.H. (1964). Bristol Aircraft since 1910. London: Putnam Publishing. ISBN 0-370-00015-3.
- Brew, Alec (1993). Boulton Paul Aircraft since 1915. London: Putnam. ISBN 0-85177-860-7.
- Wixey, Kenneth (1990). Parnall Aircraft since 1914. Annopolis: Naval Institute Press. ISBN 1-55750-930-1.
