= Gloster Goral =

Single-engined two-seat biplane

Goral
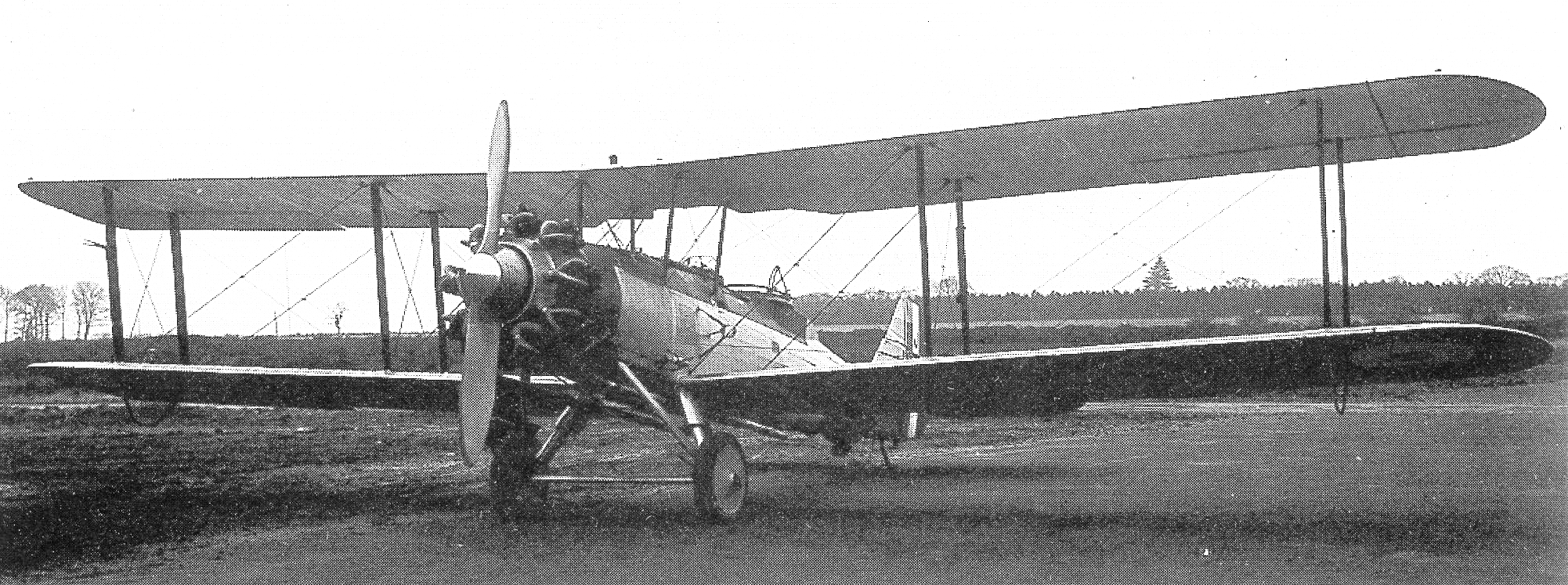

General information
- Type: General purpose military
- National origin: United Kingdom
- Manufacturer: Gloster Aircraft Company
- Designer: S.J. Waters & H.P.Folland
- Number built: 1

History
- First flight: 8 February 1927

The Gloster Goral was a single-engined two-seat biplane built to an Air Ministry contract for a general-purpose military aircraft in the late 1920s. It did not win the contest and only one was built.

== Development ==
In 1927, driven by conflicting pressures of an ageing, World War I aircraft stock and the continual need for economy the Air Ministry was attracted by the idea of a general-purpose, multi-tasking machine which used many components from the large stocks of Airco DH.9A accumulated ten years before. The result was Air Ministry specification 26/27, which also encouraged the use of a metal airframe for use overseas and of the abundant Napier Lion engine. At least eight manufacturers responded and the Goral was Gloster's submission.

The Goral was an all-metal framed, fabric-covered biplane using DH9A wings of two-bay construction and of slight stagger, with parallel interplane struts. There were ailerons on all wings. The fuselage was oval in cross section and quite slim. The wire-braced, round-tipped tailplane carried unbalanced elevators but the small fin carried a square-topped horn-balanced rudder. The pilot sat under the wing trailing edge cutout, with the gunner behind him, his gun on a ring, mounted on the raised rear decking. The undercarriage had a single axle strutted to the fuselage near the front spar and forward to the engine firewall.

The Goral was powered by an uncowled 425 hp (315 kW) Bristol Jupiter VIA radial engine rather than the suggested Lion, driving a 12 ft (3.65 m) two-bladed fixed-pitch propeller. The engine exhausts ran along both sides of the lower fuselage from the Goral's long nose to below the gunner's cockpit.

The Goral was designed to allow the wings to be replaced with those from existing DH.9A stocks and the fuselage was constructed so that metal components could be replaced by wooden ones to optimise the possibility of overseas sales. Nevertheless, these did not materialise, despite Argentinian interest as late as 1931. At home, the Goral had been in competition for the Air Ministry contract almost immediately after its first flight in February 1927. The competition winner was the Westland Wapiti.

== The name ==
Goral is the local name for a goat-antelope, native to the mountains of Northern India, Nemorhaedus goral.

== Specifications ==
Data from James 1971, pp. 139

General characteristics

- Crew: two
- Length: 31 ft 6 in (9.4 m)
- Wingspan: 46 ft 7 in (14.19 m)
- Height: 11 ft 4 in (3.3 m)
- Wing area: 494 sq ft (45.89 m^{2})
- Empty weight: 2,796 lb (1,268 kg)
- Gross weight: 4,441 lb (2,014 kg)
- Powerplant: 1 × Bristol Jupiter VIA 9-cylinder radial , 425 hp (315 kW)

Performance

- Maximum speed: 136 mph (218 km/h, 118 kn) at 5,000 ft (1,500 m)
- Range: 750 mi (1,207 km, 650 nmi)
- Endurance: 6 hours at 10,000 ft (3,000 m)
- Service ceiling: 21,500 ft (6,600 m)
- Rate of climb: 930 ft/min (4.7 m/s) to 15,000 ft (4,600 m)

Armament

- 1× synchronised forward firing 0.303 in (7.7 mm) Vickers machine gun
- 1× 0.303 in (7.7 mm) Lewis gun mounted on ring in gunner's cockpit
- provision for bomb racks carrying 2×230 lb (104 kg), 4×112 lb (50 kg) or 16×20 lb (9 kg) bombs

== See also ==
Aircraft of comparable role, configuration, and era

- Bristol Type 93A Beaver
- de Havilland DH.65 Hound
- Fairey IIIF
- Fairey Ferret
- Potez 25
- Vickers 131 Valiant
- Vickers 116 Vixen V
- Westland Wapiti

Related lists

- List of Gloster aircraft
