= Type 37 =

Type 37 may refer to:

- Bristol Type 37, British steam-powered passenger and airmail transport aircraft
- Bugatti Type 37, motor vehicle produced by the auto-maker Bugatti
- Peugeot Type 37, motor vehicle produced by the auto-maker Peugeot
- Type 037-II-class missile boat, missile equipped corvette built for the People's Liberation Army Navy
- Type 37 torpedo boat, class of warships built for Nazi Germany's Kriegsmarine
