= Boulton Paul Bodmin =

Bodmin

General information
- Type: Experimental bomber
- National origin: United Kingdom
- Manufacturer: Boulton & Paul Ltd
- Designer: John Dudley North
- Number built: 2

History
- First flight: 1924

The Boulton & Paul P.12 Bodmin was an experimental British twin-engined biplane bomber with its engines mounted in a fuselage engine room and with tandem pairs of tractor and pusher airscrews mounted between the wings. The two Bodmins built flew in 1924, proving the concept but the layout was not developed to production.

== Design and development ==
The Boulton & Paul Bodmin was one of the few multi-motor propeller-driven aircraft to have its engines in its fuselage. The concept arose immediately after World War I, when the British & Colonial Aeroplane Co. (soon renamed Bristol Aeroplane) began thinking about large transport aircraft powered by steam turbines mounted in an "engine room" in the fuselage and driving wing mounted propellers. They intended to develop the idea using their large Bristol Braemar triplane bomber, initially modified to be powered by four 230 hp (172 kW) Siddeley Pumas and called, in anticipation of steam power the Tramp. They gained Air Ministry support for this project, the Ministry appreciating the extra safety of an aircraft whose engines could be serviced in flight. The Ministry also issued Specification 9/20 for a smaller aircraft of the same configuration and placed orders for two prototypes with both Boulton & Paul for the twin-engined Bodmin and for the single-engined Parnall Possum They were described as "Postal" aircraft to cover the Ministry's intents but were clearly bombers. All three types were built but only the Bodmin and the Possum flew. It was recognised that the "engine room" arrangement came with a weight penalty owing to the gearing, clutches, drive shafts and supports, plus the need to strengthen wings but John Dudley North, the Boulton & Paul chief designer argued that the airframe weight would be reduced by 10 per cent due to the all-metal construction, as pioneered in the Boulton Paul P.10. This used tubes etc. produced in-house from steel sheet; the airframe was then fabric covered.

The Bodmin was a large three bay biplane with unswept and unstaggered square tipped wings of equal span and constant chord. These had leading-edge-balanced ailerons on upper and lower planes and the rather rectangular fin and tailplane carried similarly balanced control surfaces. The rudder extended below the fuselage underside. The fuselage centre section contained the "engine room" with its two 450 hp (336 kW) Napier Lions in tandem. One was ahead of the wing leading edge and the other at the wing centreline, with an enclosed, illuminated space between them where the engineer could stand upright and monitor them. The engines were mounted on the upper fuselage longerons, leaving a crawl space beneath.

The Lions were orientated with their gearboxes away from the engineer's room and the power from each was taken to the airscrews by two drive shafts at right angles to the fuselage. The two from the front engine drove a pair of two-bladed tractor propellers ahead of the leading edge via a pair of gearboxes halfway between the wings, just beyond the first interplane struts. Their mountings extended rearwards to carry a pair of four-bladed pusher propellers driven by the rear engine. Port and starboard airscrews rotated in opposite directions and the fore and aft pairs did likewise, so that either engine could be shut down without any power asymmetry. The centre section, engine drive shafts and propeller mountings were built as a unit independent of the wings, the drives having their own struts and bracing. The space between each fore and aft pair of propellers was occupied by a cylindrical petrol tank and thin radiators extended between these tanks and the fuselage. Radiators and driveshafts were enclosed by a streamlined fairing on either side.

The rest of the fuselage was conventional and of square cross section with rounded decking. The pilot sat well forward, behind a front gunner's position and the forward end chin shaped; the long front fuselage has been described as being "like the bow of an inverted boat". There was also provision for a dorsal gunner just behind the wings. The main wide tracked single axle undercarriage had pneumatic springing and damping; a pair of smaller wheels further ahead and closer together served to prevent nose-overs and a standard tail skid extended below the rudder.

The first of two Bodmins flew early in 1924. It flew well, though with some drive and cooling problems and showed that despite Bristol's problems with the Tramp the fuselage mounted engine arrangement was workable. John North had been able to compensate the extra weight of this configuration by the savings of metal construction, which he estimated after the Bodmin was built to be as high as 20 per cent, a factor of two better than his design estimate. The safety bonus of engines that could be adjusted and mended in the air, the most important reason behind the layout was achieved. The maximum speed and climb rate of the Bodmin were marginally better than those of the identically powered though slightly smaller metal-framed Boulton & Paul Bugle II.

The Bodmin could fly level on one engine and there was no asymmetry of thrust unlike a conventional twin-engine design. The first prototype was written off due to undercarriage failure and the trials were completed with the second. The "engine room" concept did not catch on but all-metal airframes served later aircraft well.

== Specifications ==
Data from

General characteristics

- Length: 53 ft 4 1/2 in (16.269 m)
- Wingspan: 70 ft 0 in (21.34 m)
- Wing area: 1,204 sq ft (111.9 m^{2})
- Empty weight: 7,920 lb (3,592 kg)
- Gross weight: 11,000 lb (4,990 kg)
- Powerplant: 2 × Napier Lion water cooled W-12 piston engine, 450 hp (340 kW) each

Performance

- Maximum speed: 116 mph (187 km/h, 101 kn) at sea level
- Service ceiling: 16,000 ft (4,900 m)
- Time to altitude: 8 min 9 s to 6,500 ft (2,000 m)

== See also ==
Related development

- Parnall Possum
- Bristol Tramp
