= Bristol Boarhound =

British army cooperation and liaison aircraft

Boarhound
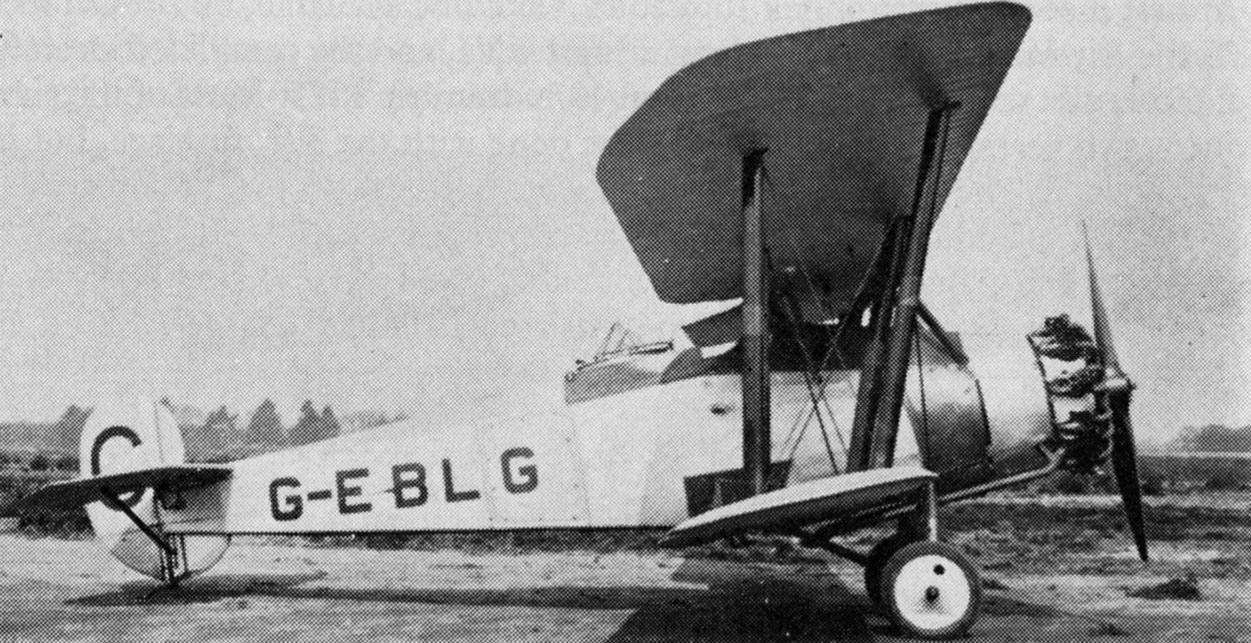
- Boarhound I

General information
- Type: Army co-operation
- Manufacturer: Bristol
- Designer: Frank Barnwell
- Primary user: Mexico
- Number built: 4

History
- Introduction date: 1928
- First flight: 8 June 1925

The Bristol Boarhound was a British army cooperation and liaison aircraft of the 1920s. It was a two-seat biplane with wings of equal span and a steel frame construction with fabric covering.

== Design and development ==
The Boarhound was built as a private venture under Air Ministry Specification 8/24 (later superseded by Specification 20/25) for an Army cooperation aircraft to replace the Bristol Fighter, first flying on 8 June 1925 as the Type 93 Boarhound.

The Boarhound, designed by Captain Frank Barnwell, was a two-bay biplane which used a method of steel construction which involved high-tensile steel strips rolled into cusped and flanged sections, which were riveted together to form longerons and struts. The resulting structure was lighter, stronger, and cheaper than one made from drawn tubes. It had a deep fuselage allowing bulky radio and camera equipment to be carried, and was powered by a Bristol Jupiter IV engine with variable timing.

The Boarhound was evaluated alongside the Armstrong Whitworth Atlas, de Havilland Hyena and Vickers Vespa. The Jupiter's variable timing gear gave poorer power at low altitudes, a disadvantage for an army cooperation aircraft, and the Atlas was considered superior.

The Directors of Bristol decided, however, to continue development of the aircraft as a private venture for a general-purpose bomber to replace the Airco DH.9A. A second aircraft was therefore built, the Type 93A Beaver, which flew on 23 February 1927. This was rejected in favour of the Fairey IIIF, which used the preferred Napier Lion engine, of which large numbers were in store.

The Boarhound I (registered G-EBLG) and the Beaver (registered G-EBQF) were withdrawn from use at Filton Aerodrome in April 1927.

A further two aircraft were produced as reconnaissance fighters as the Type 93B Boarhound II.

== Operational history ==
The only two Boarhound IIs ever built were sold to Mexico in 1928 and were used against rebel forces in April 1929. The Boarhounds proved successful in Mexican service, their metal structure proving suitable for the climate. Two legends of the Mexican Air Force flew the Boarhound II: Pablo Sidar and Alfonso Cruz Rivera.

== Variants ==
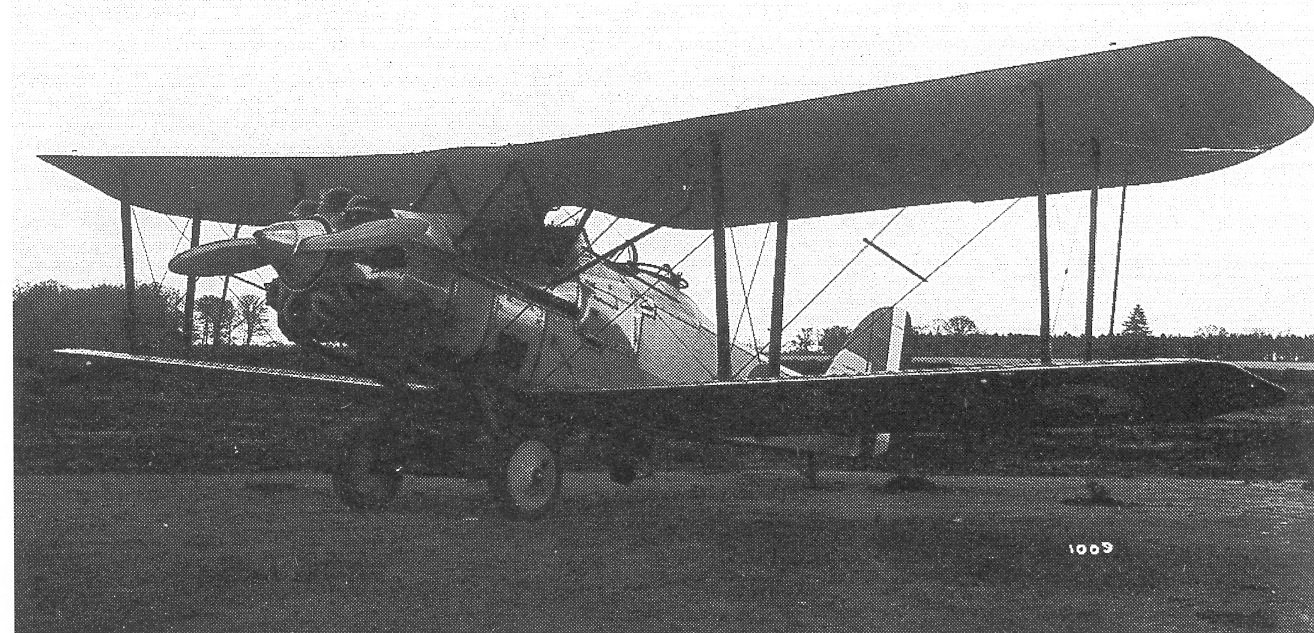
Type 93A in 1927

Type 93 Boarhound
Army cooperation aircraft, powered by a Jupiter IV engine. One built
Type 93A Beaver
General-purpose aircraft. One built.
Type 93B Boarhound II
Fighter-reconnaissance aircraft for Mexico, powered by 450 hp (340 kW) Jupiter VI engine. Two built.

== Operators ==
Mexico

- Mexican Air Force

United Kingdom

== Specifications (Boarhound I) ==
Data from Bristol Aircraft Since 1910

General characteristics

- Crew: 2
- Length: 31 ft 6 in (9.60 m)
- Wingspan: 44 ft 9 in (13.64 m)
- Height: 11 ft 8 in (3.56 m)
- Wing area: 464 sq ft (43.1 m^{2})
- Empty weight: 2,900 lb (1,315 kg)
- Gross weight: 4,460 lb (2,023 kg)
- Powerplant: 1 × Bristol Jupiter IV 9-cylinder air-cooled radial piston engine, 425 hp (317 kW)
- Propellers: 2-bladed fixed-pitch propeller

Performance

- Maximum speed: 137 mph (220 km/h, 119 kn)
- Endurance: 3 hours
- Service ceiling: 22,000 ft (6,700 m)
- Time to altitude: 10,000 ft (3,048 m) in 10 minutes 38 seconds
- Wing loading: 9.61 lb/sq ft (46.9 kg/m^{2})
- Power/mass: 0.095 hp/lb (0.156 kW/kg)

Armament

- Guns:

- 1 × forward-firing .303 in (7.7 mm) Vickers machine gun on side of fuselage
- 1 × .303 in (7.7 mm) Lewis Gun on Scarff ring (observer)

- Bombs:

- 2 × 112 lb (50 kg) bombs

== See also ==
Aircraft of comparable role, configuration, and era

- Aero A.32
- Armstrong Whitworth Atlas
- de Havilland Hound
- de Havilland Hyena
- Fairey IIIF
- Fairey Ferret
- Gloster Goral
- Potez 25
- Short Shamois
- Vickers Vespa
- Vickers Valiant
- Vickers Vixen
- Westland Wapiti
