= Vickers Venture =

Venture
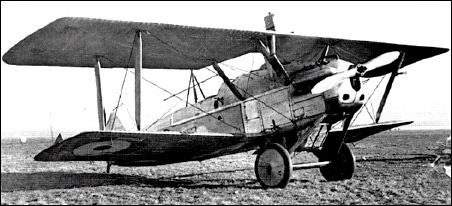

General information
- Type: Reconnaissance aircraft
- Manufacturer: Vickers
- Primary user: Royal Air Force
- Number built: 6

History
- First flight: 3 June 1924
- Developed from: Vickers Vixen

The Vickers Type 94 Venture was a British army cooperation biplane of the 1920s, designed and built by Vickers, as a development of the Vixen. While six were built for the Royal Air Force, they were found unsuitable and were used for experimental work.

== Development and design ==
The Venture was a further development of the Vixen II to meet the requirements of Air Ministry Specification 45/23, six aircraft being ordered. The Venture, like the Vixen which formed its basis, was a single-bay biplane with a steel tube fuselage and wooden wings. It used the wings of the Vixen II with the lengthened fuselage of the Vixen III. The first Venture flew at the Vickers factory at Brooklands on 3 June 1924, being sent to the Aeroplane and Armament Experimental Establishment at Martlesham for evaluation. While demonstrating what was said to be "docile" handling, further testing showed that the aircraft had poor longitudinal stability, had a long landing run and was considered too large for use in army cooperation, where it would be expected to operate out of small airstrips. While it underwent brief service trials with No. 4 Squadron, the six Ventures were relegated to experimental purposes, the final aircraft being struck off charge in January 1933.

== Operators ==
United Kingdom

- Royal Air Force

== Specifications (Venture) ==
Data from The British Bomber since 1914

General characteristics

- Crew: 2
- Length: 32 ft 0 in (9.75 m)
- Wingspan: 40 ft 0 in (12.19 m)
- Height: 13 ft 3 in (4.04 m)
- Wing area: 526 sq ft (48.9 m^{2})
- Empty weight: 3,140 lb (1,424 kg)
- Gross weight: 4,890 lb (2,218 kg)
- Powerplant: 1 × Napier Lion I 12-cylinder water-cooled broad arrow engine, 450 hp (340 kW)

Performance

- Maximum speed: 129 mph (208 km/h, 112 kn) at 10,000 ft (3,000 m)
- Service ceiling: 19,200 ft (5,900 m)

Armament

- Guns:
  - 2 × forward-firing .303 in (7.7 mm) Vickers machine guns
  - 1 × .303 in (7.7 mm) Lewis Gun on Scarff ring in observers cockpit
- Bombs: 4× 112 lb (51 kg) bombs on underwing racks

== See also ==
Related development

- Vickers Vixen
- Vickers Valparaiso

Related lists

- List of aircraft of the Royal Air Force
