= Vickers Vixen =

British biplane

Vixen
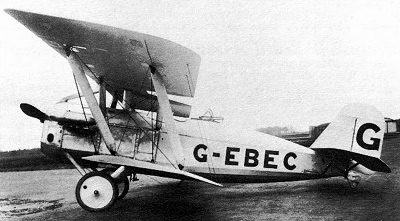
- Vickers Vixen

General information
- Type: Light Bomber / Reconnaissance / Fighter
- Manufacturer: Vickers
- Primary user: Chile
- Number built: 20

History
- First flight: February 1923
- Variants: Vickers Venture; Vickers Valparaiso

The Vickers Vixen was a British general-purpose biplane of the 1920s. Designed and developed by Vickers in a number of variants, with 18 Vixen Mark V sold to Chile. A prototype of a version with metal wings was built as the Vickers Vivid. The Vixen also formed the basis of the closely related Venture and Valparaiso aircraft, which were also built and sold in small numbers in the 1920s

== Development and design ==
In 1922, Vickers designed a two-seat biplane as a private venture as a possible replacement for the Airco DH.9A and Bristol F.2 Fighter. Building on the experience of the unsuccessful wartime FB.14 fighter-reconnaissance aircraft, the Vixen was a single-bay biplane with a steel tube fuselage and wooden wings, powered by a 450 hp (340 kW) Napier Lion engine. The first prototype aircraft, the Type 71 Vixen I, given the civil registration G-EBEC, flew in February 1923. It was tested at Martlesham Heath and showed good performance, prompting modification to a day bomber role as the Type 87 Vixen II, which was fitted with a ventral radiator between the undercarriage legs replacing the car-type radiator of the Vixen I, first flying in this form on 13 August 1923. The Vixen I and II formed the basis of the Venture army co-operation aircraft for the Royal Air Force and the Valparaiso for export purposes.

The next version of the Vixen was the Vickers Type 91 Vixen III, first flying in April 1924 which was fitted with larger wings (with wingspan of 44 ft/13.4 m rather than 34 ft 6 in/10.5 m earlier aircraft) for increased performance at altitude, and reverted to a nose-mounted radiator. The Vixen III was tested with both wheel and float undercarriages, and was later converted back to a landplane, and used for air racing, competing in the 1925, 1926 and 1927 King's Cup Races. The Vixen III formed the basis of the Type 116 Vixen V, fitted with a high-compression Lion V engine and a modified tail, of which 18 were purchased by Chile.

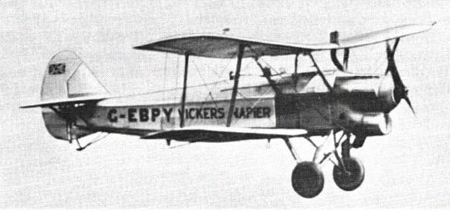
Vickers Vivid

The Vixen II prototype was modified to use the more powerful Rolls-Royce Condor engine at the end of 1924 as the Type 105 Vixen IV, which was intended for use as a night fighter. While it showed improved performance over the Lion-powered versions, it was not successful, and was modified with the enlarged wings of the Vixen III as a general-purpose aircraft (the Type 124 Vixen VI) for evaluation as a private venture entry to meet the requirements of Air Ministry Specification 26/27, competing against the Bristol Beaver, Fairey Ferret, de Havilland Hound, Gloster Goral, Westland Wapiti, and Vickers' own Valiant. The Vixen was rejected on the grounds that the Condor engine was too heavy and powerful for the role.

When the problems encountered by the wooden wings of the Vixen V in Chile were realised, it was decided to produce a version with metal wings. This was initially designated Vixen VII, but was soon renamed Vickers Vivid. The Vixen III prototype was rebuilt with metal wings to become the Type 130 Vivid, first flying in this form on 27 June 1927, powered by a Lion VA engine, later being re-engined with a 540 hp (400 kW) Lion XI as the Type 146 Vivid. The Vivid was evaluated by Romania, but no orders resulted, with the prototype being sold to a private buyer in 1931, being destroyed in a fire at Chelmsford in 1932.

== Operational history ==
The Military Aviation Service of Chile placed an initial order for twelve Vixen Vs in May 1925, this being increased to 18 in July. While prone to engine problems owing to the problems with the special fuel (2/3 petrol to 1/3 benzol) required for the high-compression Lion V engine, and requiring frequent re-rigging owing to the use of wooden wings in the high temperature of Northern Chile, the Vixen Vs, operated by the Grupo Mixto de Aviación N° 3. were popular in Chilean service, being used for long-distance flights of several hundred miles and continued in service for several years. The surviving Vixens transferred to the Chilean Air Force when it was formed from the aviation services of the Chilean Army and Navy in March 1930. Two Vixens participated in a bombing raid against mutinying ships of the Chilean Navy (including the Battleship Almirante Latorre) during the Sailors' mutiny of September 1931. In 1932, an additional Vixen was assembled from spare parts at the Maestranza Central de Aviación (Central Aviation Workshop) at El Bosque. This aircraft had an enclosed cabin and was used for photo survey missions, replacing a Junkers W34. The last Vixens were retired by Chile in 1936.

After rejection by the Royal Air Force, the Vixen VI, piloted by the Test pilot Joseph Summers and Colonel Charles Russell of the Irish Air Corps, carried the first Irish Air Mail, between Galway and London.

== Variants ==
Type 71 Vixen I
Prototype fighter-reconnaissance aircraft. Powered by 450 hp (340 kW) Napier Lion Engine.
Type 87 Vixen II
Conversion of Vixen I prototype as light bomber.
Type 91 Vixen III
Version with larger wings for improved high-altitude performance. One built.
Type 105 Vixen IV
Further modification of Vixen II with 650 hp (490 kW) Rolls-Royce Condor III engine for use as night fighter.
Type 106 Vixen III
Modification of Type 91 for entry in the 1925 King's Cup Air Race.

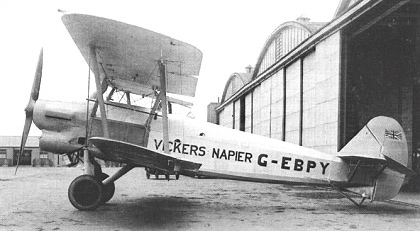
Vickers Vivid

Type 116 Vixen V
General purpose aircraft for Chile, powered by high compression Lion V engine. 18 built.
Type 124 Vixen VI
Modification of Vixen IV as general purpose aircraft. Powered by Rolls-Royce Condor IIIA engine. No production.
Type 130 Vivid
Modification of Vixen III prototype with metal wings and powered by Lion VA engine.
Type 142 Vivid
Type 130 prototype re-engined with Lion XI. No production.
Type 148 Vixen III
Further single-seat modification of Type 106 Vixen III for air racing. Finished second in 1926 King's Cup race and third in 1927.

== Operators ==
Chile

- Chilean Air Force

== Specifications (Vixen V) ==
Data from Vickers Aircraft Since 1908

General characteristics

- Crew: 2
- Length: 29 ft 0 in (8.84 m)
- Upper wingspan: 44 ft 0 in (13.41 m)
- Lower wingspan: 38 ft 6 in (11.73 m)
- Height: 12 ft 0 in (3.66 m)
- Wing area: 590 sq ft (55 m^{2})
- Empty weight: 3,320 lb (1,506 kg)
- Gross weight: 5,080 lb (2,304 kg)
- Powerplant: 1 × Napier Lion V 12-cylinder water-cooled W-block, 500 hp (370 kW)

Performance

- Maximum speed: 113.7 mph (183.0 km/h, 98.8 kn) at sea level
- Range: 764 mi (1,230 km, 664 nmi)
- Service ceiling: 20,000 ft (6,100 m) (absolute ceiling)
- Rate of climb: 1,250 ft/min (6.4 m/s)
- Time to altitude: 25 min to 15,000 ft (4,600 m)

== See also ==
Related development

- Vickers Venture

Aircraft of comparable role, configuration, and era

- Curtiss Falcon
- de Havilland DH.65 Hound
- Douglas XA-2
- Fairey IIIF
- Gloster Goral
- Potez 25
- Vickers Valiant
