= Gloster Guan =

Guan
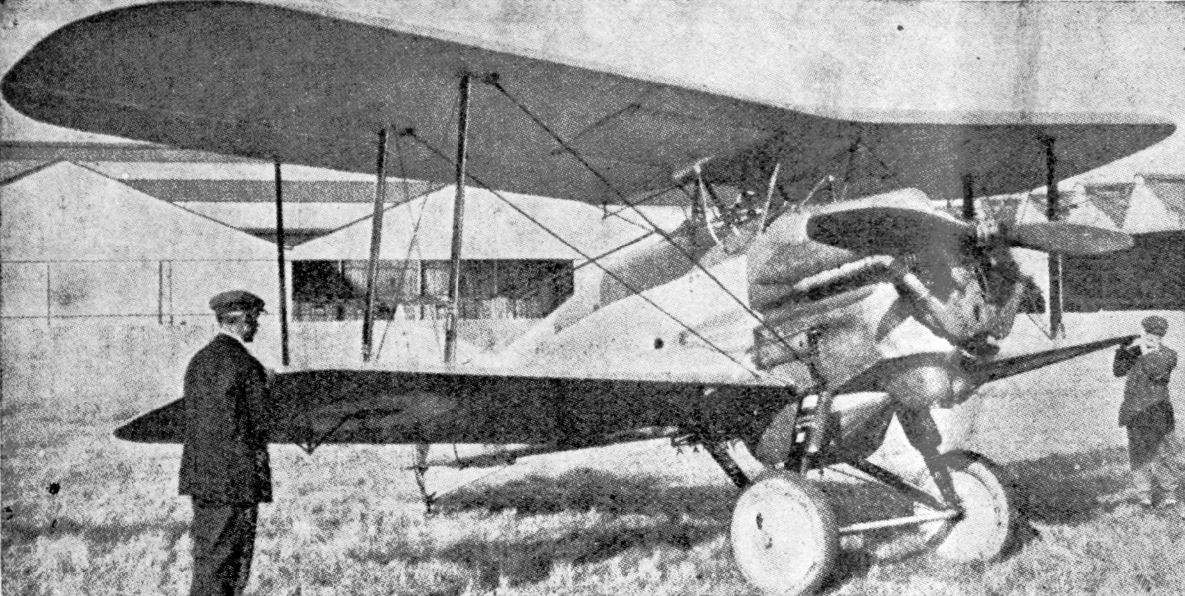

General information
- Type: Experimental fighter
- National origin: United Kingdom
- Manufacturer: Gloucestershire Aircraft Company
- Designer: H.P.Folland
- Primary user: Royal Aircraft Establishment
- Number built: 2

History
- First flight: June 1926

The Gloster Guan was a single-engined single-seat experimental biplane fighter built in the United Kingdom to test the performance of fighters using supercharged engines at high altitudes. Three were planned but only two constructed.

== Development ==
The power output of piston engines falls with altitude because of the falling oxygen density. As a result, performance falls away and the operational ceiling is limited. Gloster had, with the Gorcock produced an aircraft much faster than its contemporaries and the Guan was designed to use supercharging to maintain this performance at height and raise the service ceiling above its competition.

Three Guans were ordered by the Air Ministry in 1925. As in the Gorcock, power came from variants of the Napier Lion broad arrow 12-cylinder engine. The first Guan had the 450 hp (335 kW) geared Lion IV; the second the ungeared 525 hp (475 kW) Lion VI. A projected third aircraft would have had an inverted Lion, known as the Lioness, but this machine was not built. These engines had their exhaust-driven supercharger (a concept nowadays known as turbocharger) mounted on the nose under the propeller, with much exposed pipework. The radiator was mounted under the fuselage and between the undercarriage legs. Initially these engines drove two-blade fixed-pitch airscrews, but the first aircraft was later fitted with a metal variable-pitch constant-speed propeller.

The Guan was a single-bay biplane with wooden, fabric-covered wings of unequal span and marked stagger. All Folland's Gloster fighters from the Grebe onwards had used a thick upper wing in combination with a fairly thin lower wing and the Guan followed this pattern, chosen to provide low drag at high speed with good lift at low, take-off speeds. It had parallel interplane struts and ailerons on all wings.

The fuselage was all-metal and fabric covered. The rear fuselage was closer in design to that of the Gamecock than the Grebe or Gorcock, and the empennage was almost identical to that of the Gamecock.

The first aircraft went to RAE Farnborough in August 1926 and the second followed early in the next year. Supercharging delivered the anticipated performance enhancements, with full power and a top speed of 175 mph (280 km/h) at 15,000 ft (4,570 m). Service ceiling was 31,000 ft (9,450 m) compared with 24,000 ft (7,315 m) for the similarly-powered but slightly smaller-span Gorcock. The fast-spinning turbo-superchargers gave continual trouble. This led to the cancellation of the third Guan and the whole development programme.

== The name ==
Gloster's search for alliterative bird names took them far and wide. Guan is the local name for one of several genera of game-birds of the family Cracidae, which live in tropical America.

== Specifications (second Guan) ==
Data from James 1971, pp. 134–5

General characteristics

- Crew: 1
- Length: 22 ft 0 in (6.7 m)
- Wingspan: 31 ft 10 in (9.69 m)
- Height: 10 ft 2 in (3.29 m)
- Wing area: 298 sq ft (27.68 m^{2})
- Empty weight: 2,972 lb (1,348 kg)
- Gross weight: 3,803 lb (1,725 kg)
- Powerplant: 1 × Napier Lion VI broad arrow 12-cylinder water-cooled , 525 hp (475 kW)

Performance

- Maximum speed: 175 mph (281 km/h, 152 kn) at 15,000 ft (4,600 m)
- Service ceiling: 31,000 ft (9,450 m)
- Rate of climb: 1,600 ft/min (8 m/s) to 20,000 ft (6,100 m)
