= Fairey Ferret =

1930s British general-purpose biplane

Ferret
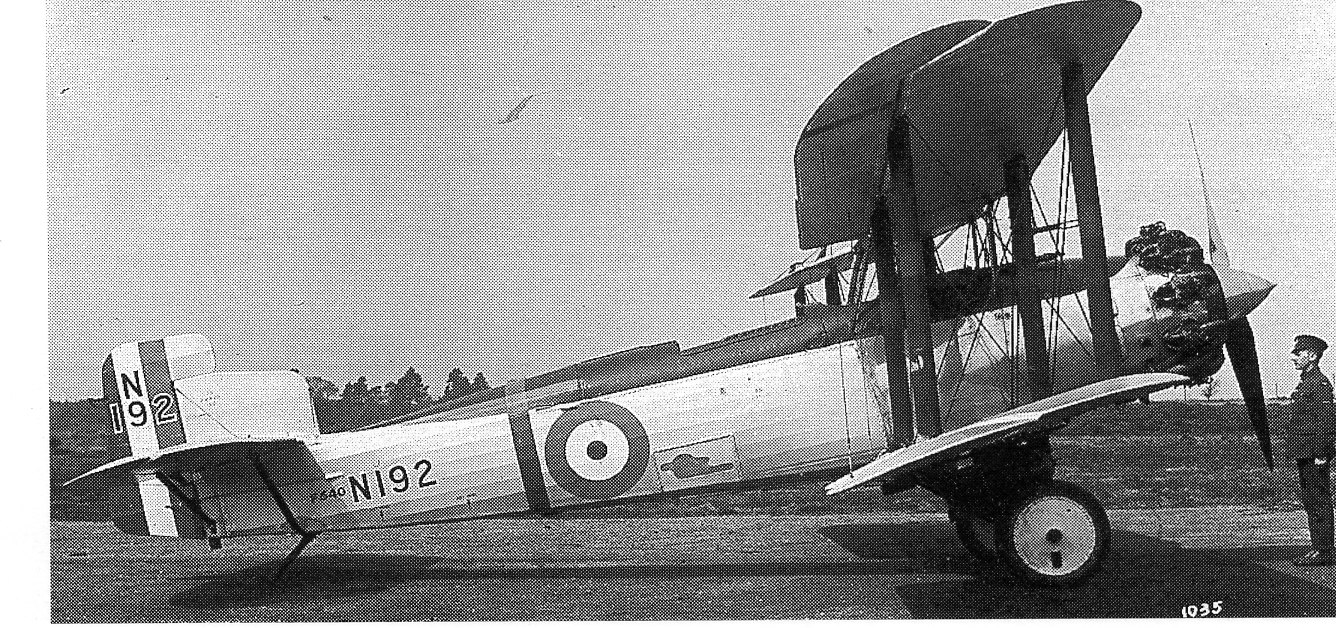
- Ferret Mk.III

General information
- Type: Two-seat general-purpose biplane
- National origin: United Kingdom
- Manufacturer: Fairey Aviation Company
- Number built: 3

History
- First flight: June 1925

The Fairey Ferret was a 1930s British general-purpose biplane designed and built by the Fairey Aviation Company. It performed well in trials but was not ordered into production.

== Development ==
The Ferret was designed to meet a Fleet Air Arm requirement defined by specification 37/22 for a reconnaissance aircraft; it was the company's first all-metal design. With a lack of interest from the FAA the company proposed the design to meet a Royal Air Force requirement for a general-purpose biplane.

The company built three prototypes, two were three-seaters (to meet the naval requirement) and the third was a two-seater. The two-seater Ferret III was also fitted with a new Fairey-designed high-speed gun mounting in the rear cockpit. The first prototype first flew in June 1925 powered by a 400 hp (298 kW) Armstrong Siddeley Jaguar IV radial engine. The other two aircraft had a nine-inch extension to the wingspan and both were fitted with a 425 hp (317 kW) Bristol Jupiter radial engine.

The aircraft performed well during trials at RAF Martlesham Heath but was not ordered into production.

== Variants ==
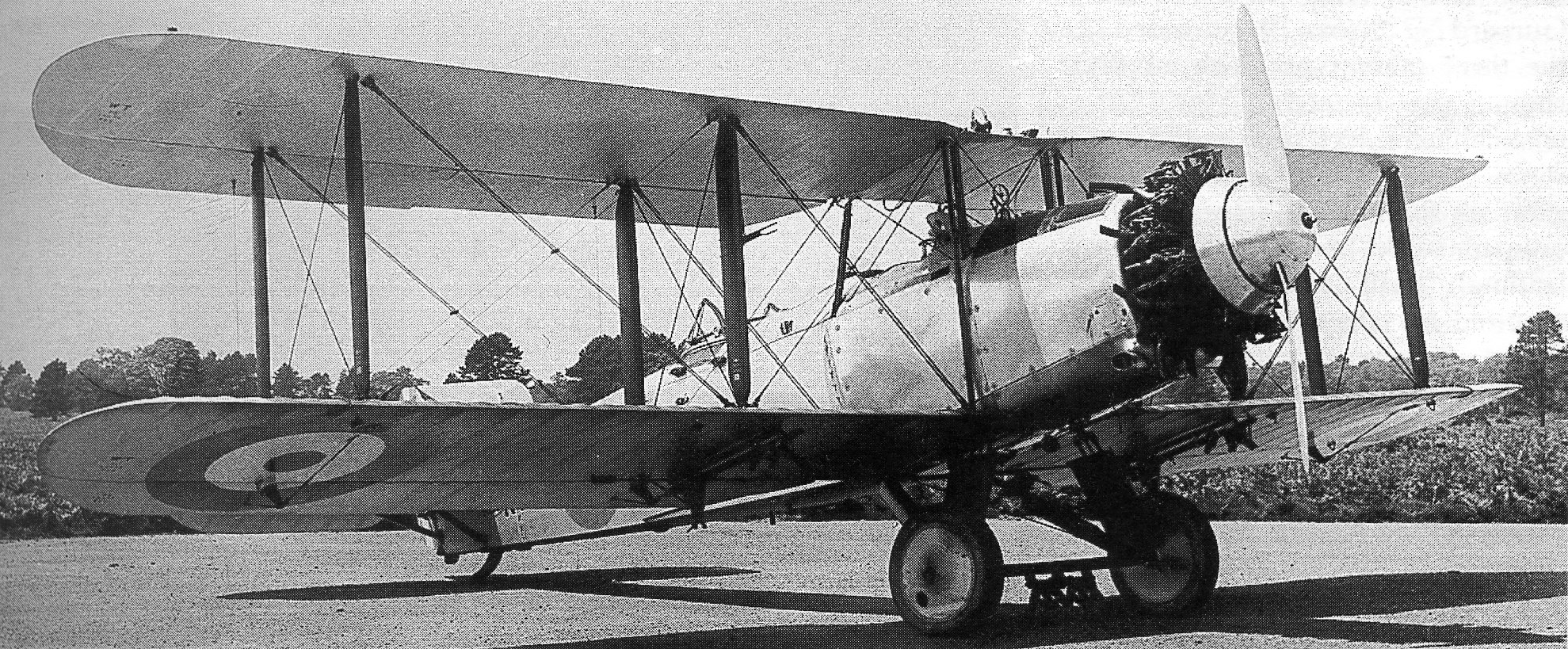
Fairey Ferret I

Ferret Mk I
Three-seat prototype powered by a 400hp (298kW) Armstrong Siddeley Jaguar IVl radial engine, one built.
Ferret Mk II
Three-seat prototype powered by a 425hp (317kW) Bristol Jupiter radial engine, one built.
Ferret Mk III
Two-seat prototype powered by a 425hp (317kW) Bristol Jupiter radial engine, one built.

== Specifications (Ferret III) ==
Data from

General characteristics

- Crew: two
- Length: 29 ft 6 in (8.99 m)
- Wingspan: 40 ft 7 in (12.37 m)
- Height: 10 ft 3 in (3.12 m)
- Wing area: 380 sq ft (35.30 m^{2})
- Empty weight: 2,583 lb (1,172 kg)
- Gross weight: 4,765 lb (2,161 kg)
- Powerplant: 1 × Bristol Jupiter VI 9-cylinder radial engine , 425 hp (317 kW)

Performance

- Maximum speed: 135 mph (217 km/h, 117 kn) at 5,000 ft (1,524 m)
- Service ceiling: 15,500 ft (4,725 m)
- Rate of climb: 920 ft/min (4.67 m/s) initial

Armament

- 1 × fixed forward-firing 0.303in (7.7mm) Vickers machine-gun (on starboard side of fuselage)
- 1 × 0.303in (7.7mm) Lewis machine-gun in rear cockpit
- Up to 500lb (227kg) bombs fitted under wings

== See also ==
Aircraft of comparable role, configuration, and era

- Bristol Type 93A Beaver
- de Havilland DH.65 Hound
- Fairey IIIF
- Gloster Goral
- Hawker Hedgehog
- Potez 25
- Vickers 131 Valiant
- Vickers 116 Vixen V
- Westland Wapiti

Related lists

- List of Fairey aircraft
