= Alliance P.2 Seabird =

British biplane

General information
- Type: Long-range biplane
- National origin: United Kingdom
- Manufacturer: Alliance Aeroplane Company
- Designer: James Arthur Peters
- Number built: 2

History
- First flight: 1919

The Alliance P.2 Seabird was a British single-engined long-range biplane designed by J.A. Peters to enter the Daily Mail £10,000 Atlantic Flight Prize. In the end it did not compete but became the first aircraft to fly from London (Acton) to Madrid non-stop on 31 July 1919.

== Design and development ==
The Alliance Aeroplane Company which had constructed aircraft under licence during the First World War decided to build aircraft for the civil market. The Seabird was a long-range two-seat biplane powered by a 450 hp (336 kW) Napier Lion piston engine. With an endurance of 21 hours it had an enclosed cabin for the crew of two and two aircraft were built.

== Operational history ==
On 17 April 1919 Peters the designer paid the £100 entrance fee to the Royal Aero Club as entry fee for the Alliance biplane into the competition for the Daily Mail £10,000 Atlantic Flight Prize. Flown by Peters with Captain W.R. Curtis of the Royal Air Force the first Seabird (registration G-EAGL) carried out a trial flight on 31 July 1919 when it made the first direct non-stop flight between London and Madrid, 900 miles in just under eight hours. The aircraft did not in the end compete in the Atlantic competition.

The second aircraft G-EAOX was entered into an Australian Government prize of £10,000 for a flight from Great Britain to Australia. Flown by two Australian airmen, Lieutenant Roger Douglas (pilot) and Lieutenant J.S.L. Ross (Navigator), G-EAOX left Hounslow Heath Aerodrome on 13 November 1919 but a few minutes into the flight the Seabird crashed near Surbiton killing both airmen.

The company never recovered from the accident and was closed down in 1920.

== Specifications ==
Data from British Civil Aircraft since 1919 Volume 1

General characteristics

- Crew: 2
- Length: 33 ft 6 in (10.21 m)
- Wingspan: 53 ft 0 in (16.16 m)
- Wing area: 700 sq ft (65.1 m^{2})
- Empty weight: 2,600 lb (1,179 kg)
- Gross weight: 7,400 lb (3,357 kg)
- Powerplant: 1 × Napier Lion piston engine , 450 hp (336 kW)

Performance

- Maximum speed: 140 mph (225 km/h, 120 kn)
- Range: 3,000 mi (4,828 km, 2,600 nmi)
- Endurance: 21 hours 0 minutes
