= Gloster Gorcock =

UK biplane fighter aircraft

Gorcock
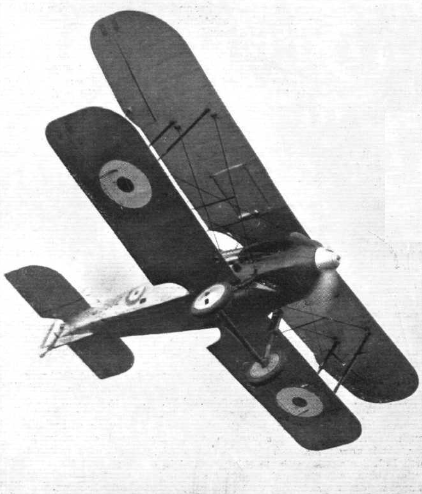

General information
- Type: Experimental single-seat fighter
- National origin: United Kingdom
- Manufacturer: Gloucestershire Aircraft Company
- Designer: H.P.Folland
- Primary user: Royal Aircraft Establishment
- Number built: 3

History
- First flight: 1925

The Gloster Gorcock was a single-engined single-seat biplane fighter aircraft produced to a United Kingdom Air Ministry contract completed in 1927. Only three were built.

== Development ==
In May 1924 Glosters received an Air Ministry contract for three experimental biplane single-seat fighters. They were intended to develop metal-framed aircraft, with the first two to have steel fuselages and wooden wings (all fabric covered) and the third to have an all-steel airframe. They were to be powered by a Napier Lion engine which had been used in the racing Gloster III and was a water-cooled motor with three banks of four cylinders in an upright broad arrow arrangement. Another intention was to compare aircraft performance with direct-drive and down-geared propellers.

The Gorcock was a single-bay biplane with strong stagger and unequal span wings, having a strong resemblance to the Gamecock. The inline engine allowed a smoother, longer and more pointed nose and increased the length by about 6 ft 5 in (1.95 m); the span was slightly less than the Gamecock's. The first Gorcock had a Lion IV engine, geared and producing 450 hp (335 kW) and the second an ungeared Lion VIII of 525 hp (390 kW). The radiator was mounted on the fuselage underside, between the undercarriage legs. Both engines drove fixed-pitch wooden two-blade, 9 ft (2.74 m) diameter propellers. Initially both these machines had Grebe style rudders, squared off with no balance; these were later replaced with Gamecock rudders, vertically extended to include a horn balance.

The final, all-metal Gorcock had the geared Lion IV; this was Gloster's first all-metal aircraft. It had a top speed of 174 mph (280 km/h) at 5,000 ft (1,525 m), some 30 mph (48 km/h) faster than contemporary fighters. All three aircraft were delivered by June 1927.

Both Glosters and RAE Farnborough used the Gorcocks for research for several years. The second machine, for example was used for airscrew experiments, flying in 1929 with a variety of duralumin propellers. The Gorcocks were also fitted with a variety of ventral radiators of different cross-sections and intake configurations. Despite their research role, the Gorcocks flew armed with two Vickers machine guns in the nose.

== Name origin ==
According to the Oxford English Dictionary, gorcock is a Scottish and Northern English name for the male of the red grouse. Some sources (but not the OED) suggest a connection between gore and red, but originally gore meant dung, filth or slime.

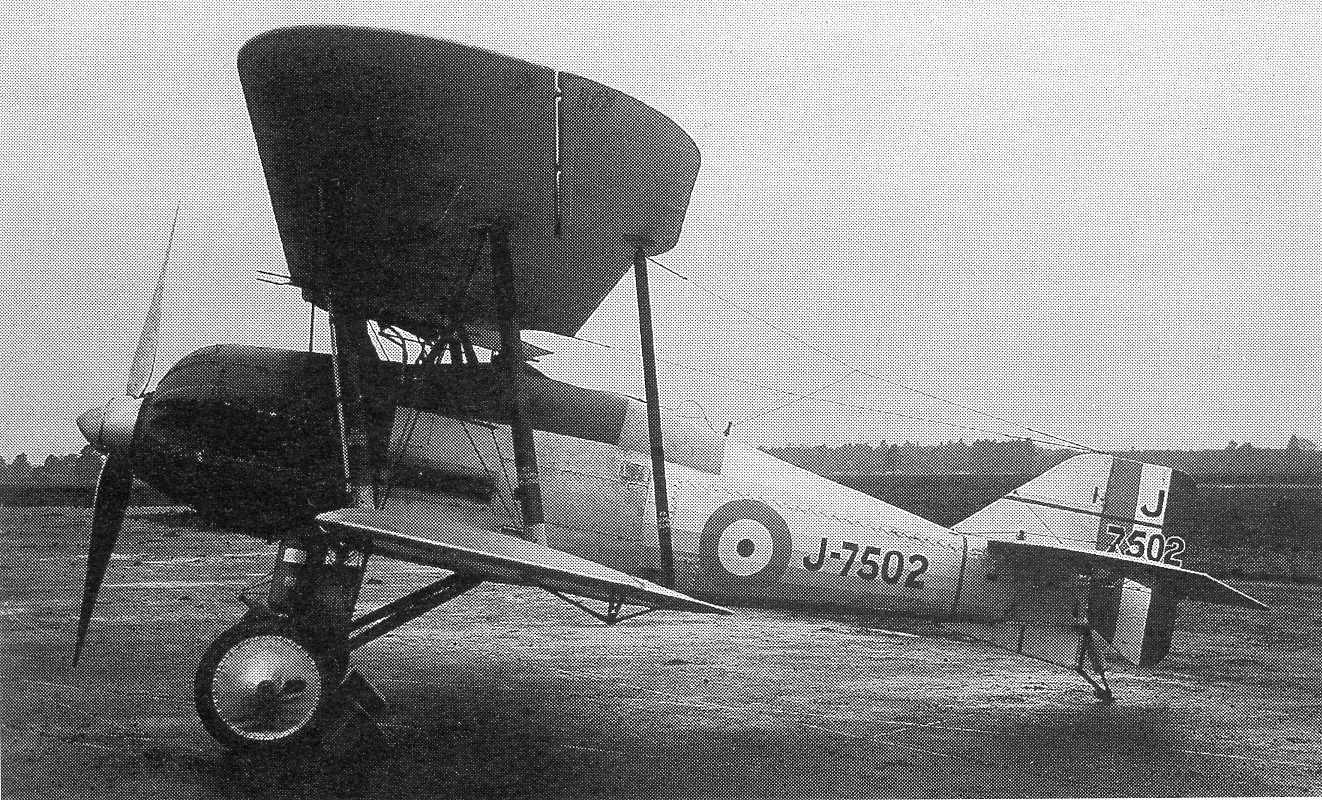
Second Gorcock with a Napier Lion VIII engine

== Specifications (first Gorcock) ==
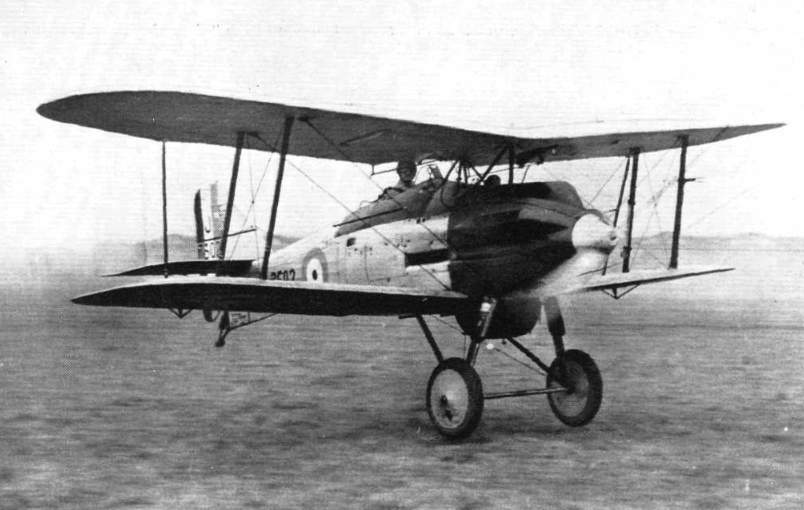

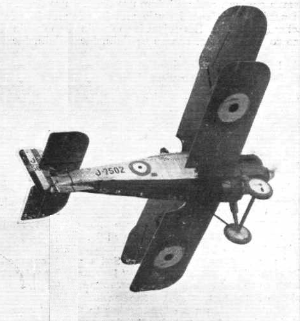

Data from James 1971, pp. 132–3

General characteristics

- Crew: 1
- Length: 26 ft 1 in (7.94 m)
- Wingspan: 28 ft 6 in (8.68 m)
- Height: 10 ft 3 in (3.11 m)
- Wing area: 250 sq ft (23.22 m^{2})
- Empty weight: 2,364 lb (1,098 kg)
- Gross weight: 3,179 lb (1,442 kg)
- Powerplant: 1 × Napier Lion IV 12-cylinder broad arrow water-cooled , 450 hp (335 kW)

Performance

- Maximum speed: 164 mph (263 km/h, 143 kn) at 5,000 ft (1,500 m)
- Endurance: 1.8 hours
- Service ceiling: 24,000 ft (7,315 m)
- Rate of climb: 1,364 ft/min (6.93 m/s) to 15,000 ft (4,600 m)

Armament

- 2 × 0.303 in (7.7 mm) Vickers machine guns in troughs each side of nose
