= Vickers 131 Valiant =

British general-purpose biplane

Valiant
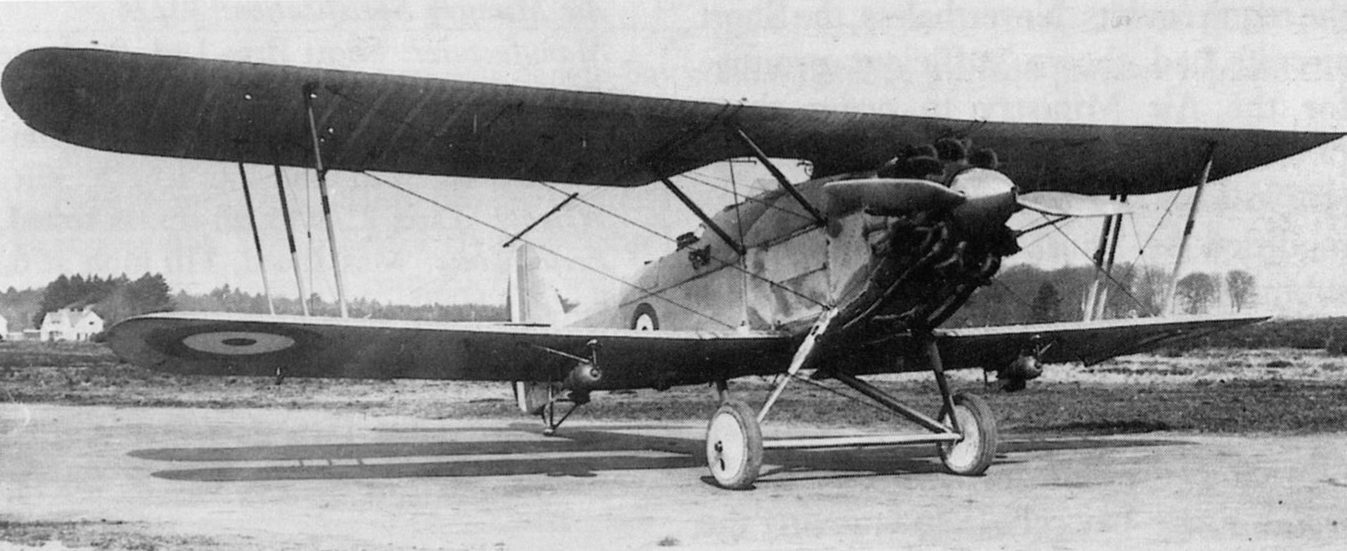
- Vickers 131 Valiant at Martlesham Heath, 1927

General information
- Type: General purpose biplane
- National origin: United Kingdom
- Manufacturer: Vickers Limited
- Primary user: Chilean Air Force
- Number built: 1

History
- Introduction date: 1928
- First flight: 1927
- Retired: 1929

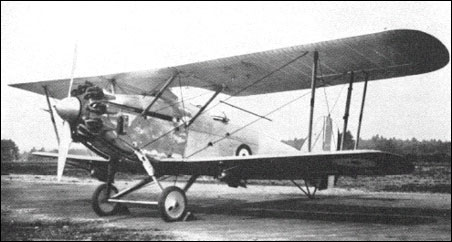

The Vickers Type 131 Valiant was a British general-purpose biplane produced by Vickers in 1927, with the intention of replacing the Royal Air Force's Airco DH.9As, but was unsuccessful, with only a single example built, which was sold to Chile.

== Development and design ==
In 1926, based on experience with the wooden-winged Vickers Vixen biplane, where the wings proved vulnerable to extremes of temperature and humidity, designed a set of metal wings for the Vixen, with which it became the Vickers Vivid, and in parallel, designed an all-metal general purpose biplane, the Vickers Type 131, hoping to replace the DH.9A in that role. In 1927, the British Air Ministry issued Specification 26/27 for a DH.9A replacement which, to save money, had to use as many components of the DH.9A as possible because the RAF held large stocks of DH.9A spares. Vickers submitted the Type 131 design to the Ministry but, as it did not make use of the required DH9A components, did not receive a contract for a prototype. However Vickers decided to build a single prototype as a private venture for evaluation against the specification.

The Vickers 131 Valiant was a single-bay biplane of all-metal construction, sharing much of the structure with the Vivid. It was powered by a 492 hp (367 kW) Bristol Jupiter engine, and the crew of two sat in separate but adjacent cockpits, giving good communication between the pilot and observer. It could carry up to 500 lb (230 kg) of bombs under the wing, with a fixed Vickers machine gun for the pilot and a Lewis gun on a Scarff ring for the observer.

The prototype had made its first flight by 5 March 1927, and underwent official evaluation against the designs from Bristol (the Beaver), Fairey (the Fairey Ferret and IIIF), Gloster (the Goral) and Westland (the Wapiti). Its initial tests showed it to possess good handling, and was taken forwards for squadron trials, along with the Ferret, IIIF and Wapiti. Following these trials, the Wapiti was chosen as the winner, with the Valiant, which was 30% more expensive than the Wapiti, rejected because it was a poor bombing platform, not being sufficiently stable.

== Operational history ==
The Valiant was shipped to Chile in 1928 for demonstration to the Chilean Air Force that wanted a replacement for their Vixens. While no production followed, Chile purchased the prototype, which entered service with the School of Aviation, being destroyed in a crash on 29 March 1929.

== Operators ==
Chile

- Chilean Air Force

== Specifications (Type 131 Valiant) ==
Data from Limited Editions Part 7:Vickers Valiant biplane

General characteristics

- Crew: Two (pilot and observer/gunner)
- Length: 33 ft 5 1/2 in (10.20 m)
- Wingspan: 45 ft 5 in (13.84 m)
- Height: 11 ft 7 1/2 in (3.54 m) (tail down)
- Wing area: 597 sq ft (55.5 m^{2})
- Empty weight: 3,048 lb (1,383 kg)
- Gross weight: 4,519 lb (2,050 kg)
- Powerplant: 1 × Bristol Jupiter VI 9-cylinder radial engine, 492 hp (367 kW)
- Propellers: 2-bladed Vickers wooden fixed-pitch propeller, 9 ft 6 in (2.90 m) diameter

Performance

- Maximum speed: 130 mph (210 km/h, 110 kn) at sea level
- Service ceiling: 19,650 ft (5,990 m)
- Rate of climb: 940 ft/min (4.8 m/s)

Armament

- Guns: 2× 0.303 (7.7 mm) machine guns
- Bombs: 500 lb (227 kg) of bombs

== See also ==
Related development

- Vickers Vixen
- Vickers Vivid

Related lists

- List of bomber aircraft
