= Peugeot Type 54 =

Overview
- Manufacturer: S. A. des Automobiles Peugeot
- Production: 1903; 250 produced

Body and chassis
- Body style: Runabout
- Layout: FR layout

Powertrain
- Engine: 652 cc V-twin

Chronology
- Predecessor: Peugeot Type 37
- Successor: Peugeot Bébé

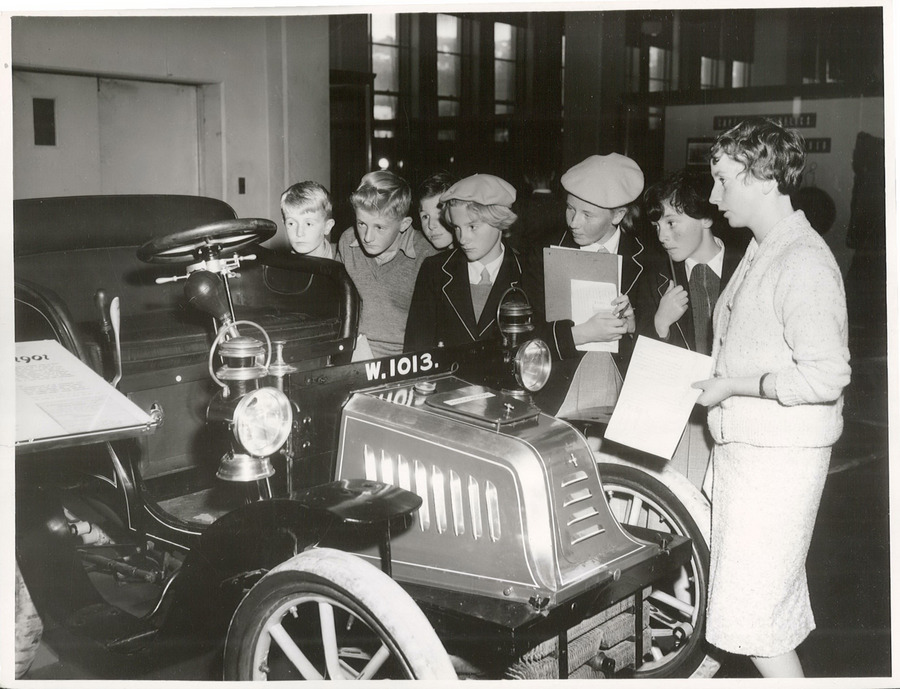
M.O. Conner (right) giving a talk on a 1902 "Peugeot" car which is on display at the Dominion Museum, Wellington.

The Peugeot Type 54 was an all-new model made in 1903. Producing 250 units in less than a year, it was Peugeot's first considerable production effort. Front-engine design with rear-wheel drive, made possible by a driveshaft, was in its second year of use at Peugeot. The National Museum of New Zealand; Te Papa, has a "Type 54" on static display.

With a new 652 cc engine, 5 bhp (3.7 kW) was available. The Type 54 was a lightweight, compact runabout that seated two, which meant a maximum speed of 40 kilometres per hour (25 mph).
