= Bristol Pullman =

Pullman
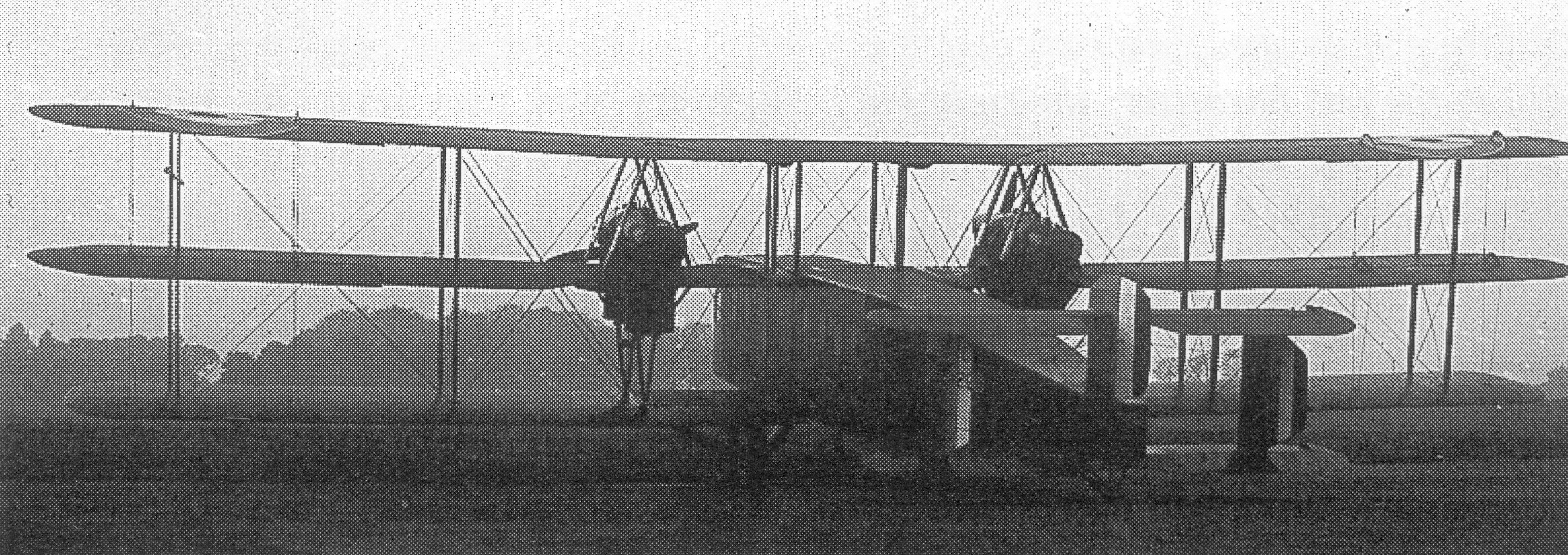

General information
- Type: Passenger aircraft
- National origin: United Kingdom
- Manufacturer: Bristol Aeroplane Company
- Designer: Frank Barnwell
- Status: Prototype
- Primary user: Royal Air Force
- Number built: 1

History
- First flight: May 1920
- Developed from: Bristol Braemar
- Developed into: Bristol Tramp

The Bristol Pullman was a British prototype passenger aircraft developed from the Braemar triplane heavy bomber.

== Design and development ==
The Pullman was developed as a 14-passenger variant of the Braemar bomber. The third prototype Braemar was completed as the prototype and sole Pullman and first flew early in May 1920. It was shown at the International Aero Show at Olympia in July of that year, where its great size and interior fittings were much admired. The Pullman was one of the earliest British aircraft to have a fully enclosed crew cabin, and this feature was disliked by service pilots, who often carried fireman's axes with them to enable them to escape in an emergency.

== Operational history ==
Ultimately the Pullman was not accepted for squadron use by the Royal Air Force, nor was it selected for use by any civil operator. The prototype was the sole example of the type constructed or configured.

== Variants ==
Type 26 Pullman
Passenger variant of the Braemar bomber powered by four Liberty L-12 engines, one built and first flown in May 1920, sometimes known as the Pullman 14.
Type 33 Pullman 40
Proposed upscaled 40-passenger variant, it was to be powered from a central engine room, at first with four 500 hp (373 kW) Siddeley Tiger engines and later by two 1,500 hp (1,119 kW) steam turbines. A smaller testbed for the central engine room concept was built as the Tramp.

== Operators ==
United Kingdom

- Royal Air Force

== Specifications ==
Data from Bristol Aircraft since 1910

General characteristics

- Crew: 2
- Capacity: 14 passengers
- Length: 52 ft (16 m)
- Wingspan: 81 ft 8 in (24.89 m)
- Height: 20 ft (6.1 m)
- Wing area: 1,905 sq ft (177.0 m^{2})
- Empty weight: 11,000 lb (4,990 kg)
- Gross weight: 17,750 lb (8,051 kg)
- Powerplant: 4 × Liberty L-12 V-12 water-cooled piston engines, 400 hp (300 kW) each
- Propellers: 4-bladed fixed-pitch pusher and tractor propellers

Performance

- Maximum speed: 135 mph (217 km/h, 117 kn)
- Range: 1,000 mi (1,600 km, 870 nmi) +
- Service ceiling: 15,000 ft (4,600 m)

== See also ==
Related development

- Bristol Braemar
- Bristol Tramp
