= Vickers Valparaiso =

Valparaiso
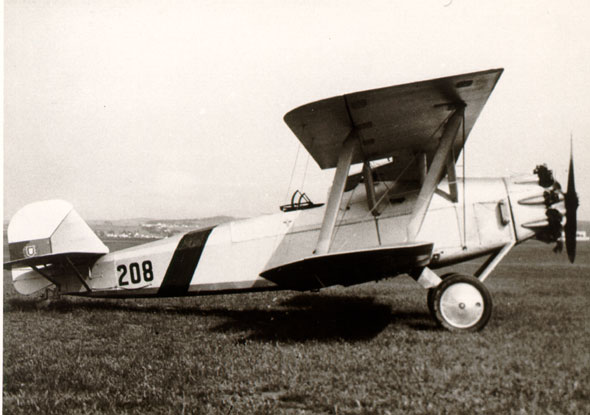
- Vickers Valparaiso III in Portuguese service.

General information
- Type: Light bomber
- Manufacturer: Vickers
- Primary users: Portugal Chile
- Number built: 28

History
- First flight: 1923
- Retired: 1936
- Developed from: Vickers Vixen

The Vickers Valparaiso was a British light bomber biplane of the 1920s. It was designed by Vickers as a development of its Vixen for export, being sold to Portugal and Chile.

== Development and design ==
The Vickers Valparaiso was a derivative of the Vixen I for export purposes. It was renamed Valparaiso to distinguish it from the Vixen, which as it used classified government equipment, was unavailable for export. Two versions were available, one powered by the same Napier Lion as the Vixen, known as the Type 93 Valparaiso I, while the Type 92 Valparaiso II was powered by the Rolls-Royce Eagle engine Other than their engines, the Valparaisos were very similar to the Vixen I, both being single-bay biplanes with wooden wings and steel tube fuselages. Both versions were purchased by Portugal, which ordered ten Valparaiso Is and four Valparaiso IIs, with the Lion-powered aircraft to serve as reconnaissance bombers and the lower powered Valparaiso IIs to serve as advanced trainers. In 1928, Portugal decided to license-produce a modified Valparaiso powered by a Gnome et Rhône Jupiter radial engine, and a single Valparaiso was modified by Vickers to use the Jupiter, followed by the production of 13 aircraft, designated Type 168 Valparaiso III by OGMA (Oficinas Gerais de Material Aeronáutico).

== Operational history ==
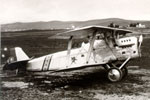
Vickers Valparaiso I in Portuguese service.

The Portuguese aircraft proved to be successful in service, with two carrying out a long distance tour from Portugal to its African colonies of Angola and Mozambique and back in 1928, with the success of the aircraft resulting in the decision to license-produce the Valparaiso III. The radial-powered Valparaisos also proved successful in Portuguese service, remaining operational until 1943, finally being replaced by Westland Lysanders.

A single Valparaiso I (actually the prototype), was sold by Vickers to Chile in 1924. It was successful in Chilean service, resulting in an order for a further 18 modified aircraft, which reverted to the original name of Vixen, as the Vixen V.

== Variants ==
Type 93 Valparaiso I
Napier Lion-powered export version of Vickers Vixen. 11 built.
Type 92 Valparaiso II
Rolls-Royce Eagle-powered version. Four built.
Type 168 Valparaiso III
Version powered by Jupiter radial for Portugal. 13 license-built by OGMA.

== Operators ==
Chile

- Chilean Air Force

Portugal

- Aeronáutica Militar (Portuguese Army Aviation)

== Specifications (Valparaiso I) ==
Data from Vickers Aircraft Since 1908

General characteristics

- Crew: 2
- Length: 29 ft 0 in (8.84 m)
- Upper wingspan: 40 ft 0 in (12.19 m)
- Lower wingspan: 34 ft 6 in (10.52 m)
- Height: 11 ft 8 in (3.56 m)
- Wing area: 526 sq ft (48.9 m^{2})
- Empty weight: 3,128 lb (1,419 kg)
- Gross weight: 4,720 lb (2,141 kg)
- Powerplant: 1 × Napier Lion 12-cylinder water-cooled W-block, 468 hp (349 kW)

Performance

- Maximum speed: 136 mph (219 km/h, 118 kn) at 10,000 ft (3,000 m)
- Cruise speed: 110 mph (177 km/h, 96 kn)
- Range: 550 mi (890 km, 480 nmi) at 10,000 ft (3,000 m) and 110 mph (96 kn; 180 km/h)
- Service ceiling: 19,500 ft (5,900 m)
- Time to altitude: 10 min 15 s to 10,000 ft (3,000 m)

Armament

- Guns:
  - 2 × forward-firing .303 in (7.7 mm) Vickers machine gun
  - 1 × .303 in (7.7 mm) Lewis Gun in observers cockpit

== See also ==
Related development

- Vickers Vixen
- Vickers Venture
