= Gloster III =

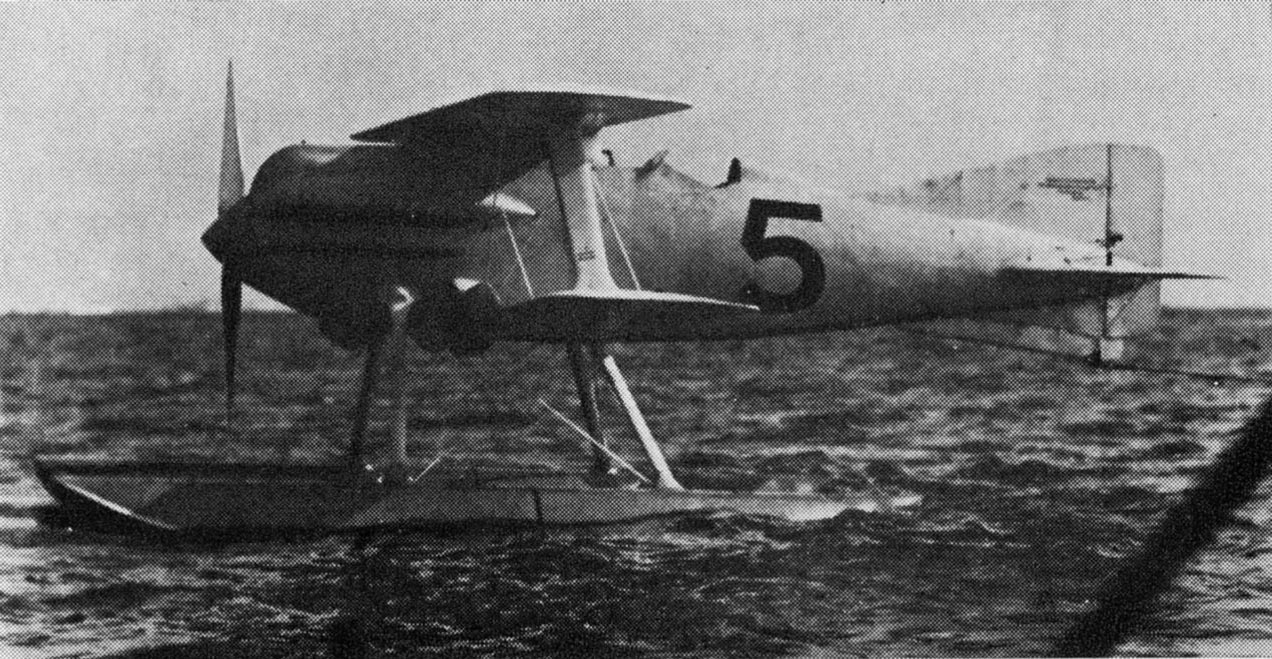
- Gloster IIIA at 1925 Schneider Trophy

General information
- Type: Racing seaplane
- National origin: United Kingdom
- Manufacturer: Gloster Aircraft Company
- Designer: Henry Folland
- Primary user: Royal Air Force
- Number built: 2

History
- First flight: 29 August 1925

The Gloster III was a British racing floatplane of the 1920s intended to compete for the Schneider Trophy air race. A single-engined, single-seat biplane, two were built, with one finishing second in the 1925 race.

== Design and development ==
In 1924, the Gloster Aircraft Company designed and built the Gloster II, a development of the Gloster I racing aircraft to compete in that year's Schneider Trophy air race. The first aircraft was written off during trials, however, and as there were no other competitors, the American Aero Club postponed the competition to 1925.

In order to compete in the 1925 race, the British Air Ministry placed an order with Gloster for the design and build of two examples of a new racing seaplane in February 1925.^{[a]} The resulting design, the Gloster III, like the Gloster II, was a wooden biplane with single bay wings, powered by a 700 hp (522 kW) Napier Lion VII engine. The aircraft was fitted with Lamblin radiators on the leading edge of the lower wings. With a 20 ft (6.1 m) wingspan, the Gloster was the smallest British aircraft ever built with that power at that time.

The first prototype, with the serial number N194 was flown by Hubert Broad on 29 August 1925, with the second aircraft (with the civil registration G-EBLJ and the military serial N195) being flown a few days later by Bert Hinkler.

== Operational history ==
The pilots had little time to practice flying the Gloster IIIs, with N194 only flying four times and N195 flying once before departing for America. When the Supermarine S.4 crashed during navigation trials on 23 October 1925, N195, which was brought as a reserve was prepared to take part in the race instead of the Supermarine monoplane, to be flown by Hinkler. On the morning of the race, however, N195 was damaged during taxiing tests, leaving Broad in N194 to carry British hopes in the afternoon's race.

When the race took place, the Gloster III was outclassed by the Curtiss R3Cs of the United States, with the race being won by Lieutenant James Doolittle, flying a Curtiss R3C at an average speed of 232.573 mph (374.443 km/h), 33 mph (53 km/h) faster than Broad, who recorded a speed of 199.091 mph (320.537 km/h), with De Briganti in the Macchi M.33 finishing third and the remaining two Curtiss R3Cs failing to finish.

Following the race, the two Gloster IIIs were returned to the United Kingdom. After modification, they were used for training pilots of the RAFs High Speed Flight in preparation for the 1927 race.

== Variants ==
Gloster III
Original variant, powered by 700 hp (522 kW) Napier Lion. Two built.
Gloster IIIA
Modified tail to resolve stability problems encountered on first flight.
Gloster IIIB
Modification of N195 following return of aircraft from 1925 Schneider Trophy. Low drag surface radiators fitted to all four wings and modified cantilevered tail. Maximum speed increased to 252 mph (406 km/h).

== Operators ==
United Kingdom

- Royal Air Force
  - High Speed Flight RAF

== Specifications (Gloster IIIA) ==
Data from Gloster Aircraft since 1917

General characteristics

- Crew: 1
- Length: 26 ft 10 in (8.18 m)
- Wingspan: 20 ft 0 in (6.10 m)
- Height: 9 ft 8 in (2.95 m)
- Wing area: 152 sq ft (14.1 m^{2})
- Empty weight: 2,028 lb (920 kg)
- Gross weight: 2,687 lb (1,219 kg)
- Powerplant: 1 × Napier Lion VII W-12 liquid-cooled piston engine, 700 hp (520 kW)
- Propellers: 2-bladed Gloster fixed-pitch propeller

Performance

- Maximum speed: 225 mph (362 km/h, 196 kn)
- Wing loading: 17.7 lb/sq ft (86 kg/m^{2})
- Power/mass: 0.26 hp/lb (0.43 kW/kg)

== See also ==
- Schneider Trophy

Related development

- Gloster II
- Gloster IV

Aircraft of comparable role, configuration, and era

- Supermarine S.4
- Curtiss R3C
