= Peugeot Type 37 =

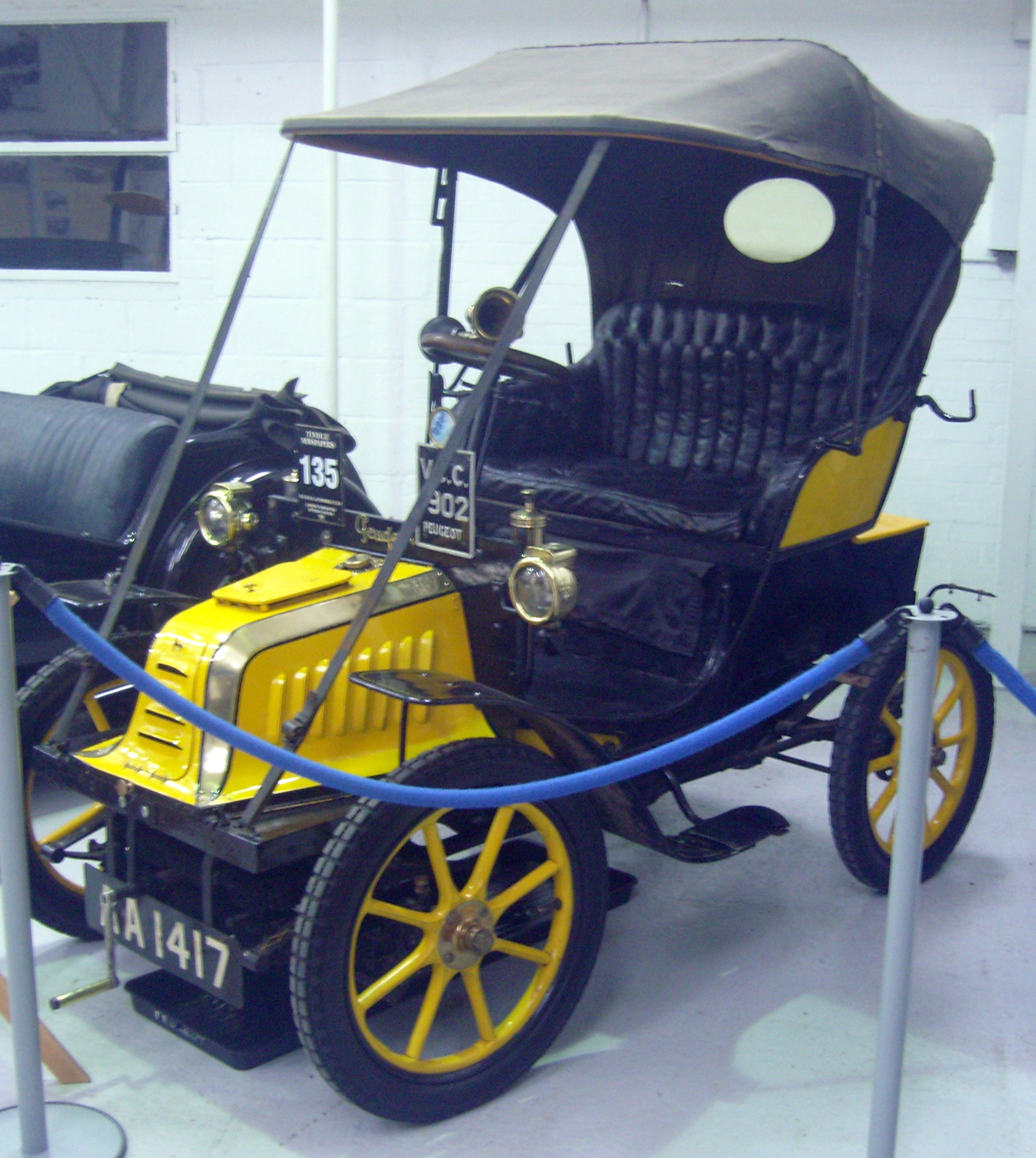

Overview
- Manufacturer: Peugeot
- Production: 1902

Body and chassis
- Class: small car
- Layout: FR layout

Dimensions
- Wheelbase: 1,400 mm (55.1 in)
- Length: 2,450 mm (96.5 in)

Chronology
- Successor: Peugeot Type 54

The Peugeot Type 37 is an early motor vehicle produced in 1902 by the French auto-maker Peugeot at their Audincourt plant. 100 were produced.

The vehicle was powered by a single cylinder four stroke engine. On earlier small Peugeots power had been delivered to the driving wheels via a chain-drive mechanism, but for the Type 37 Peugeot did away with this approach. The engine was now mounted ahead of the driver, and power was delivered to the rear wheels via a rotating steel drive-shaft. The 652 cc engine, located ahead of the driver, produced 5 hp (4 kW). A top speed of 40 km/h (25 mph) was claimed.

The Type 37 had a 1,400 mm (55.1 in) wheel base. The “Voiturette” format cabriolet body was 2,450 mm (96.5 in) long and provided space for two.

The car was replaced in 1903 by the Peugeot Type 54 which also featured a two-person “Voiturette” format cabriolet body, and was broadly similar in mechanical terms but, at 2,200 mm (86.6 in), even shorter.

== Sources and further reading ==
- Wolfgang Schmarbeck: Alle Peugeot Automobile 1890-1990. Motorbuch-Verlag. Stuttgart 1990. ISBN 3-613-01351-7
