= Bristol Braemar =

Bristol Types 24 and 25 Braemar
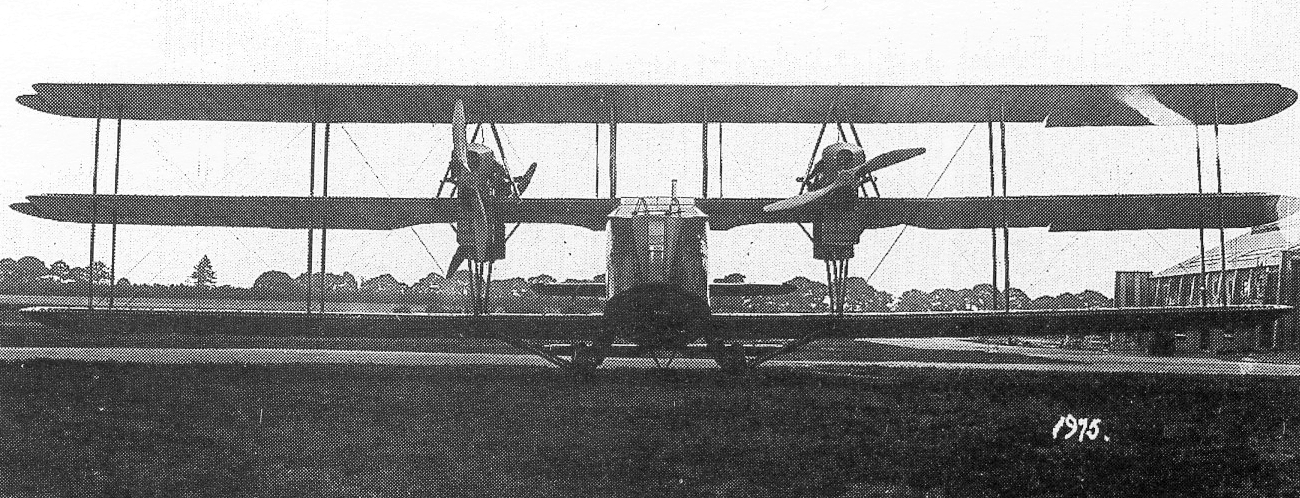
- Braemar second prototype, 1919

General information
- Type: Heavy bomber
- National origin: United Kingdom
- Manufacturer: Bristol Aeroplane Company
- Designer: Frank Barnwell
- Number built: 2

History
- First flight: 13 August 1918
- Developed into: Bristol Pullman

The Bristol Braemar was a British heavy bomber aircraft developed at the end of the First World War for the Royal Air Force. Only two prototypes were constructed.

== Development ==
The prototype Braemar was developed in response to the establishment of the Independent Air Force in October 1917, as a bomber capable of the long-range bombing of Berlin if necessary. A large triplane, it had internal stowage for up to six 250 lb (110 kg) bombs.

The initial design featured an unusual engine installation with a central engine room housing all four engines. These were to be geared in pairs and power taken from the engines to the four propellers by power shafts. This design was abandoned early in development, and both the completed Braemars had a conventional engine installation, with the engines in inline tandem pairs, driving pusher and tractor propellers. However, the engine-room design was resurrected later in the Braemar's development life, for the proposed steam-powered Tramp.

A contract from the Air Board for three prototypes was awarded to Bristol & Colonial on 26 February 1918. The first prototype Braemar flew on 13 August 1918, with four 230 hp (170 kW) Siddeley Puma engines. The prototype showed generally good performance with a top speed of 106 mph (171 km/h), but there were complaints from the test pilots about the view from the cockpit and the controls, and so the next aircraft produced was an improved version designated Braemar Mk.II. The Mk.II received considerably more power from its four 400 hp (300 kW) Liberty L-12 engines, which gave it an improved speed of 125 mph (201 km/h).

The Braemar never entered service with the RAF, and the two prototypes were the only Braemars built. The third prototype was completed as a Pullman 14-passenger civil transport.

== Variants ==
The Bristol Braemar II photographed in flight, 1919.

Type 24 Braemar I
Prototype with four 230 hp (172 kW) Siddeley Puma engines, one built first flown 13 March 1918.
Type 25 Braemar II
Prototype with four 400 hp (298 kW) Liberty L-12 engines, one built first flown 18 February 1919.
Type 26 Pullman
14-passenger civil transport variant with Liberty L-12 engines, one built first flown in May 1920.

== Specifications (Braemar Mk.II) ==
Data from Bristol Aircraft since 1910

General characteristics

- Crew: 6 - 2 pilots, wireless operator, engineer and two gunners
- Length: 51 ft 6 in (15.70 m)
- Wingspan: 81 ft 8 in (24.89 m)
- Height: 20 ft (6.1 m)
- Wing area: 1,905 sq ft (177.0 m^{2})
- Empty weight: 10,650 lb (4,831 kg)
- Gross weight: 16,500 lb (7,484 kg)
- Powerplant: 4 × Liberty L-12 V-12 water-cooled piston engines, 400 hp (300 kW) each in two tandem nacelles mounted on the mid wing
- Propellers: 2-bladed fixed-pitch pusher and tractor propellers

Performance

- Maximum speed: 106 mph (171 km/h, 92 kn)
- Range: 1,000 mi (1,600 km, 870 nmi) +
- Service ceiling: 17,000 ft (5,200 m)
- Wing loading: 9.45 lb/sq ft (46.1 kg/m^{2})
- Power/mass: 0.08 hp/lb (0.13 kW/kg)

Armament

- Guns: 2 × 0.303 in (7.7 mm) machine guns
- Bombs: 1,500 lb (680 kg)

== See also ==
Related development

- Bristol Pullman
- Bristol Tramp

Aircraft of comparable role, configuration, and era

- Vickers Vimy
- Handley Page V/1500

Related lists

- List of bomber aircraft
