= De Havilland DH.65 Hound =

DH.65 Hound
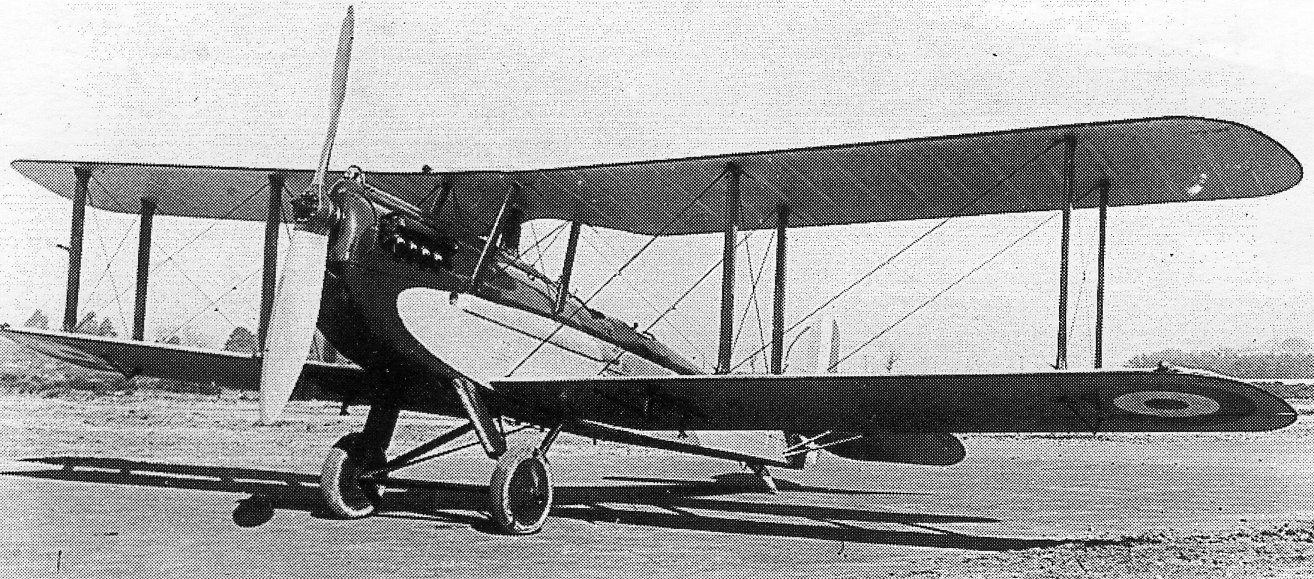
- The modified DH.65A

General information
- Type: Day Bomber
- Manufacturer: de Havilland
- Primary user: Royal Air Force
- Number built: 1

History
- Introduction date: 1928
- First flight: 17 November 1926

The de Havilland DH.65 Hound was a 1920s British two-seat day bomber built by de Havilland at Stag Lane Aerodrome.

== History ==
The Hound was designed as a two-seat general purpose biplane, a private venture to meet Air Ministry Specification 12/26. The prototype G-EBNJ first flew on 17 November 1926. It was of all-wooden construction, powered by a Napier Lion engine. In 1927, the nose and rudder were modified, it was fitted with a geared engine and received the modified designation DH.65A. It was delivered to the Royal Air Force in January 1928 receiving serial number J9127 for evaluation. While it showed superior performance to the other competitors for the specification, it was rejected because of its wooden construction and the order was placed with the Hawker Hart.

Despite its rejection by the RAF, on 26 April 1928 the aircraft set a world record for carrying a load of 2,205 lb (1,000 kg) over 62 mi (100 km) at 160 mph (257 km/h) piloted by H.S. Broad.

A project to further develop the Hound as a four-seat passenger transport under the designation DH.74 was left unrealised.

The design being otherwise unsuccessful, the second aircraft G-EBNK was not completed.

== Operators ==
United Kingdom

- Royal Air Force

== Specifications (DH.65A) ==
Data from British Civil Aircraft since 1919 Volume 2

General characteristics

- Crew: 2
- Length: 31 ft 0 in (9.45 m)
- Wingspan: 45 ft 0 in (13.72 m)
- Height: 11 ft 6 in (3.51 m)
- Wing area: 462 sq ft (42.9 m^{2})
- Empty weight: 2,981 lb (1,352 kg)
- Gross weight: 4,934 lb (2,238 kg)
- Powerplant: 1 × Napier Lion XI W-12 water-cooled piston engine, 550 hp (410 kW)
- Propellers: 2-bladed fixed-pitch propeller

Performance

- Maximum speed: 153 mph (246 km/h, 133 kn)
- Range: 1,000 mi (1,600 km, 870 nmi)
- Service ceiling: 25,500 ft (7,800 m)
- Rate of climb: 1,490 ft/min (7.6 m/s)

Armament

- Guns: Provision for 1 × forward firing .303 in (7.7 mm) Vickers machine gun and 1 × .303 in (7.7 mm) Lewis gun on Scarff ring in rear cockpit
- Bombs: Provision for up to 2 × 230 lb (104 kg) bombs carried under wings

== See also ==
Related lists

- List of aircraft of the Royal Air Force
