= Bristol Tramp =

Type 37 Tramp Type 44 Tramp Boat
- Type 37

General information
- Type: Passenger aircraft
- National origin: United Kingdom
- Manufacturer: Bristol Aeroplane Company
- Designer: Frank Barnwell
- Number built: 2

History
- Developed from: Bristol Pullman

The Bristol Tramp was a British steam-powered passenger and airmail transport aircraft designed by the Bristol Aeroplane Company. It was built but never flew.

== Development ==
The Tramp was a development of Bristol's earlier Pullman passenger aircraft. In 1919, Frank Barnwell entered discussions with the Royal Mail Steam Packet Company about the feasibility of using flying boats as auxiliaries to ocean liners. The Royal Mail Steam Packet Company had very limited experience with internal combustion engines, but long-term and deep knowledge of steam turbine powerplants, and so suggested the use of a steam turbine to power the aircraft. As Bristol's heavy bomber, the Braemar – the progenitor of the Pullman – had originally been designed to have a central engine room with driveshafts to wing-mounted propellers, the Pullman seemed a suitable candidate as a testbed for the installation of a steam turbine engine room.

The powerplant was to consist of two 1,500 hp (1,120 kW) steam turbines of the Ljungstrøm type, with closed-circuit high-pressure flash boilers. The unprecedented 3,000 hp (2,240 kW) would be delivered though driveshafts and clutches to four-bladed tractor propellers mounted on each middle wing (the Braemar/Pullman/Tramp family were triplanes). In the end, the only problem encountered with the steam turbine itself was that it delivered far too much power for the Tramp airframe, which had been designed to handle the 1,600 hp (1,190 kW) of four 400 hp (300 kW) Liberty L-12 engines. The main problem turned out to be designing a reliable lightweight closed-circuit boiler and condenser.

Two examples of the Tramp were completed in 1921, powered by four 230 hp (170 kW) Siddeley Puma piston engines, but the power transmission system, particularly the clutches, gave continual trouble, and neither ever flew. They were moved to Farnborough in 1922 where they were used as ground test rigs for several years.

The Tramp Boat was a proposed flying boat development of the Tramp.

== Variants ==
Type 37 Tramp
Experimental steam-powered triplanes, originally described as spares carriers with four 230 hp (172 kW) Siddeley Puma engines in a central engine room. Two built but never flown.
Type 44 Tramp Boat
Proposed triplane flying-boat variant.

== Specifications (Tramp with Puma engines) ==
Data from Bristol Aircraft since 1910

General characteristics

- Crew: 3
- Length: 60 ft (18 m)
- Wingspan: 96 ft (29 m)
- Height: 20 ft (6.1 m)
- Wing area: 2,284 sq ft (212.2 m^{2})
- Empty weight: 12,809 lb (5,810 kg)
- Gross weight: 18,795 lb (8,525 kg)
- Powerplant: 4 × Siddeley Puma 6-cylinder water-cooled in-line piston engines, 230 hp (170 kW) each

In lieu of the 1,500 hp (1,119 kW) Lungstrøm steam turbine

- Propellers: 2-bladed fixed-pitch pusher and tractor propellers

== See also ==
Related development

- Bristol Braemar
- Bristol Pullman
