= Napier Lion =

British piston aircraft engine family

Lion
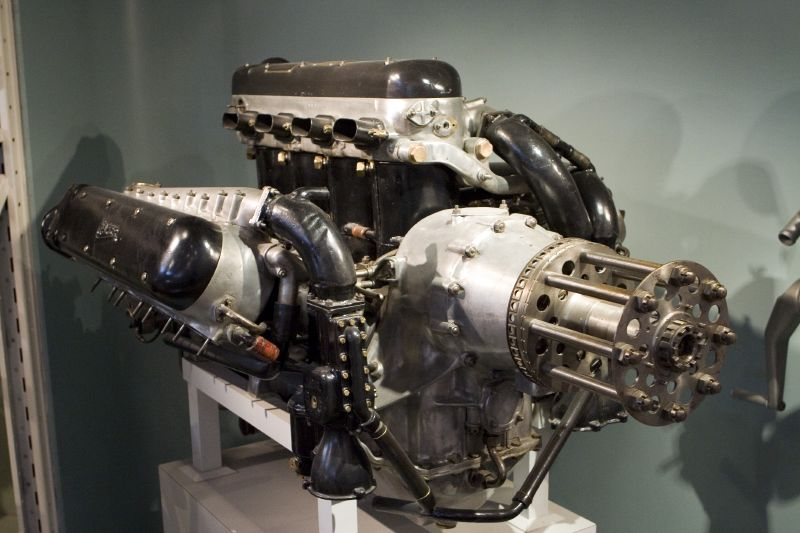
- Napier Lion II at Canada Aviation Museum
- Type: Piston aero-engine
- Manufacturer: D. Napier & Son
- First run: 1917
- Major applications: Handley Page Hyderabad; Vickers Vernon

The Napier Lion is a 12-cylinder, petrol-fueled 'broad arrow' W12 configuration aircraft engine built by D. Napier & Son from 1917 until the 1930s. A number of advanced features made it the most powerful engine of its day and kept it in production long after other contemporary designs had been superseded. It is known for its use in a number of racing designs, for aircraft, boats and cars.

== Design and development ==
Early in the First World War, Napier were contracted to build aero engines to designs from other companies, initially a Royal Aircraft Factory model and then Sunbeams. Both engines proved to be unreliable and in 1916 Napier decided to design an engine with high power, light weight and low frontal area. Napier's engineers laid out the engine with its 12 cylinders in what they called a "broad arrow"—three banks of four cylinders sharing a common crankshaft. The configuration is also known as a W engine. The engine was also advanced in form, the heads using four valves per cylinder with twin overhead camshafts on each bank of cylinders and a single block being milled from aluminium instead of the common separate-cylinder steel construction used on almost all other designs. In contrast to the long stroke small bore engine designs typical of the period, the Lion engine was also well ahead of its time in being oversquare, the cylinder bore diameter being larger than the crankshaft stroke, this allowing higher engine speeds and greater efficiency.

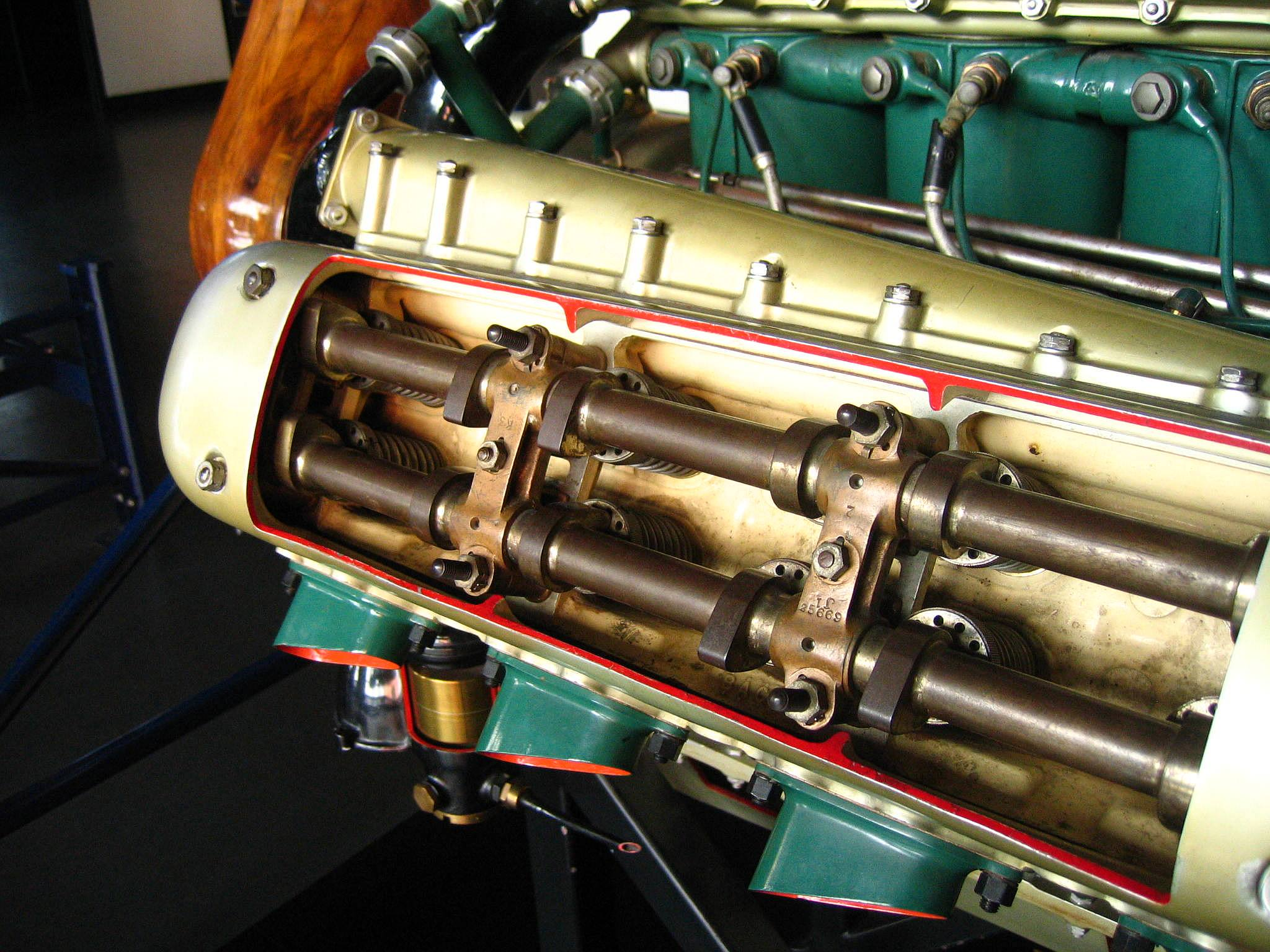
Cutaway view showing the double overhead camshaft arrangement

Under Arthur Rowledge, the design of the engine, renamed Lion, was completed in 1917; hand-built prototypes ran later that year. It was fitted to an Airco DH.9 in early 1918, and many cooling problems were observed during testing. The milled block was difficult to build with the required accuracy and the design reverted to separate aluminium cylinders. Both problems were solved by the middle of the year and the engine entered production in June 1918. The first Lion I versions delivered 450 horsepower (340 kW) from their 24 litres. The power output made the Lion the most powerful Allied aircraft engine, which had previously been the Liberty L-12, producing 400 horsepower (300 kW).

As the most powerful engine available (particularly after a turbocharger became an option in 1922), the Lion went on to commercial success. Through the years between the wars the Lion was ubiquitous and Napier manufactured little else. They stopped making cars in 1925 and little thought was given to replacing their world-famous product. Between the wars the Lion engine powered over 160 different aircraft types.

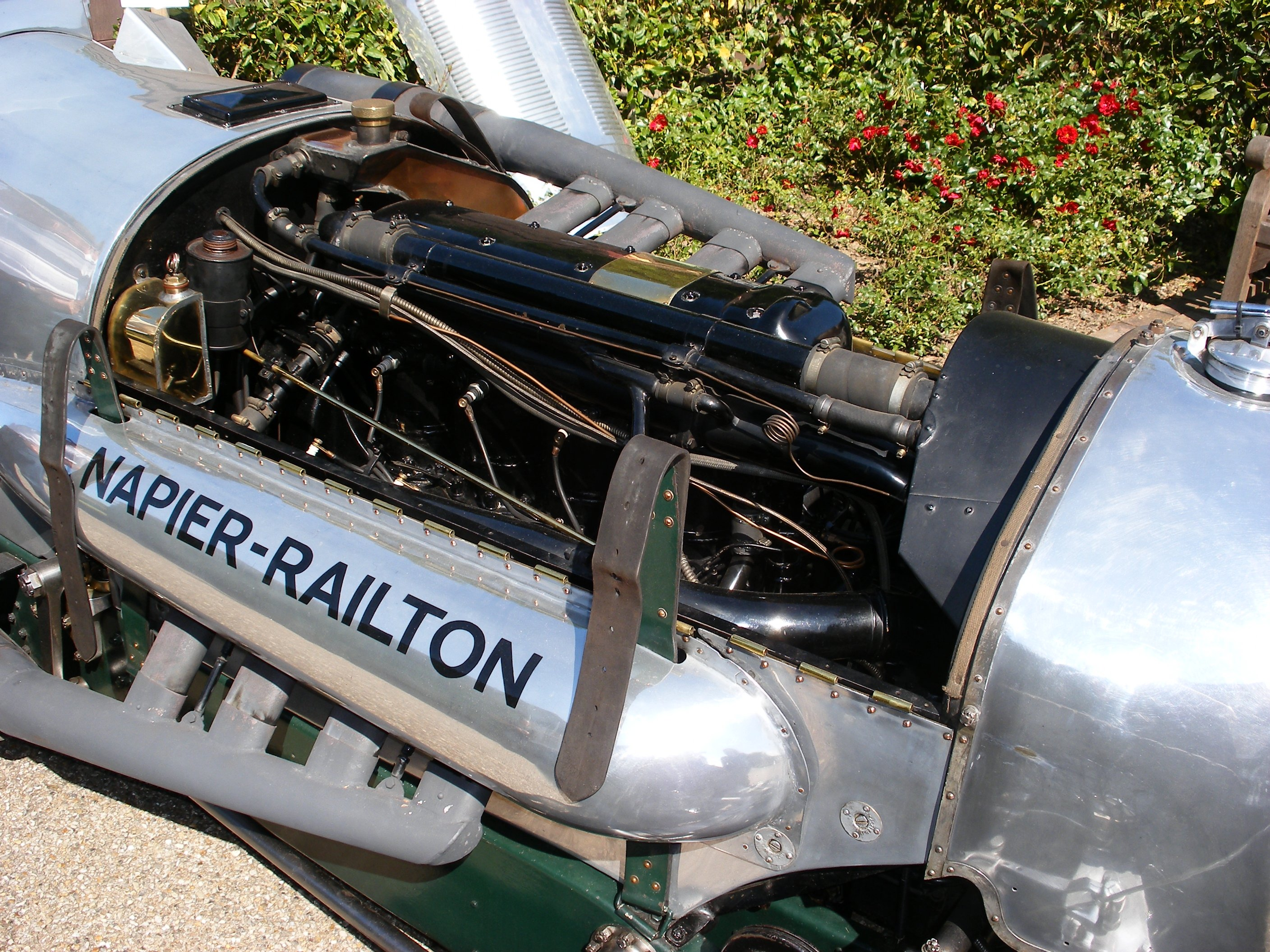
The Napier Lion installed in the Napier-Railton car

In highly tuned racing versions, the engine could reach 1,300 hp (970 kW) and it was used to break many world height, air speed and distance records in aircraft and boats, delivering 1,375 hp (1,025 kW) in a highly tuned Lion for a water speed record of 100 mph (160 km/h) in 1933. In land speed records, Lion engines powered many of Sir Malcolm Campbell's record breakers including a record of over 250 mph (400 km/h) in 1932 and John Cobb's 394 mph (634 km/h) Railton Mobil Special in 1947—a record that came well after the Lion had passed its prime and stood until the 1960s. The record had been held by British drivers for 32 years. Lions powered successful entrants in the most prestigious event in air racing, the Schneider Trophy, in 1922 and 1927 but were dropped by Supermarine in favour of a new engine, the Rolls-Royce R, which had been designed for racing.

During the 1930s a new generation of much larger and more powerful engines appeared and the Lion became uncompetitive. By the time the Bristol Hercules and the Rolls-Royce Merlin arrived in the late 1930s, the Lion was obsolete. The Sea Lion, a marine version of the Lion, was used to power high speed RAF Rescue Launches. The Lion aero engine was also adapted to power aerosledges, which were used for high-speed transport and SAR duties on sea ice by the Finnish Air Force and Navy.

Turning away from the broad arrow layout, Napier designed new engines using the more compact H engine layout. The 16-cylinder Napier Rapier produced 400 hp (300 kW) and the 24-cylinder Napier Dagger delivered just under 1,000 hp (750 kW). The engines were smaller than contemporary designs from other companies and Napier started afresh with a new sleeve valve design, which evolved into the Napier Sabre.

== Variants ==
Lion models
Model	Date	Works No.	Power	Notes	Notable uses
I	1918		450 bhp (340 kW) at 1,950 rpm	geared, also related IA and 1AY	
II	1919	E64	480 bhp (360 kW) at 2,200 rpm		
III			geared high compression		Vickers Vernon Mk.III
IV			experimental geared		Gloster Gorcock
V			470 bhp (350 kW) at 2,000 rpm 500 bhp (370 kW) at 2,250 rpm	VA had increased CR to 5.8	Mainstay engine of the RAF in the late 1920s, replaced by Lion XI
VS		E79		Turbocharged, intercooled	
VIS	1927			Turbocharged	Gloster Guan
VII	1925		700 bhp (520 kW) (racing)		Gloster III (Schneider Trophy entrant); Supermarine S.4
VIIA	1927	E86	900 bhp (670 kW) (racing)		Golden Arrow; Blue Bird (1927); Miss England I Supermarine S.5; Gloster IV
VIIB	1927		875 bhp (652 kW) (racing)	geared	Supermarine S.5; Gloster IV
VIID	1929	E91	1,350 bhp (1,010 kW) at 3,600 rpm (racing)	Supercharged, about 6–8 built	Blue Bird (1931); Fred H Stewart's Enterprise; Betty Carstairs' Estelle V powerboat Miss Britain III; Gloster VI (Schneider Trophy entrant); Railton Special (John Cobb's land speed record car)
VIII	1927			direct drive	Gloster Gorcock
XIA	1928		580 bhp (430 kW) at 2,585 rpm, 6:1 CR	RAF production model	Napier-Railton
Lioness		E71		Inverted layout, for better visibility. At least some were built turbocharged, for racing.	
Sea Lion	1933		500 and 600 bhp (370 and 450 kW)	Marine version of Lion XI	British Power Boat Company Type Two 63 ft HSL

== Applications ==
=== Aircraft ===
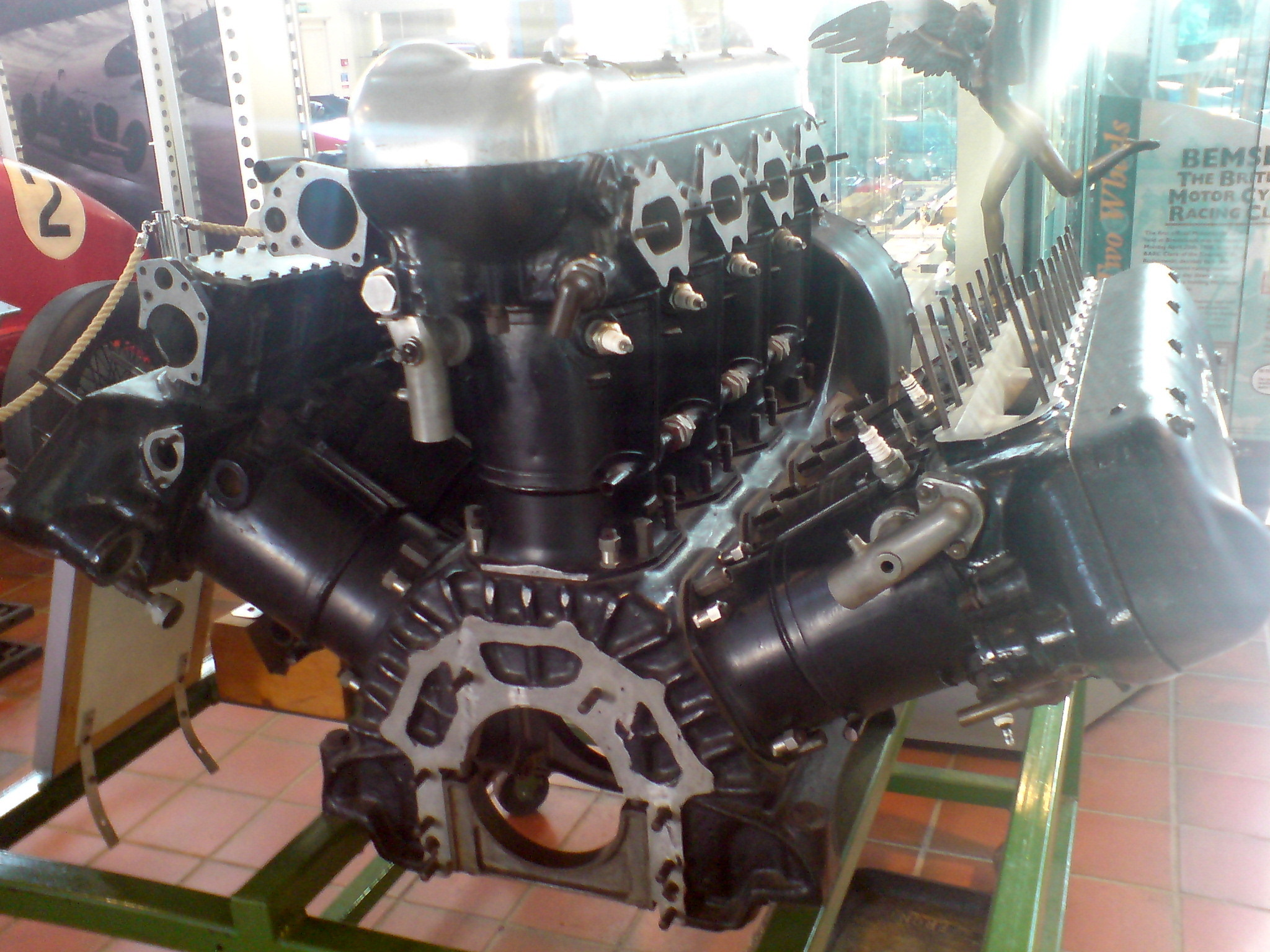
Napier Lion at Brooklands Motor Museum

- Alliance P.2 Seabird
- Avro Bison
- Blackburn Blackburn
- Blackburn Dart
- Blackburn Pellet
- Blackburn Ripon
- Blackburn Velos
- Boulton Paul Atlantic
- Boulton Paul Bodmin
- Boulton Paul Bolton
- Bristol Ten-seater
- English Electric Kingston (prototype)
- Fairey III
- Fairey Fawn
- Felixstowe F.5 – (N4839)
- Fokker C.IV-W
- Fokker C.V
- Fokker D.C.I
- Fokker D.XIII
- Gloster Gorcock
- Gloster Guan
- Handley Page H.P.31 Harrow
- Handley Page Hyderabad
- Handley Page W.10
- Letov Š-8
- Mitsubishi B1M
- Parnall Pike
- Parnall Possum
- Parnall Puffin
- Supermarine S.4
- Supermarine S.5
- Supermarine Seagull
- Supermarine Southampton
- Tarrant Tabor
- Vickers Vernon
- Vickers Valparaiso
- Vickers Victoria
- Vickers Viking
- Vickers Virginia
- Vickers Vixen
- Vickers Vulture
- Westland Walrus

=== Other uses ===
- British Power Boat Company Type Two 63 ft HSL
- British Power Boat Company 60 ft 4 in
- Napier-Railton race car, Brooklands lap record holder
- Napier-Bentley, a 1968 special in the vintage tradition
- Golden Arrow world land speed record holder
- Railton Special world land speed record holder

== Engines on display ==
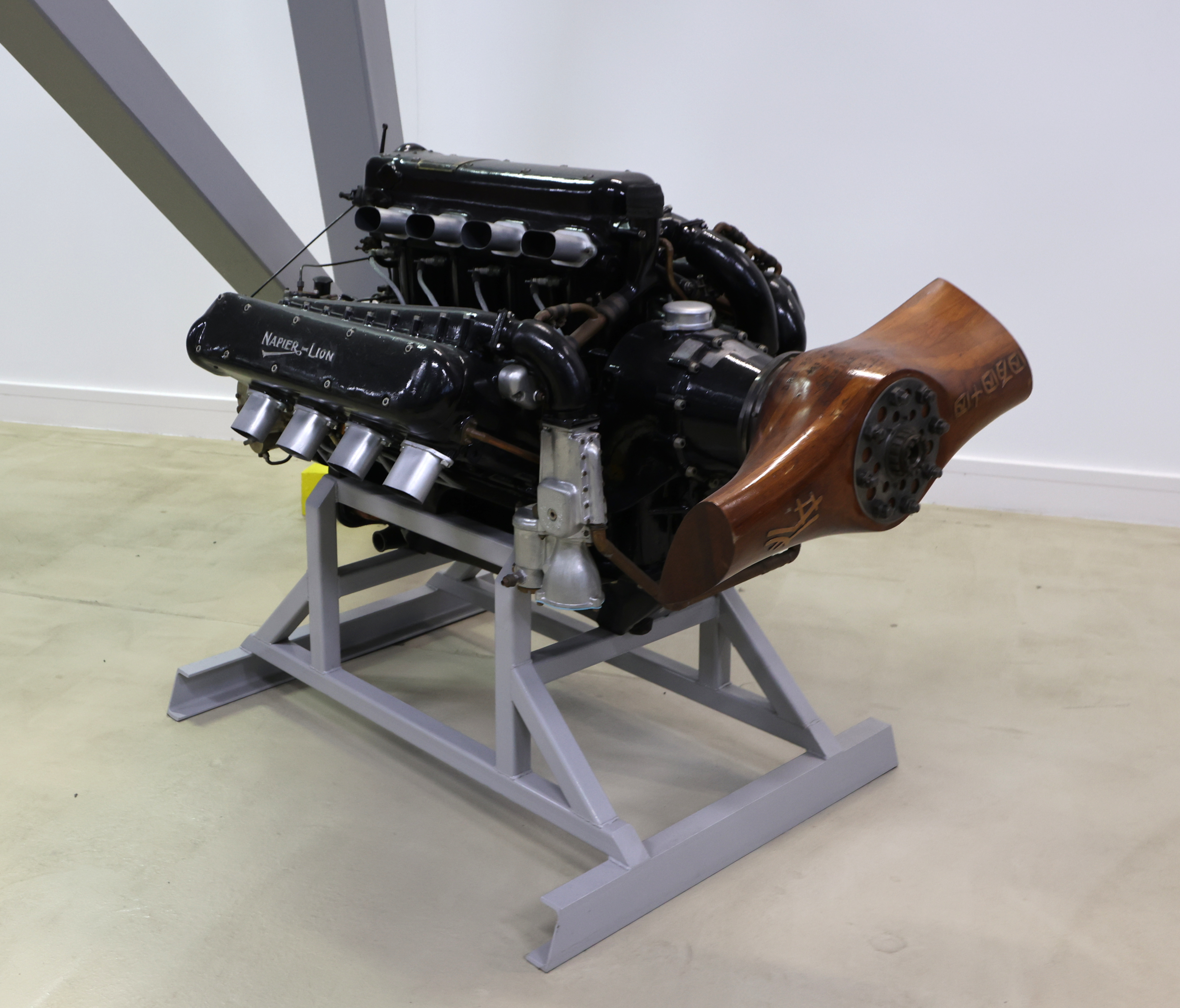
Napier Lion on display at Imperial War Museum Duxford

Preserved Napier Lion engines are on static display at

- Brooklands Museum
- Canada Aviation Museum
- Imperial War Museum Duxford
- National Maritime Museum
- Solent Sky
- Seven F. Udvar-Hazy Center

== Specifications (Lion II) ==
Data from Lumsden

=== General characteristics ===
- Type: 12-cylinder water-cooled W-block 60° (3 banks of 4 cylinders) aircraft piston engine
- Bore: 5.5 in (139.7 mm)
- Stroke: 5.125 in (130.17 mm)
- Displacement: 1,461.6 in^{3} (23.944 L)
- Length: 57.5 in (1460 mm)
- Width: 42.0 in (1067 mm)
- Height: 43.5 in (1105 mm)
- Dry weight: 960 lb (435 kg)

=== Components ===
- Valvetrain: Two intake and two exhaust valves per cylinder actuated via double overhead camshafts per cylinder block.
- Cooling system: Water-cooled

=== Performance ===
- Power output: 480 hp (358 kW) at 2,200 rpm at 5,000 ft
- Specific power: 0.32 hp/in^{3} (15.0 kW/L)
- Compression ratio: 5.8:1
- Power-to-weight ratio: 0.5 hp/lb (0.82 kW/kg)

== See also ==
- Napier-Bentley
- Vehicles powered by Napier Lion engines

Comparable engines

- Farman 12We
- Hispano-Suiza 18R
- Lorraine 12E Courlis

Related lists

- List of aircraft engines
