= Flight 571 =

Flight 571 may refer to:

- Uruguayan Air Force Flight 571, crashed on 13 October 1972 in South America; subsequent events known as Miracle of the Andes
- Sabena Flight 571, hijacked on 8 May 1972 in Europe; ended by a commando raid in Tel Aviv

== See also ==
- Avro 571 Buffalo, a British carrier-based torpedo bomber biplane
- No. 571 Squadron RAF, a British squadron of World War II
