= 812 Naval Air Squadron =

Inactive flying squadron of the Royal Navy's Fleet Air Arm

- Squadron Badge
- Active: Royal Air Force; 1933–1939; Royal Navy: 1939–1942; 1944–1946; 1946–1953; 1955–1956
- Disbanded: 13 December 1956
- Country: United Kingdom
- Branch: Royal Navy
- Type: Torpedo Bomber Reconnaissance squadron
- Role: Carrier-based: anti-submarine warfare (ASW); anti-surface warfare (ASuW)
- Size: twelve / eighteen aircraft
- Part of: Fleet Air Arm
- Mottos: Dex aie (Norman : "God aid us")
- Aircraft: See Aircraft flown section for full list.
- Engagements: World War II; Korean War
- Battle honours: North Sea 1940; English Channel 1940; Mediterranean 1941; Malta Convoys 1941; Korea 1951–52

Insignia
- Squadron Badge Description: Blue, above water wavy green a flying fish gold (1937)
- Identification Markings: 60-65, 70–77 (Ripon/Baffin/Swordfish); G3A+ (Swordfish from May 1939); 3A+ (Swordfish by October 1940); 2A+ (Swordfish in 1942); N1A+ (Barracuda); 370–381 (Barracuda October 1945); V4A+ (Firefly); 270–281 (Firefly March 1946); 287–298 (Firefly from October 1946); 200–211 (Firefly February 1948); 212–215 (Black Flight); 440–447 (Gannet); 255, 260–267 (Gannet January 1956)
- Fin Carrier/Shore Codes: A (Barracuda October 1945); M:N (Firefly March 1946); T (Firefly from October 1946); O:R (Firefly February 1948); R (Black Flight); J (Gannet); J:GN (Gannet January 1956)

812 Naval Air Squadron (812 NAS), also referred to as 812 Squadron, is an inactive Fleet Air Arm (FAA) naval air squadron of the United Kingdom's Royal Navy (RN). It most recently operated the Fairey Gannet AS.1 anti-submarine warfare aircraft between November 1955 and December 1956, with its last deployment aboard the Audacious-class aircraft carrier HMS Eagle, to the Mediterranean.

It was active from 1933 and saw service in both the Second World War and the Korean War. During its service with the Royal Air Force (RAF), the squadron used aircraft such as the Blackburn Ripon, Blackburn Baffin, and Fairey Swordfish. After its transfer to the Royal Navy and the latter part of the Second World War, it alo operated the Fairey Barracuda. During the late nineteen forties and early nineteen fifties the squadron operated a number of variants of Fairey Firefly.

== History ==
=== Interwar (1933–1939) ===
The squadron was first formed on 3 April 1933 aboard the aircraft carrier HMS Glorious, then part of the Mediterranean Fleet, by amalgamating No 461 and 462 (Fleet Torpedo) Flights. Originally equipped with the Blackburn Ripon, these were replaced with the Blackburn Baffin in January 1934, with the squadron being the first to be fully equipped with this improved derivative of the Ripon. In June 1934, when Glorious returned to Britain for a refit, the Squadron transferred over to HMS Furious and in February 1935, moved over to HMS Eagle, disembarking in March and remaining shore based at Hal Far airfield in Malta until Glorious returned to the Mediterranean in September that year. On 24 November 1936, a cyclone hit Hal Far, destroying three hangars and wrecking seven of the squadron's Baffins. As a result, the squadron was re-equipped with the Fairey Swordfish in December 1936. Apart from a short visit to the UK to take part in the 1937 Coronation Review at Spithead, the squadron remained in the Mediterranean until the outbreak of the war in September 1939.

=== Second World War (1939–1945) ===
Glorious was then sent to patrol the Indian Ocean, but was recalled to home waters in early 1940 and 812 Squadron was transferred to RAF Coastal Command to take part in mining and bombing operations in the Low Countries and in the Dunkirk evacuation.

In March 1941 the squadron left Coastal Command to take part in Malta convoy protection duties aboard HMS Argus. In July, aboard HMS Furious, they participated in the attack on Petsamo. Further Malta convoy duties followed aboard Furious, transferring to HMS Ark Royal in September. After the Ark Royal was torpedoed and sunk on 13 November, the squadron regrouped at Gibraltar. While based at RNAS North Front, late on 30 November the U-boat was spotted by a Fairey Swordfish from 812 Squadron and heavily damaged by two bombs dropped by the aircraft. Unable to reach her destination, U-96 made for the port of Saint-Nazaire. The squadron received new aircraft equipped with Air-to-surface-vessel radar (ASV) enabling them to sink the U-boat U-451 on the night of 21 December 1941, and to damage five others. The squadron returned to the UK in April 1942 aboard the United States Navy's aircraft carrier USS Wasp (CV-7), and were reattached to Coastal Command in September to fly operations over the English Channel. On 18 December 1942, it was amalgamated into 811 Squadron.

==== Fairey Barracuda ====
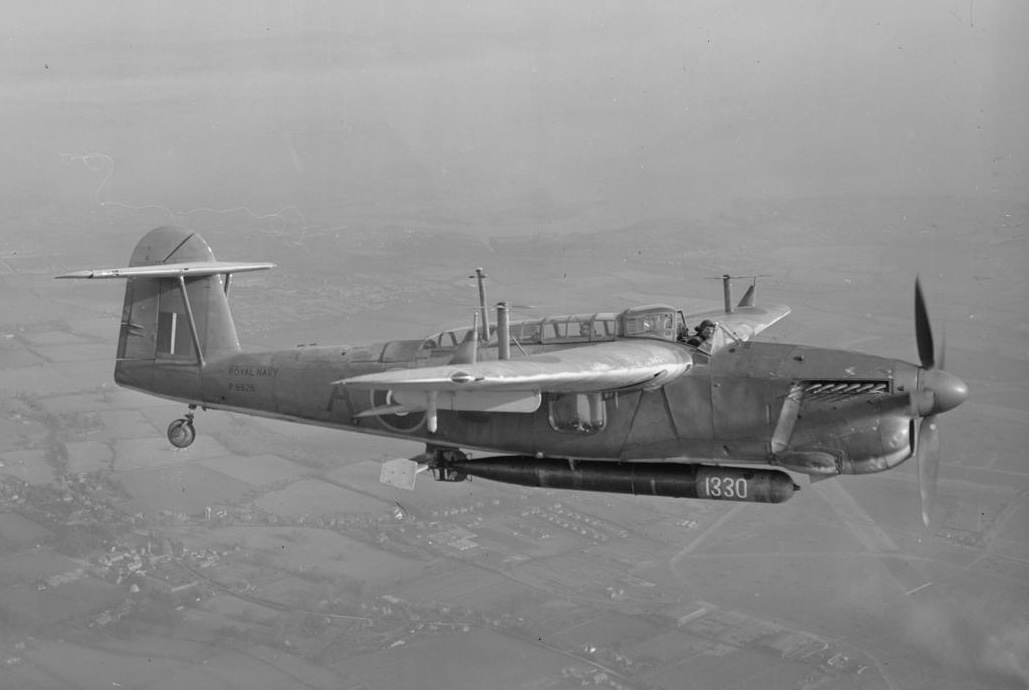
Fairey Barracuda; an example of the type used by 812 Squadron

812 Squadron was reformed on 1 June 1944 at RNAS Stretton, HMS Blackcap, Cheshire and was equipped with Fairey Barracuda, a carrier-borne torpedo and dive bomber aircraft. After short spells at RNAS Ballyhalbert (HMS Corncrake), Northern Ireland, and RAF Heathfield, Ayrshire, Scotland, the squadron embarked in the Colossus-class aircraft carrier light aircraft carrier HMS Vengeance in February 1945, along with 1850 Squadron, which flew Vought Corsair fighter aircraft, to form the 13th Carrier Air Group (13 CAG). Returning to the Mediterranean, 13 CAG were based at HMS Falcon at Hal Far, Malta, and flew exercises over Sicily. After the German surrender on 8 May 1945, the group were assigned to serve with the British Pacific Fleet.

The group sailed for Australia aboard HMS Vengeance, and were based at HMS Nabswick (MONAB V) at Jervis Bay from 22 July 1945, where they trained for the planned invasion of Japan. After the Japanese surrender on 8 August, they were temporarily based at HMS Nabaron, RNAS Ponam in the Admiralty Islands, before being sent to Hong Kong, arriving at HMS Nabcatcher (MONAB VIII) at Kai Tak, Hong Kong in October 1945, and remaining there until the end of the year.

=== Firefly (1946–1953) ===
No. 812 Squadron was re-equipped with the Fairey Firefly, and returned to Australia in January 1946, where they were based HMS Nabthorpe (MONAB VI) at Schofields, New South Wales, while Vengeance was in dry dock for repairs. In March 1946 Vengeance and her squadrons returned to the UK, via Ceylon, and arrived at RNAS Lee-on-Solent (HMS Daedalus) on 12 August 1946, where 812 Squadron was disbanded.

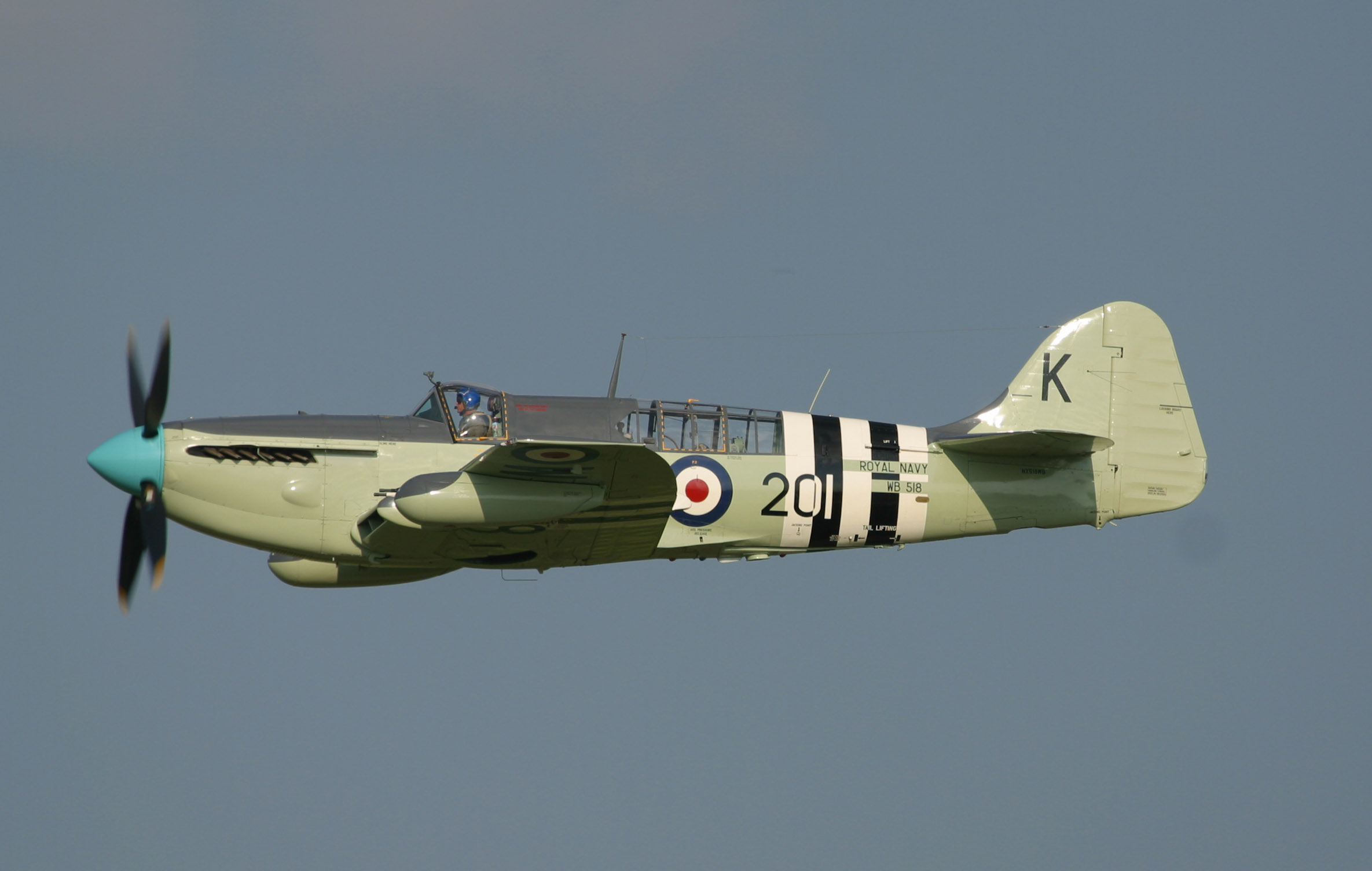
Fairey Firefly AS.6 in Korean War markings

The squadron was reformed again on 1 October 1946 at RNAS Eglinton (HMS Gannet) in Derry, Northern Ireland, and joined 804 Squadron, flying the Supermarine Seafire, to form the 14th Carrier Air Group. In February 1947, 14 CAG sailed aboard HMS Theseus on a lengthy Far Eastern cruise, eventually returning in December.

In August 1948 the group sailed for the Mediterranean aboard HMS Ocean, where Hal Far was used as a shore base. The group was transferred to HMS Glory in November 1949, and participated in several cruises and exercises, with landings being made on USS Midway (CV-41) in October.

In March 1951 Glory sailed for Korea, where 812 Squadron flew 852 sorties over the next six months, during which three aircraft were lost and several others damaged by AA fire. After two months based in Australia, Glory returned to Korean operations, where the squadron flew another 689 sorties, with 104 of them flown in one day. In May 1952 the squadron transferred its aircraft to Ocean, and the crews sailed home in Theseus.

In June 1952, the squadron was re-equipped with the Firefly AS.6 at RNAS Anthorn (HMS Nuthatch), and in September sailed aboard HMS Eagle for exercises and a visit to Oslo. In January 1953 the squadron joined Theseus for a cruise, returning to Eagle in June for exercises off northern Scotland. It was disbanded at Eglinton on 20 October 1953.

=== Gannet AS.1 (1955–1956) ===
The squadron was reformed for a third time at Eglinton on 7 November 1955 as an anti-submarine squadron, flying the Fairey Gannet. In April 1956 it sailed to the Mediterranean in Eagle, taking part in visits and exercises before flying home from Malta, and was disbanded on arrival at Lee-on-Solent on 13 December 1956.

== Aircraft flown ==
The squadron has flown a number of different aircraft types, including:

- Blackburn Ripon IIC torpedo bomber (April 1933 – January 1934)
- Blackburn Baffin Mk I torpedo bomber (January 1934 – December 1936)
- Fairey Swordfish I torpedo bomber (December 1936 – December 1942)
- Fairey Swordfish II torpedo bomber (October – December 1942)
- Fairey Barracuda Mk II torpedo and dive bomber (June 1944 – January 1946)
- Fairey Firefly FR.I fighter/reconnaissance aircraft (January – August 1946, October 1946 – February 1948)
- Fairey Firefly NF.Mk I night fighter (July 1948 – June 1949, November 1949 – January 1951)
- Fairey Firefly FR.Mk 4 fighter/reconnaissance aircraft (February – July 1948)
- Fairey Firefly FR.Mk 5 fighter/reconnaissance aircraft (July 1948 – September 1951)
- Fairey Firefly AS.Mk 6 anti-submarine aircraft (October 1951 – May 1952, June 1952 – October 1953)
- Fairey Gannet T.2 dual control trainer aircraft (November 1955 – March 1956)
- Fairey Gannet AS.1 Anti-submarine warfare aircraft (November 1955 – December 1956)

== Battle honours ==
The Battle Honours awarded to 812 Naval Air Squadron are:

- North Sea 1940
- English Channel 1940–42
- Mediterranean 1941
- Malta Convoys 1941
- Korea 1951–52

== Assignments ==
812 Naval Air Squadron was assigned as needed to form part of a number of larger units:

- 13th Carrier Air Group (30 June 1945 – August 1946)

== Commanding officers ==
List of commanding officers of 812 Naval Air Squadron:

1933 – 1942

- Flight Lieutenant F.E. Vernon, RAF, from 3 April 1933
- Squadron Leader G.H. Boyce, AFC, RAF, from 6 May 1933
- Flight Lieutenant B.B. Caswell, RAF, from 29 January 1934 (Squadron Leader 1 April 1934)
- Lieutenant Commander C.A.N. Hooper, RN, (Squadron Leader, RAF), from 11 November 1936
- Squadron Leader N.A.P Pritchett, RAF, from 23 November 1936
- Squadron Leader J.H. Hutchinson, RAF, from 26 April 1937
- Lieutenant Commander J.D.C. Little, RN, (Squadron Leader, RAF), from 1 November 1938
- Lieutenant Commander A.S. Bolt, RN, from 16 June 1939
- Lieutenant Commander N.G.R. Crawford, RN, from 22 April 1940
- Lieutenant Commander W.E. Waters, DFC, RN, from 6 September 1940
- Lieutenant Commander G.A.L. Woods, DSO, RN, from 16 November 1941
- Lieutenant Commander B.J. Prendergast, RN, 30 May 1942
- disbanded – 18 December 1942

1944 – 1946

- Lieutenant Commander(A) C.R.J. Coxon, RN, from 5 June 1944
- Lieutenant Commander(A) D.M.R. Wynne-Roberts, RN, from 25 January 1946
- disbanded – 12 August 1946

1946 – 1953

- Lieutenant Commander(A) D.M.R. Wynne-Roberts, RN, from 1 October 1946
- Lieutenant Commander F.G.B. Sheffield, DSC, RN, from 15 January 1948
- Lieutenant Commander R.M. Fell, RN, from 6 March 1949
- Lieutenant Commander R.G. Hunt, RN, from 17 July 1950
- Lieutenant Commander F.A. Swanton, DSC & Bar, RN, from 1 March 1951
- Lieutenant Commander J.M. Culbertson, RN, from 18 December 1951
- disbanded – 20 October 1953

1955 – 1956

- Lieutenant Commander G.D. Luff, DFC, RN, from 7 November 1955
- disbanded – 13 December 1956

Note: Abbreviation (A) signifies Air Branch of the RN or RNVR.

== See also ==
- Mervyn Williams – Royal Air Force Group Captain and former pilot of 812 Squadron during 1935.
