= Blackburn Baffin =

1932 torpedo bomber aircraft by Blackburn

Baffin
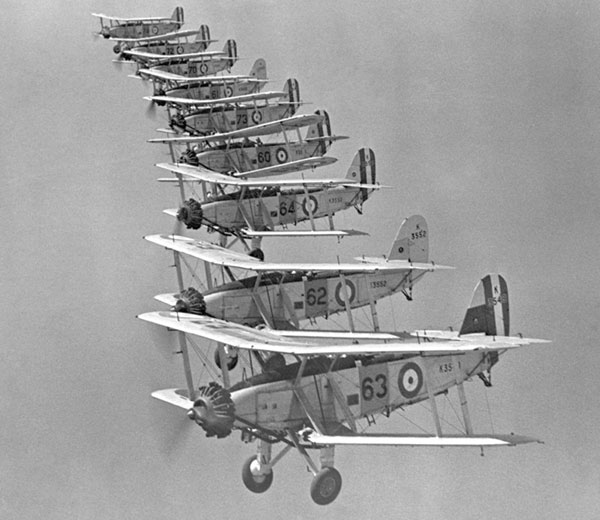

General information
- Type: Torpedo bomber
- Manufacturer: Blackburn Aircraft
- Designer: F. A. Bumpus
- Primary users: Fleet Air Arm Royal New Zealand Air Force
- Number built: 97

History
- Introduction date: January 1934
- First flight: 30 September 1932
- Retired: 1941

The Blackburn B-5 Baffin was a biplane torpedo bomber designed and produced by the British aircraft manufacturer Blackburn Aircraft. It was a development of the Ripon, the chief change being that a 545 hp (406 kW) Bristol Pegasus I.MS radial engine had replaced the Ripon's Napier Lion water-cooled inline engine.

The Baffin was designed by Major F. A. Bumpus and was initially pursued as a private venture. It was a conventional two-seat single-bay biplane of mixed metal and wooden construction with fabric covering. It had swept, staggered, equal-span wings, the lower having an inverse gull to provide clearance for the torpedo while retaining a short undercarriage. The engine was shifted forwards in comparison to that of the Ripon to retain its centre of gravity. Armament comprised a fixed forward-firing 0.303 in (7.7 mm) Vickers machine gun and one free-mounted 0.303 in (7.7 mm) Lewis gun in the rear cockpit, plus one 2,000 lb (910 kg) bomb, or 1,576 lb (715 kg) Mk VIII or Mk IX torpedo, or three 530 lb (240 kg) or six 250 lb (110 kg) bombs.

First flown on 30 September 1932, the project caught the interest of the Air Ministry, who produced Specification 4/33 around the aircraft and placed an initial order with Blackburn for it in early 1933. The Baffin was initially procured for the Fleet Air Arm (FAA), who transferred many of their Ripons to Blackburn for remanufacturing into the Baffin configuration; new-build aircraft were also produced. During January 1934, it was introduced to service. It had a relatively short service life with the FAA, who elected to withdraw the type in favour of newer aircraft prior to the outbreak of the Second World War in September 1939. The only export customer for the Baffin was the Royal New Zealand Air Force, who had acquired 29 existing aircraft from Britain during 1937. These were largely used in reserve roles and for training, and were only operated for a short period into the conflict until their withdrawal sometime in 1941.

== Development ==
During the early 1930s, the torpedo bomber squadrons of the FAA were equipped with the Blackburn Ripon. While the Ripon had only entered service in 1930, it was powered by the elderly Napier Lion engine. As early as 1928, Blackburn had recognised that the replacement of the Lion with a modern air-cooled radial engine would present several advantages. Dispensing of the Lion's heavy water-cooled radiators would reduce weight and thus increase payload; air-cooling would also simplify maintenance. The company had initially pursued this direct when it dought export sales, an alternative powerplant in the form of the Armstrong Siddeley Tiger engine was adopted on those Ripons sold to Finland.

Blackburn remained keen to use low-weight radial engines for its fighters during the early 1930s. It drew up plans for a reengining of existing Ripons with either the Armstrong Siddeley Tiger and the second by the Bristol Pegasus engines, which were viewed as having particularly promising performance. As the detailed design of the aircraft was produced, there were no meaningful changes to the airframe save for a new type of engine mounting that was projected on steel struts and was also shifted forwards so that the aircraft's centre of gravity could be maintained.

During 1932, Blackburn decided to build two prototypes of radial-engined Ripons, each powered by one of these engines, as a private venture (i.e. without an order from the Air Ministry). Both of the prototypes were completed in September 1932. On 30 September 1932, the Pegasus-engined prototype conducted its maiden flight, flown by A. M. Blake. Following the completion of manufacturer tests, in February 1933, the two prototypes were delivered to RAF Martlesham Heath, Suffolk, for competitive evaluation flights. Partway through the evaluation, the aircraft were briefly returned to Blackburn at Brough to be fitted with bomb rails and a Townend ring. The Air Ministry paid attention to these trials and expressed its preference for the Pegasus-powered version of the aircraft.

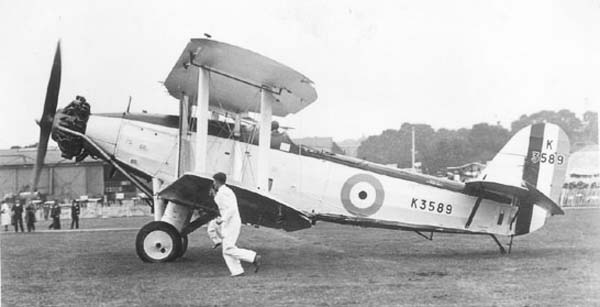
A Baffin, 1934

During early 1933, Specification 4/33 was written around the aircraft for it to serve as a short-term replacement for the FAA's Ripons. An initial order was issued to Blackburn for a pair of pre-production aircraft, which were speedily constructed. In April, acceptance trials at Martlesham Heath had commenced with the first pre-production aircraft, while the second remained at Brought for trial installations. Sea trials were later performed aboard the aircraft carrier HMS Courageous; on 2 February 1934, the first catapult-assisted takeoff was performed at RAE Farnborough. During September 1933, it was announced that the Air Ministry had approved the name Baffin.

On 10 November 1933, the first production aircraft made its first flight. Work was underway on the production of 26 new aircraft along with 38 conversions of airframes from Ripons; the airframes were extensively refurbished. The aviation author Aubrey Joseph Jackson noted that the rate of manufacturing was particularly fast. During 1935, a further 26 conversions of Ripons into Baffins were ordered due to the reliability problems that had become associated with the Armstrong Siddeley Tiger engines that had powered the Blackburn Shark. A further factor was the political desire to expand the strength of the Fleet Air Arm. An additional three new production Baffins had the 580 hp (430 kW) Pegasus II.M3 engine and were termed the Baffin T8A. The aircraft is said to have inspired the coining of the word "Boffin".

== Operational service ==
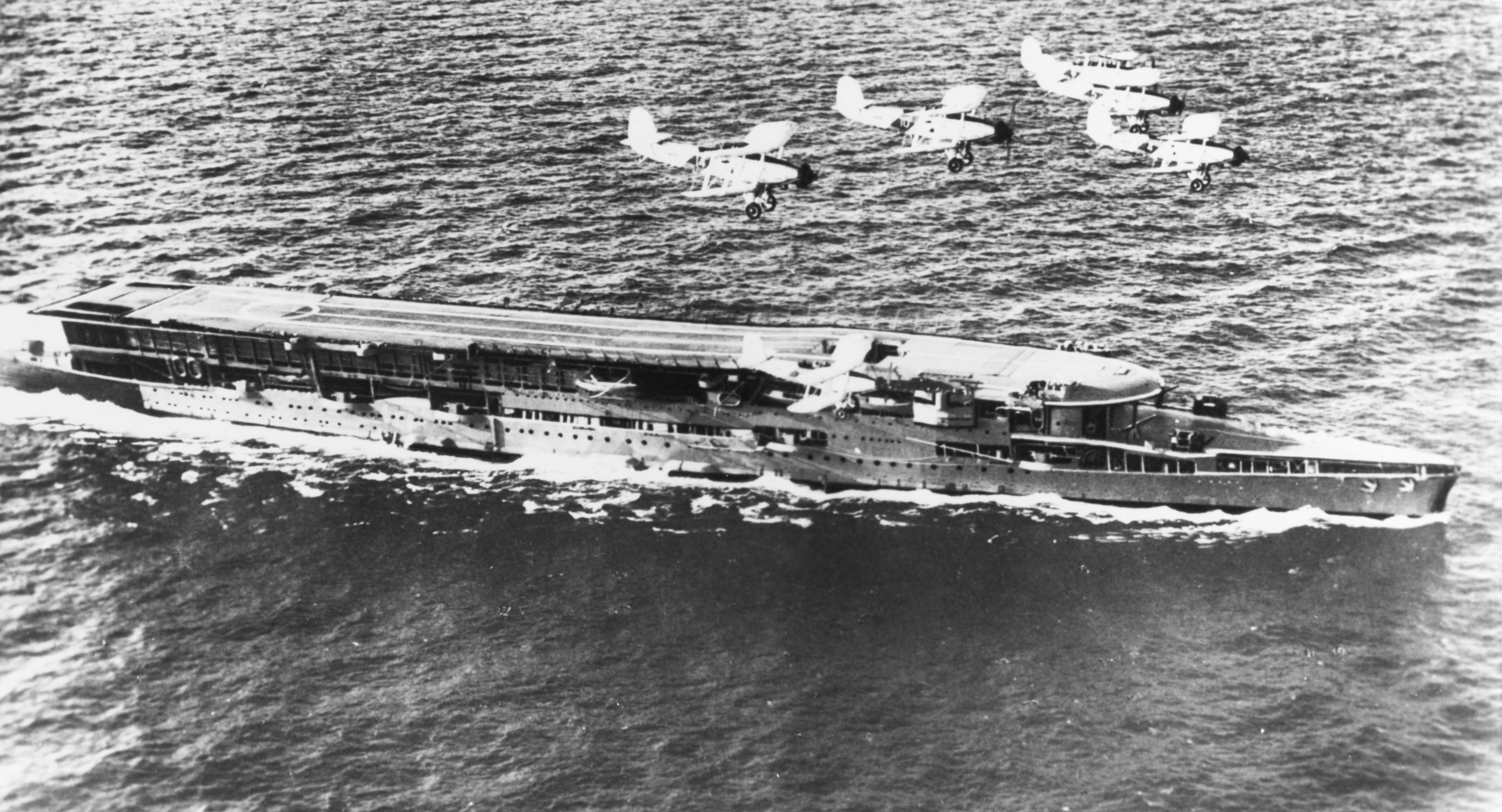
A flight of Baffins passing over HMS Furious, circa 1936

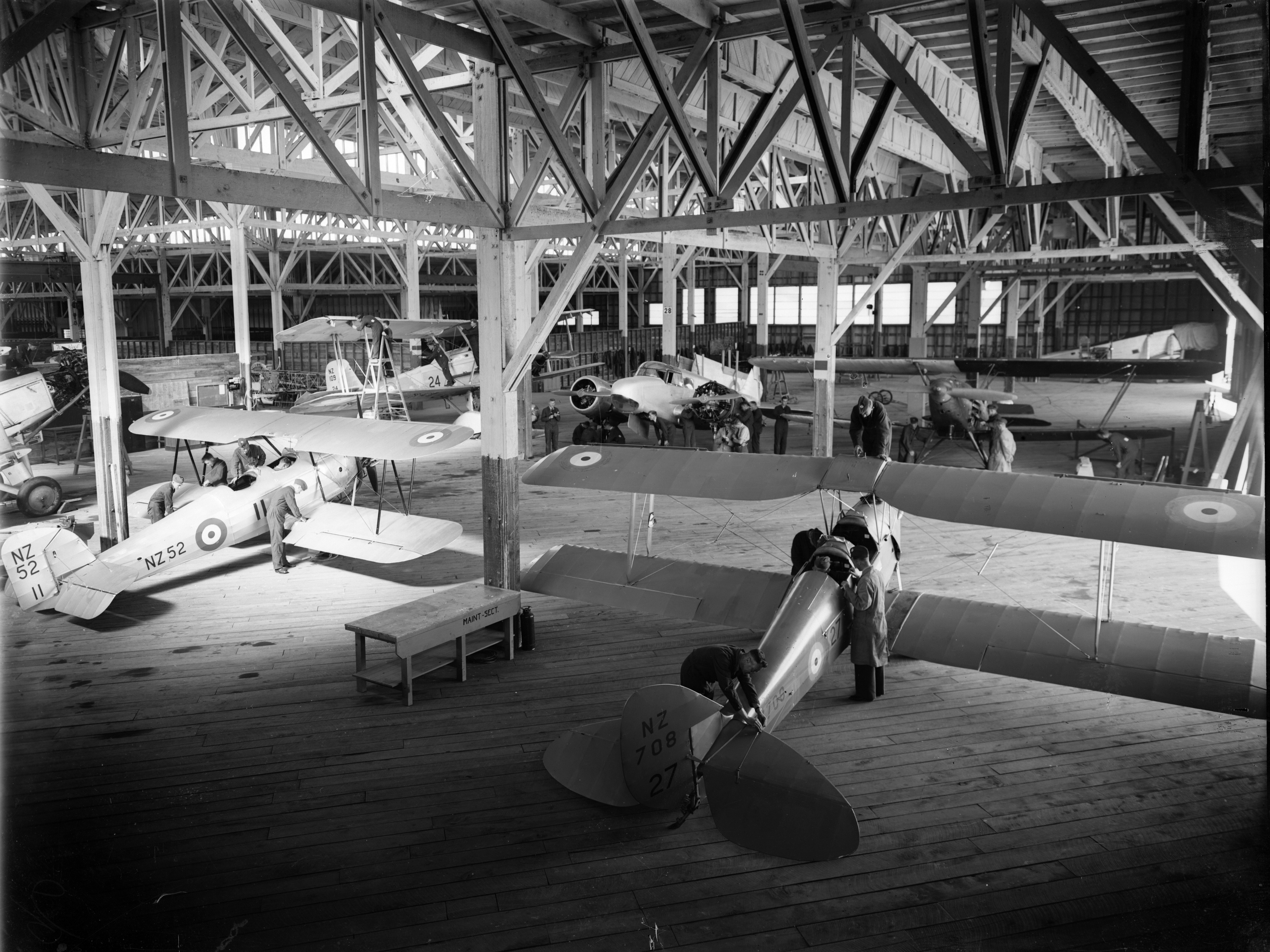
Baffins amongst other aircraft at the Royal New Zealand Air Force Technical Training School, Rongotai, circa 1940

Initial deliveries, including the two prototypes and 33 production Baffins, went to Gosport for training purposes, such as dummy deck-landings and torpedo practice. During January 1934, 810 Naval Air Squadron (NAS) was the first to be re-equipping with the Baffin. On 7 March 1934, it was officially announced that the Baffin would be adopted as the standard torpedo bomber of the FAA. Through 1934, efforts were made to quickly disseminate the new aircraft beyond the home region, leading to many being dispatched in kit form overseas to Malta and the Middle East, to equip units in these regions.

As early as January 1935, the Baffin was used at sea with 810 NAS aboard Courageous. In August of that year, 811 NAS aboard HMS Furious also received the type, while 812 NAS on HMS Glorious converted during May 1935. A flight of six Baffins of 810 NAS headed the formation of FAA aircraft during the Jubilee Board Review off Spithead on 15 July 1935. On 22 June 1936, one Baffin, while closely circling the French ocean liner SS Normandie, collided with one of its derricks and crashed onto its foredeck.

In 1936 the Baffin began to be replaced in front-line service by more capable aircraft such as the Fairey Swordfish and the Blackburn Shark. The last FAA squadron to operate the Baffin was 812 NAS, with most aircraft lost with the destruction of a hangar caused by a tornado in December 1936. During September 1937 all remaining aircraft were struck off and shipped back to Britain. Entering storage, the type did not reenter British service with the outbreak of the Second World War and played no role in the conflict.

During August 1937, New Zealand arranged to acquire an initial batch of 12 Baffins from the Air Ministry, these were delivered in November of that year. The ministry subsequently approach the country seeking to sell further aircraft, thus 17 of the best-condition Baffins still in storage were also purchased and delivered throughout 1938. Despite the arrival of more capable types, these aircraft were equipped by the Territorial Air Force (reserve) squadrons based in Auckland, Wellington, and Christchurch as it was felt that the Baffin's obsolescence did not impinge on its value for conducting local coastal defence operations.

By September 1939, all three reserve squadrons had been fully equipped. It is believed that 24 Baffins were in an operational condition at the outbreak of the Second World War, 16 of which being stationed in Wellington while eight were based in Christchurch. These aircraft had been largely used as trainers prior to hostilities but, with the realisation of the threat posed by surface raiders, New Zealand's Baffins were returned to the active list. They were often dispatched on sea reconnaissance missions, aimed at maintaining awareness of nearby shipping and identifying potential threats.

During March 1940, all of the surviving aircraft were merged into the NZ General Reconnaissance Squadron based at Whenuapai. In 1941, this unit was renamed 1 GR Squadron, at which point half its strength was transferred to 3 GR Squadron. Baffins continued to patrol the approaches to Lyttelton, Dunedin, and the Foveaux Straits up until this point. The type was replaced by the larger American-built Lockheed Hudson before the outbreak of war with Imperial Japan. The last Baffins were reportedly broken up at Rongotai in 1941.

== Surviving aircraft ==
The wreck of RNZAF Baffin NZ160, which crashed during 1937, is being rebuilt by Don Subritzky at Dairy Flat.

A second fuselage section was stored in Mapua, South Island, New Zealand as part of the late John Smith collection and has since joined the Subritzky collection.

== Operators ==
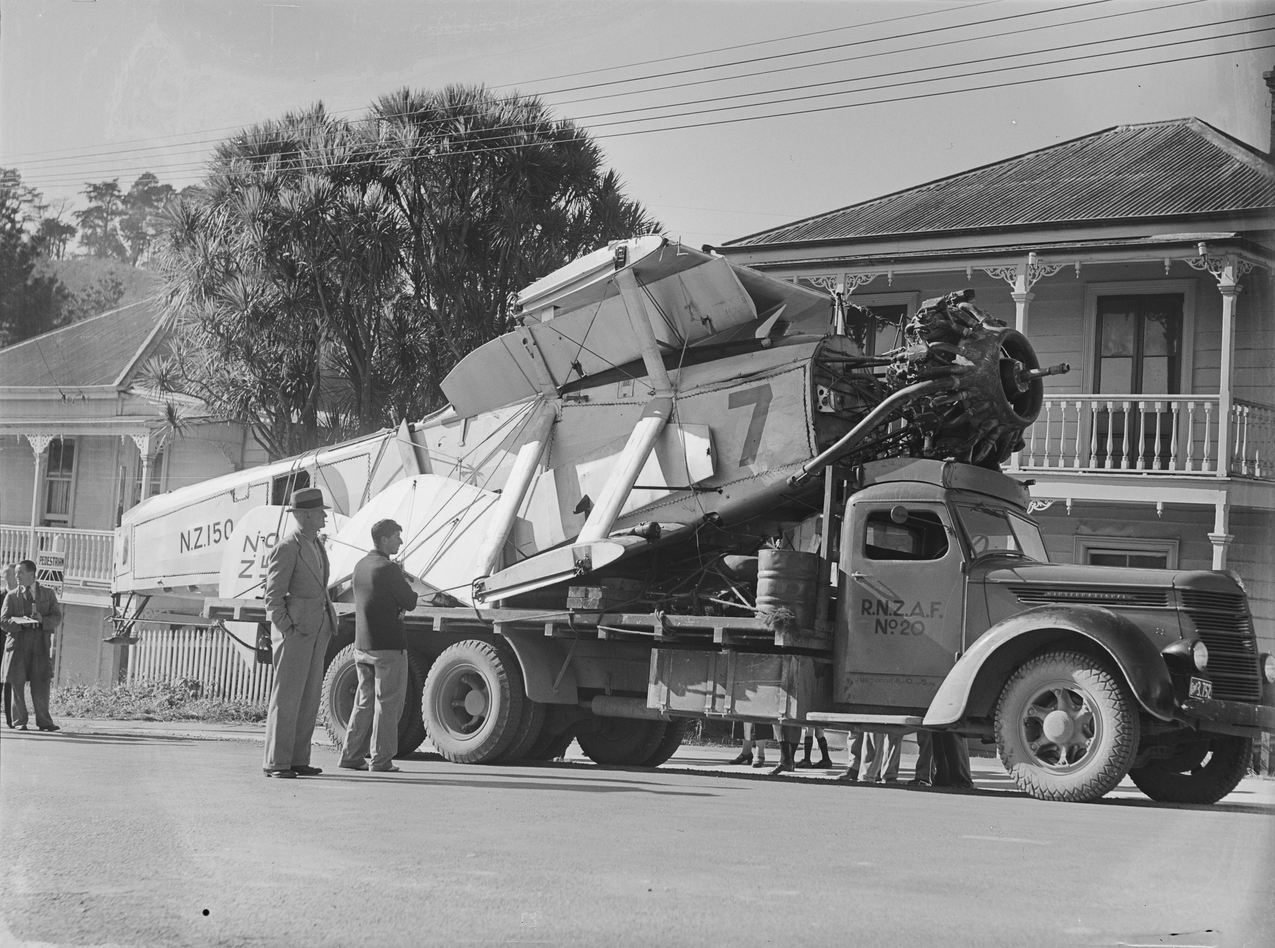
RNZAF Baffin disassembled, on a truck

United Kingdom

- Royal Air Force - Fleet Air Arm
  - 810 Squadron RAF
  - 811 Squadron RAF
  - 812 Squadron RAF
  - 820 Squadron RAF

New Zealand

- Royal New Zealand Air Force
  - No. 1 Squadron RNZAF
  - No. 2 Squadron RNZAF
  - No. 3 Squadron RNZAF

== Variants ==
- T.5J Ripon Mk V : Prototypes. Two built.
  - Blackburn B-4 : Company designation of the first prototype.
  - Blackburn B-5 : Company designation of the second prototype.
- Baffin Mk I : Two-seat torpedo bomber aircraft for the Royal Navy.

== Specifications (T.8 Baffin) ==
Data from The British Bomber since 1914.

General characteristics

- Crew: 2
- Length: 38 ft 3 3/4 in (11.678 m)
- Wingspan: 44 ft 10 in (13.67 m)
- Width: 17 ft 10 in (5.44 m) folded
- Height: 12 ft 10 in (3.91 m)
- Wing area: 683 sq ft (63.5 m^{2})
- Empty weight: 3,184 lb (1,444 kg)
- Gross weight: 7,610 lb (3,452 kg)
- Powerplant: 1 × Bristol Pegasus I.M3 nine-cylinder air-cooled radial piston engine, 565 hp (421 kW)
- Propellers: 2-bladed fixed-pitch propeller

Performance

- Maximum speed: 136 mph (219 km/h, 118 kn) at 6,500 ft (2,000 m)
- Range: 490 mi (790 km, 430 nmi)
- Endurance: four hours and 30 minutes
- Service ceiling: 15,000 ft (4,600 m)
- Rate of climb: 600 ft/min (3.0 m/s) at 5,000 ft (1,500 m)

Armament

- Guns:

- 1 × forward firing fixed 0.303 in (7.7 mm) Vickers gun
- 1 × 0.303 in (7.7 mm) Lewis gun in rear cockpit

- Bombs:

- 1 × 1,800 lb (820 kg) 18 in (457 mm) torpedo or 1,600 lb (730 kg) of bombs.

== See also ==
Aircraft of comparable role, configuration, and era

- Blackburn Shark
- Fairey III
- Fairey Gordon
- Vickers Vildebeest
