= Mervyn Williams =

Royal Air Force Group Captain (1911 – 1987)

- Born: 24 March 1911; Steyning, Sussex, England
- Died: 13 March 1987 (aged 75); St Albans, Hertfordshire, England
- Military career
- Allegiance: United Kingdom
- Branch: Royal Air Force
- Service years: 1931–1958
- Rank: Group captain
- Service number: 26250
- Commands: No. 42 Squadron RAF; RAF Akrotiri
- Conflicts: Second World War
- Awards: Commander of the Order of the British Empire; Distinguished Service Order; Mentioned in Dispatches

Group Captain Mervyn Francis Douglas Williams CBE DSO (24 March 1911 – 13 March 1987) was a British Royal Air Force pilot of the Second World War who later served as security coordinator at 10 Downing Street.

== Early life ==
Williams was the son of Herbert Douglas Williams, a school headmaster, and Alice Elizabeth Piper. He was educated at Brighton College and the Royal Air Force College Cranwell.

== Career ==
He commissioned into the RAF on 19 December 1931. Between September 1933 and April 1934, he served with 811 Naval Air Squadron, before serving with 812 Naval Air Squadron until March 1935. Williams then undertook a course at the Air Armament School at RAF Eastchurch. He was promoted to flight lieutenant on 19 June 1936. He then served at RAF Gosport with a Naval Squadron, and was promoted to squadron leader on 1 February 1939.

In 1942, Williams became Commanding Officer of No. 42 Squadron RAF, which was operating as a torpedo-bomber unit at the time. In March 1942, his airplane crashed and exploded while returning from a raid along the Norwegian coast, although Williams was uninjured. On 17 May 1942, he led his squadron's 48 aircraft (Bristol Blenheims and Bristol Beauforts) in a night-time torpedo attack against the German cruiser Prinz Eugen. During the attack, Williams' aircraft was shot down. He was subsequently recovered from the sea by the Germans; the only survivor from his four-man crew.

He became a prisoner of war, held at Stalag Luft III. He became camp intelligence officer and was involved in planning the break-out immortalised as the "Great Escape".

Following his release at the end of the war, Williams served with the RAF in Malta, Aden and Cyprus. In 1950, he became the first Commanding Officer of RAF Akrotiri. On 3 July 1958 he retired from the RAF.

In 1961 he was appointed security coordinator at 10 Downing Street. He served in the role for 15 years under Harold Macmillan, Alec Douglas-Home, Harold Wilson and Edward Heath.

== Honours ==
Williams was awarded the Distinguished Service Order for his leadership of No. 42 Squadron during the engagement in which he was shot down. The citation reads:

During the time this officer commanded No. 42 Squadron he was responsible for raising it to a high standard of operational efficiency. On the night of May 17th, 1942, he led a force comprising Beauforts, Hudsons, Blenheims and Beaufighters in an attack on the Prinz Eugen. Despite intense defensive fire from the cruiser and four escorting destroyers, Wing Cdr. Williams led his force into the attack with great courage and determination. Unfortunately, he was shot down during the engagement and is a prisoner of war. He always displayed inspiring leadership.|Citation for Distinguished Service Order, London Gazette, 4 August 1942.

He was mentioned in dispatches twice during the war and a third time in 1947. He was also appointed Commander of the Order of the British Empire in the 1951 Birthday Honours.

== Personal life ==
On 28 January 1972, he married Jane Hull in Kensington.
