= Handley Page H.P.31 Harrow =

Two-seat single-engined biplane

H.P.31 Harrow
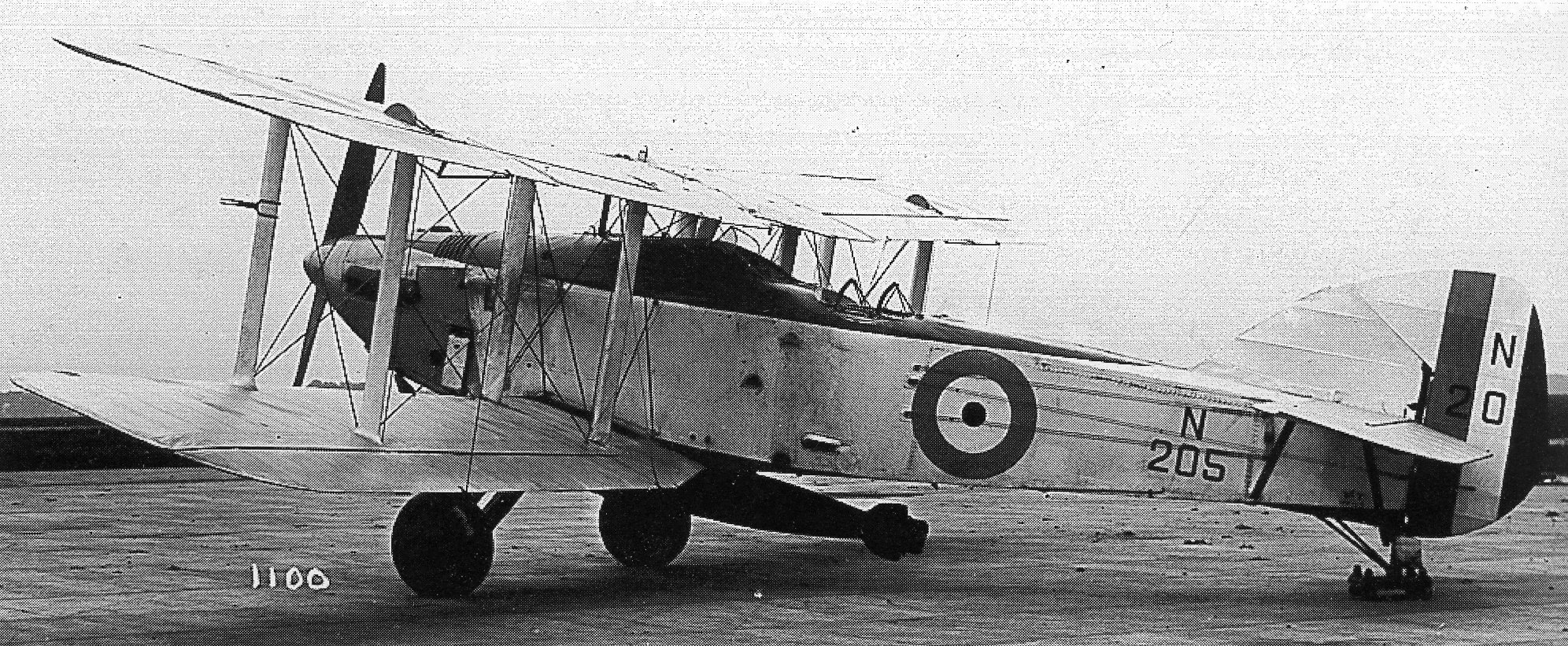
- First prototype in 1927 with new cowling

General information
- Type: Bomber, torpedo bomber and reconnaissance aircraft
- National origin: United Kingdom
- Manufacturer: Handley Page
- Number built: 2

History
- First flight: 24 April 1926
- Retired: 1928

The Handley Page H.P.31 was a two-seat single-engined biplane built to a British specification for a carrier-based torpedo bomber and reconnaissance aircraft. After trials, the Blackburn Ripon was preferred, though the Harrow played a significant role in the development of automatic slots.

== Development ==
In early 1924, the Air Ministry specification 21/23 was issued, calling for a two-seat replacement for the Blackburn Dart capable of acting as a torpedo or conventional bomber over short ranges as well as having 12-hour reconnaissance capability. The Harrow, initially known as the Type E but retrospectively as the H.P.31 when the company introduced numerical designations in 1924, was Handley Page's tender. They were successful, receiving an order to build two prototypes.

The Harrow was essentially a single-bay biplane, though there was an additional pair of interplane struts at the extremities of the centre section. The wings had the same span and constant chord and neither sweep nor stagger. Both upper and lower wings had outboard ailerons and inboard flaps, the latter ending at the centre section. Both wings also had leading edge slats along their full length. The outer sections of these were linked to downward movement of the ailerons and the inner sections to the flaps. The lower wing was flat but the upper carried 4.5^{o} of dihedral so the gap increased quite noticeably along the span. As usual with carrier-borne aircraft, the wings folded at the centre section. The wings were fabric-covered; one difference between the two prototypes was that the second had metal wing spars and another, that its slats could be operated independently.

It was powered by a single water-cooled Napier Lion engine, initially a 470 hp (350 kW) mark V, mounted as low in the nose as airscrew ground clearance allowed so that the top of the fuselage could fall away in front of the cockpit for the best views during high-incidence carrier landings. There was a front-mounted radiator immediately beneath the propeller shaft. The pilot sat below the upper wing just behind the rear spar and with a cutout for visibility. The observer/gunner's position was close behind the pilot for ease of communication, since he had to do the work of navigation on long flights away from the carrier that had been traditionally assigned to a third crew member. Behind them the fabric-covered fuselage carried a conventional tail with horn-balanced control surfaces, though the incidence of the whole tailplane could also be adjusted.

The Harrow had to have a clear space below the fuselage to allow torpedo dropping. The main legs were attached to the front spar at the ends of the centre section, and pairs of bracing struts ran from the stub axles to the lower fuselage longerons. Snap link hooks were fitted to the inner ends of the axles to engage with the longitudinal arrester wires of the time. The specification required that the land undercarriage could be replaced rapidly with floats. These were long, single stepped and fitted with water rudders, built by Short Brothers.

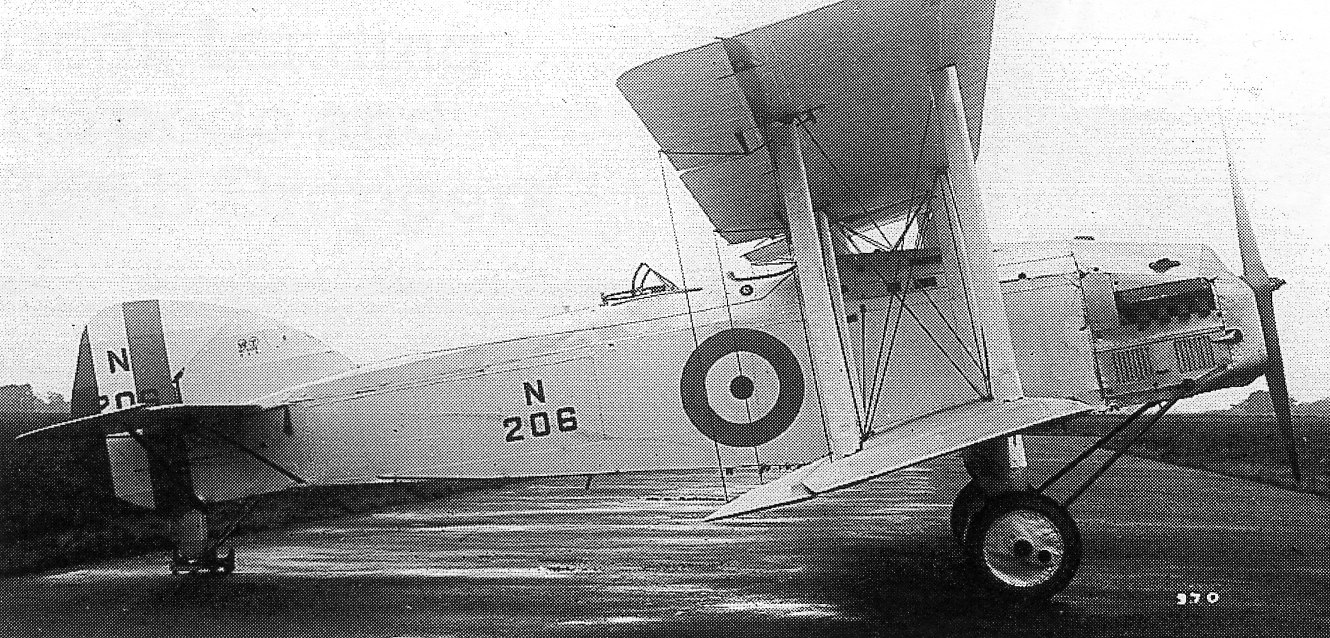
Second prototype

The first flight of the Harrow was made by Hubert Broad on 24 April 1926. A number of minor issues emerged from the early flying programme, but one consistent theme was that of engine overheating. By the end of May the Harrow was taking off and landing on HMS Furious as part of the specification competition. It went to RAF Martlesham Heath for further Air Ministry specification tests late in August. In December it was replaced there by the second prototype which had first flown on 30 October 1924. By the spring of 1927 it was clear that the Blackburn Ripon was preferred, and in June the second prototype was returned to Handley Page rather than going forward to the seaplane trials, chiefly because of its persistent overheating. Nonetheless, Handley Page gained funding for a Harrow Mk II using a more powerful Napier Lion XI engine producing 530 hp (395 kW) in the first prototype airframe. This engine was housed in a slimmer, more pointed cowling with a semi-circular cross-section radiator under the nose. At the same time drag was reduced and rudder and elevator lightness improved by lowering the rear fuselage decking and with it the gunner's position. Later in the summer a Lion XA was fitted, together with a larger, square radiator. Further modifications to the Mk II followed with the addition of dihedral to both wings, a slimmer nose and retractable side radiators like those on its competitor, the Ripon II. There were further modifications to flaps and slots before the aircraft went back to Martlesham to compete against the Ripon II and the Avro Buffalo II, performing torpedo dropping trials before going to Felixstowe as a floatplane. Here it proved unsatisfactory, suffering water spray damage, and was written off charge in August 1928.

During late summer 1927, the second prototype had been involved in continuing the series of Air Ministry tests of slats previously conducted on the Hendon III. It used the latest version of automatic wingtip slats and was hailed as a great success and a sure defence against the inadvertent spin. It was retired at the end of September.

== Specifications (Harrow II, landplane) ==
Data from Barnes & James 1987, pp. 368

General characteristics

- Crew: two
- Length: 34 ft 10 in (10.62 m)
- Wingspan: 46 ft 0 in (14.02 m)
- Wing area: 591 sq ft (54.9 m^{2})
- Empty weight: 4,125 lb (1,870 kg)
- Gross weight: 7,310 lb (3,316 kg)
- Powerplant: 1 × Napier Lion XIA 12-cylinder W configuration (broad arrow) water-cooled , 530 hp (395 kW)

Performance

- Maximum speed: 126 mph (202 km/h, 109 kn)
- Range: 450 mi (725 km, 390 nmi)
- Service ceiling: 15,300 ft (4,730 m)

Armament

- 1×0.303 in (7.7 mm) Vickers machine gun fixed forward firing through airscrew
- 1×0.303 in (7.7 mm) Lewis machine gun on Scarff ring
- 1×18 in (457 mm) torpedo or 3×520lb (236 kg) bombs
