= Blackburn Ripon =

Carrier-based torpedo bomber aircraft

Ripon
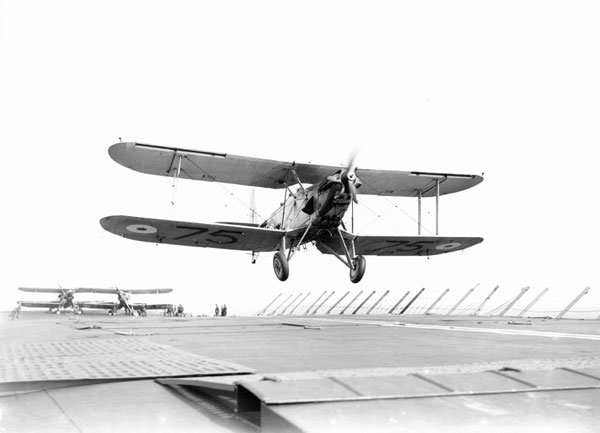

General information
- Type: Torpedo bomber
- Manufacturer: Blackburn Aircraft
- Status: Out of service
- Primary users: Fleet Air Arm Finnish Air Force
- Number built: 121 (including 5 prototypes)

History
- First flight: 17 April 1926
- Retired: 1944 (Finland)
- Variant: Blackburn Baffin
- Developed into: Mitsubishi B2M

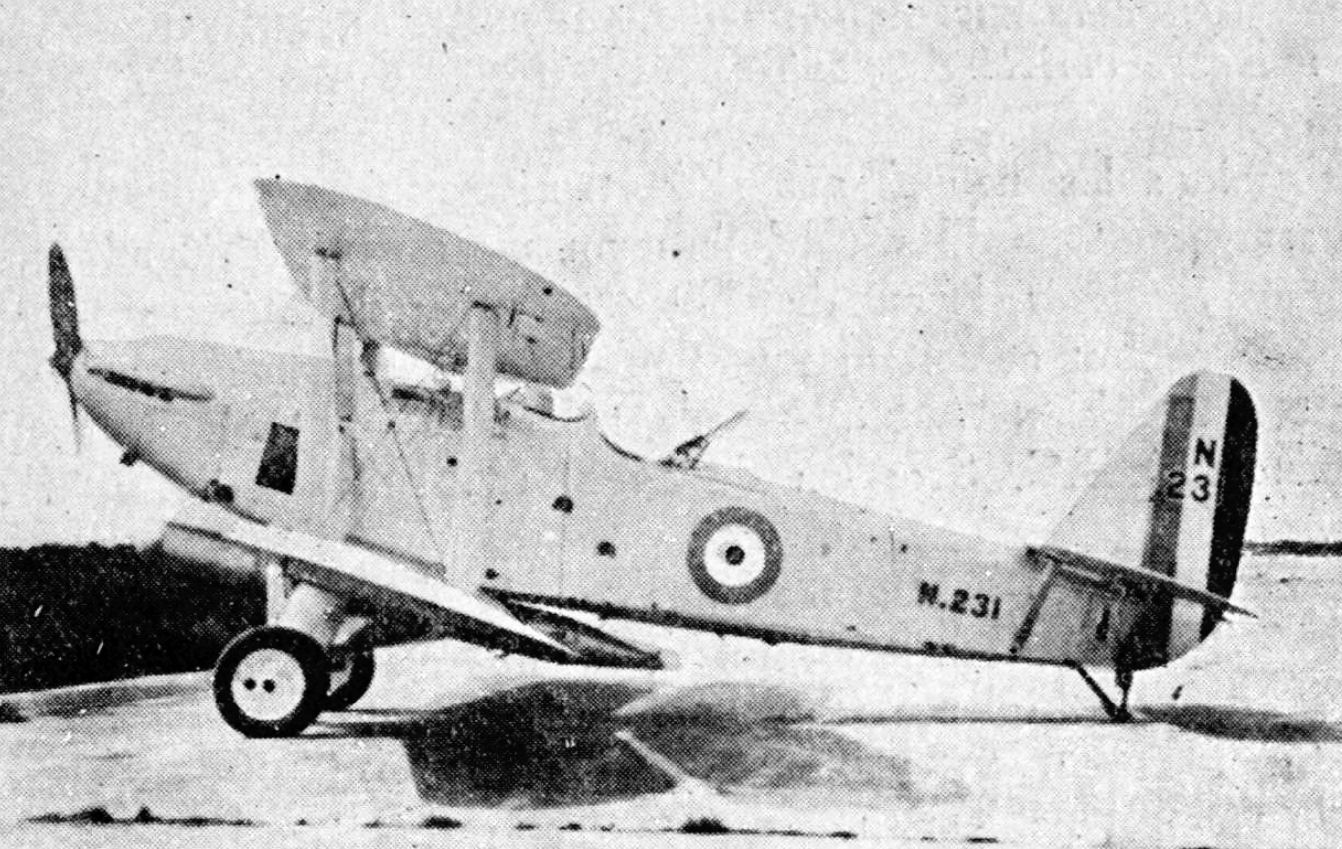
Blackburn Ripon Mk. II in 1929

The Blackburn T.5 Ripon was a carrier-based torpedo bomber and reconnaissance biplane designed and produced by the British aircraft manufacturer Blackburn Aircraft. It was the basis for both the license-produced Mitsubishi B2M and the improved Blackburn Baffin.

The Ripon was designed as a successor to the Blackburn Dart torpedo bomber as well as a long-range reconnaissance aircraft to fulfil Air Ministry Specification 21/23. The first prototype made its maiden flight on 17 April 1926, it was subsequently redesigned with a more effective engine installation, an enlarged rudder and increased wing sweepback. It was originally ordered into production for the Fleet Air Arm (FAA), which primarily operated the type as a torpedo bomber.

The Ripon was operated by the FAA between 1930 and 1935, after which point it was withdrawn in favour of the Blackburn Baffin, which was an improved derivative of the Ripon. It was also produced overseas in Finland; many of the Ripons in service with the Finnish Air Force saw extensive use in both the Winter War and the Continuation War, typically flying nighttime reconnaissance missions.

== Development ==
=== Background ===
The origins of the Ripon can be traced back to the mid-1920s and the issuing of Air Ministry Specification 21/23, which sought a replacement for the Fleet Air Arm's (FAA) single-seat Dart that could operate both as a torpedo bomber and a reconnaissance aircraft. It was stipulated that it should have a two-man crew, comprising a pilot and navigator/gunner to facilitate long-range reconnaissance missions; for the same reason, the aircraft was to have a maximum endurance of at least 12 hours. A further requirement was that it should have an interchangeable undercarriage between wheeled and float-equipped configurations, facilitating its operation from both land and sea.

Blackburn begin work on its response to the specification during 1925, directed by F. A. Bumpus. The resulting aircraft, which was designed around the Napier Lion V engine, drew heavily on the preceding Blackburn Velos coastal defence seaplane, having a broadly similar structure with the exception of its use of single-bay wings and the anhedral on the bottom central section. The lower mainplane was of a slightly larger span than the lower, while an atypical feature in the form of a lower wing root fairing. A single Lewis gun fitted on a rotating mounting around the rear cockpit formed the defensive armament. Offensive armaments consisted of six 230lb bombs, or three 520lb bombs, or a single 18-inch torpedo.

A pair of prototypes were built. On 17 April 1926, the first prototype made its maiden flight in a landplane configuration, flown by P. W. S. Bulman. On 26 August of that year, the second prototype made its first flight as a seaplane, piloted by J. D. Rennie. During December 1926, the Marine Aircraft Experimental Establishment at Felixstowe commenced a formal evaluation of the aircraft. Initial trials against its competitors, the Handley Page Harrow and the Avro Buffalo, showed that none of the competitors were adequate, so the Ripon was redesigned with an improved engine installation, an enlarged rudder and increased sweepback on the wings. The revised aircraft was evaluated and declared to be the winner, after which Blackburn was awarded a production contract for the type.

=== Into production ===
The first production aircraft made its first flight in late 1927. Referred to as the Ripon II, design changes from the prototypes gave it a distinctly different appearance, such as its more pointy nose as a consequence of the new cowling and retractable radiators for engine cooling. The undercarriage had been drastically redesigned as well, featuring telescopic oleo struts fitted to the outboard ends of the bottoms centre front spar. Structurally the aircraft was largely unchanged and continued to conform with established Blackburn practices of the era, The gun ring was redesigned for a lower positioning, along with a slot in the rear decking for it to be locked into when not in use; the cockpit was also extended rearwards to house more apparatus.

On 15 May 1928, the first production aircraft made its public debut, performing a flying demonstration that included a practice torpedo deployment over the Humber along with some aerobatic manoeuvres in front of the assembled press. During 1928 and 1929, Blackburn received contracts for a combined 20 Ripon IIs. In early 1930, more substantial orders for 40 of the improved Ripon IIA were placed; this variant made greater use of duralumin in its wings and provided a mildly raised all-up weight. The production rate reached two aircraft per week around this time, which was facilitated by the subcontracting of some component manufacturing to the competing British aviation manufacturer Boulton Paul Aircraft.

Between 1931 and 1932, 31 Ripon IICs were constructed, which had greater sweepback and eliminated all use of wood present in the structure of the mainplane. Many of the earlier production aircraft were rebuilt to the Ripon IIC standard during the early 1930s. It was the final production standard of the Ripon to be procured by a domestic air service. Instead, the Ripon served as the basis for the Baffin, which was effectively more advanced version of the type. Starting in January 1934, the Baffin begun to replace its predecessor in FAA service. Many of the Ripons were returned to Blackburn and remanufactured into Baffins.

In addition to the British armed forces, Blackburn had extensive efforts to promote the Ripon to potential overseas customers. These efforts involved explorations of its reengining with BMW and Hispano-Suiza powerplants, largely due to the later models of the Napier Lion engine being still on the official secrets list at that time. The Spanish Navy was one of the company's acknowledged targets. During August 1928, an order for a single pattern aircraft was issued by Finland; this aircraft, designated T.5D, was outfitted with a Bristol Jupiter radial engine and an interchangeable undercarriage and delivered to the Finnish Air Force on 29 September 1929. Finland also purchased a license to produce the Ripon from Blackburn.

== Operational history ==
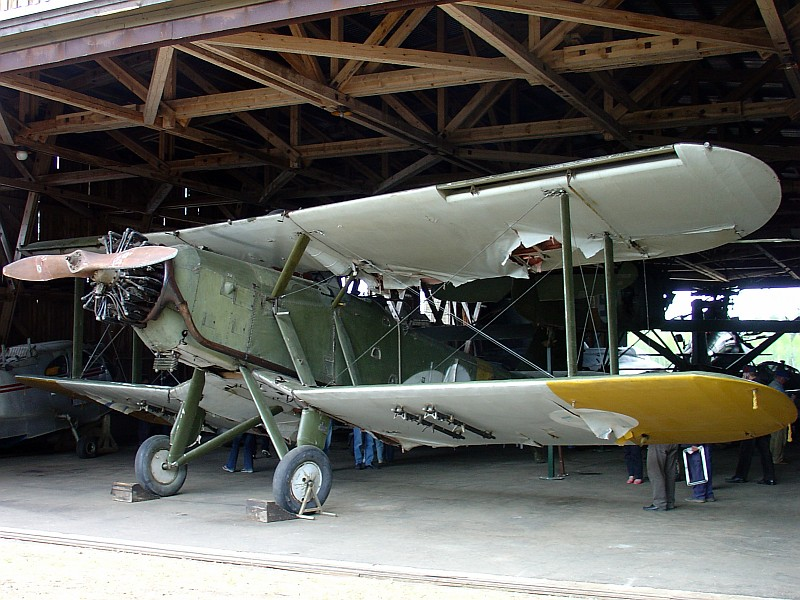
The only preserved Blackburn Ripon, which has an Armstrong Siddeley Panther radial engine. It is stored in the Päijänne Tavastia Aviation Museum in Asikkala, Finland

During 1929, the Ripon entered service with the Fleet Air Arm (FAA), six being operated by No 462 (Fleet Torpedo Bomber) Flight aboard HMS Furious in January of that year. During early 1931, five aircraft were conveyed by the aircraft carrier HMS Eagle to Argentina for use as demonstration aircraft for the British Empire Exhibition in Buenos Aires held in March of that year. Numerous close formation flights were performed by the service's Ripons while off the coast of South America.

In FAA service, it was normally operated in a landplane configuration from the navy's aircraft carriers; although it was capable of being converted to a seaplane, it was rarely fitted with floats in practice. The Ripon continued in service with Torpedo Bomber flights until 1933, when the Fleet Air Arm was reorganised into three larger squadrons, No. 810, No. 811 and No. 812. During January 1935, the last of the FAA's Ripons were withdrawn from service when 811 Naval Air Squadron re-equipped with the more capable Baffin.

The Ripon was also operated by the Finnish Air Force; a single example was produced by Blackburn, while 25 further aircraft were produced under licence at the Finnish Aircraft Factory. These were powered with a number of different radial engines; the pattern aircraft had a 530 hp (400 kW) Bristol Jupiter VII, the next seven had 480 hp (360 kW) Gnome Rhone Jupiter VI, followed by eight series II aircraft with 535 hp (399 kW) Armstrong Siddeley Panther engines and of the ten III series aircraft, first nine had a 580 hp (430 kW) Bristol Pegasus engine, and the last one was equipped with a 650 hp Hispano-Suiza 12Nbr. Finnish Ripons were typically stationed at Turkinsaari, Sortavala, and the island of Santahamina.

The Finnish Air Force deployed its Ripons on active combat missions against the forces of the Soviet Union during both the Winter War and the Continuation War. After the loss of one aircraft to Soviet fighters during late 1939, the Ripon was restricted to normally flying night missions only. It performed a diverse range of missions, including routine reconnaissance flights, U-boat patrols, casualty evacuation, leaflet dropping, and aerial supply operations. On 15 December 1944, the final aircraft was struck off, the Finnish stock having shrunk to a single operational Ripon due to many others having been cannibalised for parts.

A single Ripon, RI-140, was stored and then reassembled and put on display in the Päijänne Tavastia Aviation Museum. It is the only preserved example.

== Variants ==
- Ripon I : Prototype. Two built.
- Ripon II : Initial production - 20 built (Many converted to Mk IICs).
- Ripon IIA : Metal-ribbed wings, with forward-firing machine gun added. - 40 produced.
- Ripon IIC : All-metal wings - 31 produced.
- Ripon III : Prototype with lengthened nose and new tail. One built.
- Ripon IIF Finland : Two-seat reconnaissance, torpedo-bomber aircraft for the Finnish Air Force - 25 produced under license.

== Operators ==
United Kingdom

- Royal Navy
- Fleet Air Arm.

Finland

- Finnish Air Force.

== Specifications (Ripon IIC) ==
Data from The British Bomber, Blackburn Aircraft since 1909

General characteristics

- Crew: 3
- Length: 36 ft 9 in (11.20 m)
- Wingspan: 44 ft 10 in (13.67 m)
- Height: 12 ft 10 in (3.91 m)
- Wing area: 683 sq ft (63.5 m^{2})
- Empty weight: 4,132 lb (1,874 kg)
- Gross weight: 7,282 lb (3,303 kg)
- Powerplant: 1 × Napier Lion X, XI, or XIA W-12 water-cooled piston engine, 570 hp (430 kW)
- Propellers: 2-bladed fixed-pitch propeller

Performance

- Maximum speed: 96 kn (111 mph, 179 km/h) at sea level
- Range: 360 nmi (410 mi, 660 km)
- Service ceiling: 10,000 ft (3,000 m)
- Time to altitude: 6,500 ft (1,981 m) in 15 minutes and 30 seconds

Armament

- Guns:

- 1 × fixed, forward firing .303 in (7.7 mm) Vickers machine gun (not Mk II) and 1 × .303 in (7.7 mm) Lewis gun in rear cockpit.

- Bombs:

- 1 × 18 in (457 mm) torpedo
- up to 3 × 530 lb (240 kg) or 6 × 230 lb (104 kg) bombs.

== See also ==
Related development

- Blackburn Baffin

Related lists

- List of aircraft of World War II
