= Mitsubishi B2M =

Japanese torpedo bomber

B2M
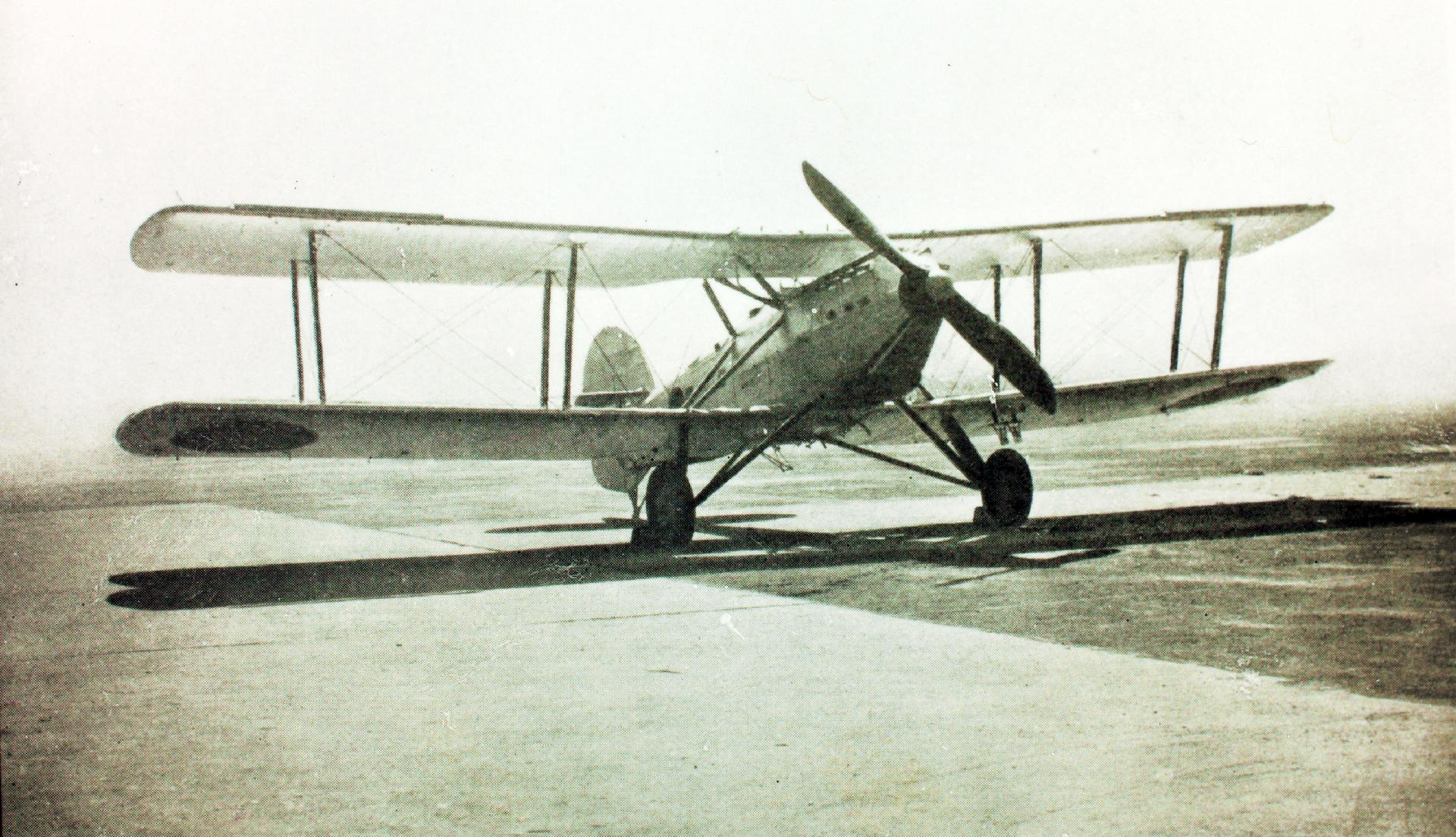

General information
- Type: Torpedo bomber
- Manufacturer: Mitsubishi
- Primary user: Imperial Japanese Navy
- Number built: 206

History
- Introduction date: 1932
- First flight: 28 December 1929
- Developed from: Blackburn Ripon

The Mitsubishi B2M was a Japanese carrier-based torpedo bomber of the 1920s and 1930s. It was built by Mitsubishi to a design by Blackburn Aircraft of Britain and was operated by the Imperial Japanese Navy.

== Design and development ==
In 1927, the Japanese company Mitsubishi commissioned the British aircraft manufacturer Blackburn Aircraft to design an aircraft, which would be built under licence by Mitsubishi if successful, to enter a competition held by the Imperial Japanese Navy for a carrier-based reconnaissance and torpedo bomber to replace its B1M. Blackburn developed a design, the Blackburn T.7B, which was an enlarged development of their Ripon and was under development for Britain's Fleet Air Arm. The T.7B was a three-seat biplane of steel tube construction and with high aspect ratio wings fitted with Handley Page slats, powered by a 466 kW (625 hp) Hispano-Suiza 12Lbr engine.

The design was declared the winner of the competition with a prototype (referred to as the 3MR4) being ordered from Blackburn. This first flew on 28 December 1929 at Blackburn's factory at Brough, Yorkshire and was shipped to Japan in February 1930.

Three development prototypes were built by Mitsubishi in Japan before the aircraft was adopted as the Navy Type 89-1 Model 1 Carrier Attack Plane or Mitsubishi B2M1.

== Operational history ==
The B2M1 entered service with the Imperial Japanese Navy in March 1932, serving aboard the carriers Akagi, Kaga, and Hōshō. Modifications to improve maintainability resulted in the B2M2 or Navy Type 89-2 Carrier Attack Plane, which otherwise showed little improvement in performance over the B2M1. Production of both versions totaled 204 aircraft.

B2Ms were extensively used for high- and low-level bombing attacks against China at the start of the Second Sino-Japanese War in 1937.

== Variants ==
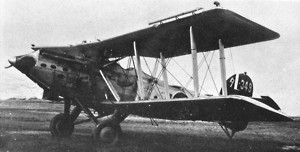
Mitsubishi B2M carrier-based torpedo bomber

Blackburn T.7B
Prototype aircraft built by Blackburn Aircraft.
Mitsubishi 3MR4
Three Japanese-built prototypes.
Mitsubishi B2M1
Initial production aircraft.
Mitsubishi B2M2
Improved production variant with reduced wingspan and modified tail.

== Operators ==
Japan

- Imperial Japanese Navy

== Specifications (B2M1) ==
Data from World Encyclopedia of Military Aircraft

General characteristics

- Crew: 3
- Length: 10.27 m (33 ft 8 in)
- Wingspan: 15.22 m (49 ft 11 in)
- Height: 3.71 m (12 ft 2 in)
- Wing area: 55 m^{2} (590 sq ft)
- Empty weight: 2,670 kg (5,886 lb)
- Gross weight: 3,600 kg (7,937 lb)
- Powerplant: 1 × Hispano-Suiza 12Lbr V-12 water-cooled piston engine, 485 kW (650 hp)

Performance

- Maximum speed: 213 km/h (132 mph, 115 kn)
- Range: 1,779 km (1,105 mi, 961 nmi)
- Service ceiling: 4,500 m (14,800 ft)

Armament

- Guns: 1 × forward firing 7.7 mm (.303 in) machine gun and 1 × flexible 7.7 mm (.303 in) machine gun in rear cockpit
- Bombs: 1 × 800 kg (1,764 lb) torpedo or equivalent weight of bombs

== See also ==
Aircraft of comparable role, configuration, and era

- Blackburn Ripon
- Douglas DT

Related lists

- List of military aircraft of Japan
