= 811 Naval Air Squadron =

Inactive flying squadron of the Royal Navy's Fleet Air Arm

- Squadron badge
- Active: Royal Air Force; 1933–1939; Royal Navy: 1939; 1941–1944; 1945–1947; 1953–1954; 1955–1956
- Disbanded: 16 May 1956
- Country: United Kingdom
- Branch: Royal Navy
- Type: Torpedo Bomber Reconnaissance squadron
- Role: Carrier-based: anti-submarine warfare (ASW); anti-surface warfare (ASuW); Close air support (CAS)
- Part of: Fleet Air Arm
- Mottos: Ventre à mer (French for '[a corruption of Ventre à terre] At full speed')
- Aircraft: See Aircraft flown section for full list.
- Engagements: World War II: European theatre of World War II; Battle of the Atlantic; Arctic convoys of World War II; Malayan Emergency
- Battle honours: English Channel 1942; North Sea 1942; Atlantic 1943–44; Arctic 1944

Insignia
- Squadron Badge Description: White, over three bars wavy blue a swordfish also blue (1937)
- Identification Markings: 4-16 (Ripon/Baffin); 601-614 (Baffin January 1935, Swordfish); U4A+ (Swordfish May 1939); single letters (Chesapeake, Swordfish from November 19.41); 1A+ (Swordfish later); single letters (Martlet/Wildcat); FD4A+ (Mosquito); 100-116 (Sea Fury); 158-169 (Sea Hawk); 240-251 (Sea Hawk January 1956)
- Fin Carrier Codes: J (Sea Fury); C (Sea Hawk)

811 Naval Air Squadron (811 NAS), sometimes expressed as 811 Squadron, is an inactive Fleet Air Arm (FAA) naval air squadron of the United Kingdom's Royal Navy (RN). It most recently operated the Hawker Sea Hawk FB 3 jet fighter bomber between March 1955 and May 1956, with its last deployment with the lead ship of her class HMS Centaur, to the Far East.

It was first founded in 1933, and served during Second World War, seeing action in the Battle of the Atlantic and on Russian convoys. During its service with the Royal Air Force (RAF), the squadron utilised aircraft such as the Blackburn Ripon, Blackburn Baffin, and Fairey Swordfish. After its transfer to the Royal Navy and throughout the Second World War, it operated the Hawker Sea Hurricane and Vought Chesapeake, subsequently moving to the Grumman Wildcat. Notably, it was the sole front-line Fleet Air Arm (FAA) squadron to operate the de Havilland Mosquito and the de Havilland Sea Mosquito, which was active from 1945 to 1947. Additionally, the squadron flew the Hawker Sea Fury during the years 1953 and 1954.

== Service history ==
=== Interwar (1933-1939) ===
The squadron was formed at RAF Gosport, Hampshire, on 3 April 1933 by amalgamating No. 465 and No. 466 (Fleet Torpedo) Flights, and served aboard the aircraft carrier HMS Furious in the Home Fleet. Initially equipped with Blackburn Ripon Mk.II torpedo bomber aircraft, these were replaced in January 1935 with Blackburn Baffin torpdeo bombers, which were in turn replaced by Fairey Swordfish Mk.I torpedo bombers in October 1936.

In December 1938 HMS Furious was paid off, and the next year 811 Squadron was assigned to her sister ship HMS Courageous. The squadron was one of the units that were transferred to the Admiralty when it assumed control of the FAA on 24 May 1939., however, it disbanded on the same day at RNAS Donibristle (HMS Merlin), Fife, merging with 822 Squadron to form 767 Naval Air Squadron.

In the interim, a new sub-unit was established on 15 May 1939 at RNAS Eastleigh, Southampton, initially referred to as 811A Squadron. Following the redesignation of the original 811 Squadron, this Flight assumed its designation.

=== World War II (1939-1945) ===
At the onset of the war, it was reassigned to HMS Courageous; however, it ceased to exist following the sinking of the carrier. The squadron lost much of its personnel and all of its aircraft when HMS Courageous was sunk by a U-boat on 17 September 1939, and the survivors of 811 and 822 Squadrons were reformed into 815 Naval Air Squadron.

811 Squadron was reformed in July 1941 at RNAS Lee-on-Solent (HMS Daedalus), near Portsmouth, as a torpedo-bomber reconnaissance squadron, and was equipped with two Hawker Sea Hurricanes and fourteen American Vought SB2U Vindicators, which the British called the "Chesapeake". The squadron also received two former civilian Avro 652s (the precursor to the Avro Anson) which they operated until March 1942. The Chesapeake's were part of an order originally placed by the French Navy in March 1940, but after the fall of France the order was taken over by the British. The aircraft were fitted with an additional fuel tank and armour, and the single French 7.5 mm Darne machine gun was replaced by four British machine guns. It was intended that they be used as anti-submarine patrol aircraft operating from the escort carrier Archer, but it was soon realised that the Chesapeake lacked the power to fly from such a small vessel while carrying a useful load, and they were reassigned to training squadrons in November 1941, and the squadron received Swordfish Mk.2's as replacements.

From August to December 1942 811 Squadron was based at RAF Bircham Newton in Norfolk, serving under the control of RAF Coastal Command, and flying on anti-shipping and mine-laying operations. In January 1943, the squadron received three Grumman Wildcat Mk.IVs, called the "Martlet" in British service, and on 21 February 1943 flew from RNAS Hatston, to embark aboard the escort carrier Biter to serve on convoy escort duty in the battle of the Atlantic. On 22 April Biter and the escort destroyers Pathfinder, Obdurate, and Opportune joined convoy ONS-4 sailing from Liverpool. On 25 April a Swordfish from 811 Squadron attacked U-203, which was then sunk by depth charges by Pathfinder. The convoy arrived at Halifax, Nova Scotia, on 5 April without loss.

From 2 May Biter defended the convoys HX 237 and SC 129 from German wolf packs. On 12 May a Swordfish from 811 Squadron, with the destroyer Broadway and the frigate Lagan, attacked and sank U-89. After arriving at Liverpool, the squadron disembarked and were stationed at RNAS Machrihanish.

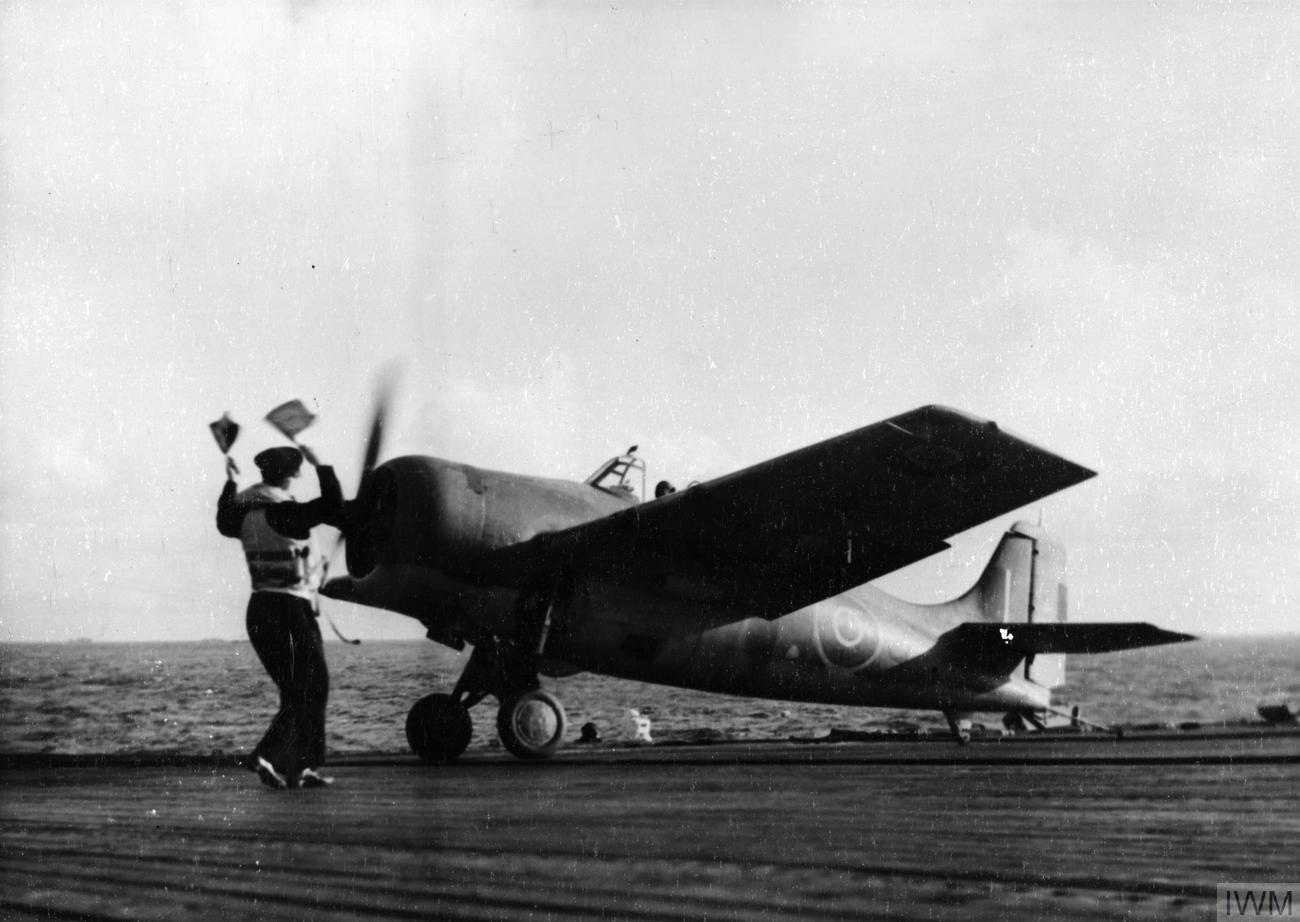
A Grumman Martlet fighter of 811 Squadron lands on HMS Biter after a successful action against a German Junkers Ju 290, February 1944

On 2 June 811 Squadron returned to Biter to escort further convoys between Liverpool and Halifax, including ON-207 in October. While at Naval Station Argentia in November, the squadron was supplied with the new American acoustic torpedo, codenamed the Mark 24 mine, but commonly known as "FIDO". On 17 November a Swordfish smashed into the end of the flight deck of Biter while landing in a heavy swell, and its unused FIDO torpedo fell into the sea and exploded, badly damaging Biter's rudder. The carrier managed to return to Rosyth Dockyard for repairs, which took a month.

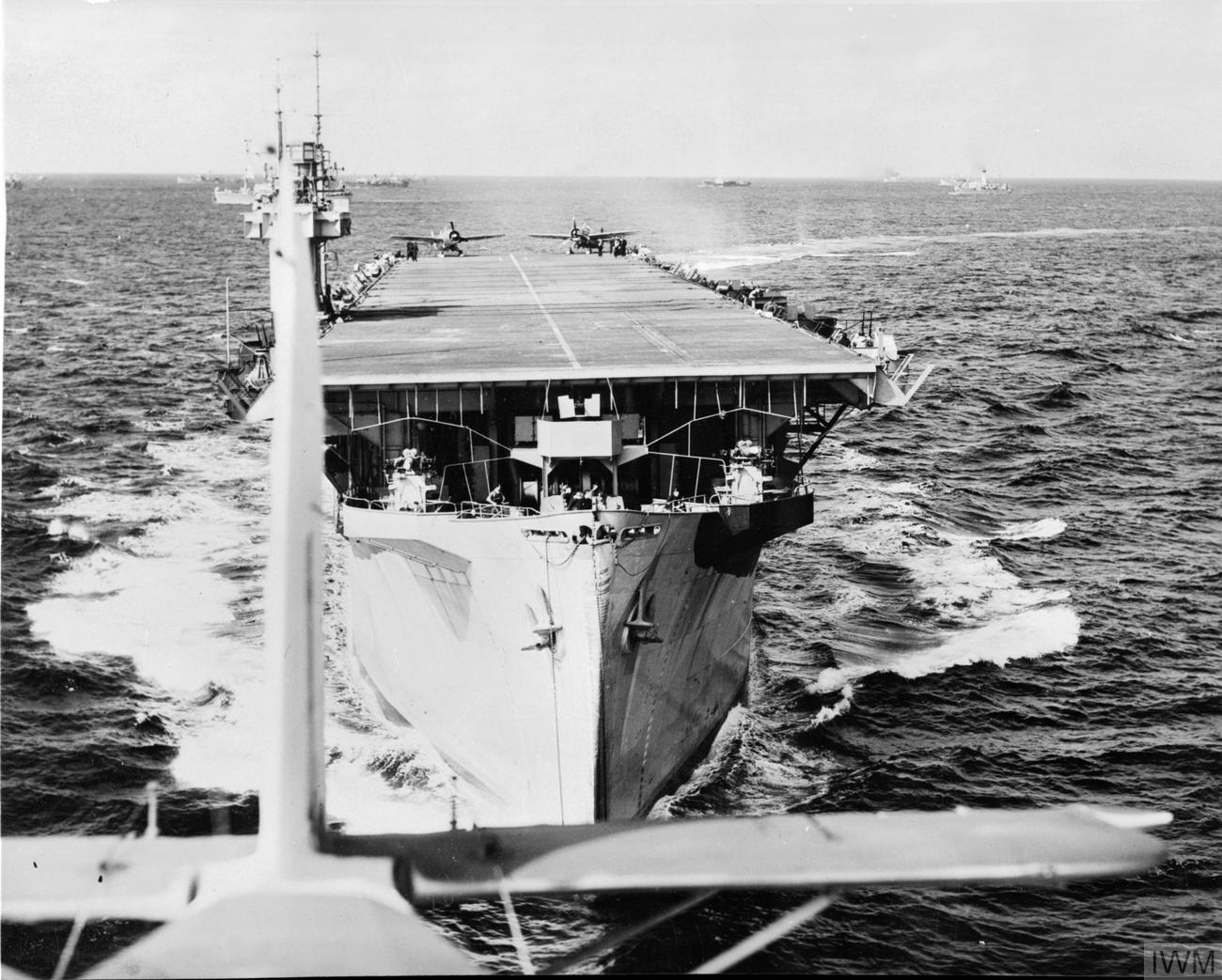
View of HMS Biter from a Swordfish just after takeoff. Ready on the deck are two Martlet fighters, and in the distance other ships of the convoy, March 1944.

While Biter was under repair 811 Squadron were stationed at RNAS Inskip, finally returning to the ship on 12 January 1944. In early February Biter sailed in support of Convoy ONS-29 to Halifax, then transferred to Convoy OS-68/KMS-42 bound for Freetown and Gibraltar. On 16 February, in the Bay of Biscay, 811's Martlets shot down a Ju 290 long-range reconnaissance aircraft, which had attempted to attack the convoy escorts with a glide bomb. Biter arrived at Gibraltar on 25 February where two Swordfish of 811 Squadron spent a week operating out of RAF North Front. On 2 March Biter sailed again, escorting the UK-bound convoys SL-150 and MKS-41, and arrived at Liverpool on the 13th. Biter continued to escort convoys between the UK and Gibraltar until August 1944 when she was withdrawn from service, for conversion to a transport carrier.

811 Squadron was temporarily based at RAF Limavady in Northern Ireland, serving under RAF Coastal Command, until joining Vindex in September 1944 to escort convoys to Russia. 811 Squadron was disbanded on its return in December 1944.

=== Mosquito / Sea Mosquito (1945-1947) ===
811 Squadron was reformed at RNAS Ford (HMS Peregrine), Sussex, on 15 September 1945, and was equipped with Mosquito FB Mk.VIs. The de Havilland Mosquito FB Mk.VI fighter-bomber was introduced into service with the Fleet Air Arm (FAA) when it was assigned to the newly re-established 811 Squadron at RNAS Ford. It continued to operate from land bases, as it was not designed for carrier operations.

Three of these were promptly withdrawn, and the rest were substituted with twelve Sea Mosquito TR Mk.33s starting in April 1946, the FB Mk.VIs having provided 811 Squadron with the necessary Mosquito experience prior to transitioning to the de Havilland Sea Mosquito. An early prototype, flown by test pilot Eric Brown, was the first twin-engined aircraft to make a carrier landing, when it touched down aboard HMS Indefatigable on 25 March 1944. The Sea Mosquito was developed to fulfil the criteria outlined in the Admiralty's Specification N.15/44, which was the initial specification issued for a twin-engine aircraft designed for carrier operations. The Sea Mosquito TR Mk.33s were first deployed by the FAA, replacing the Mosquito FB Mk.VIs of 811 Squadron.

Stationed at RNAS Brawdy (HMS Goldcrest), Pembrokeshire, 811 Squadron was the only unit to operate this type, which never served aboard a carrier, before it was superseded by the de Havilland Sea Hornet. The squadron was disbanded in July 1947.

=== Sea Fury (1953-1954) ===
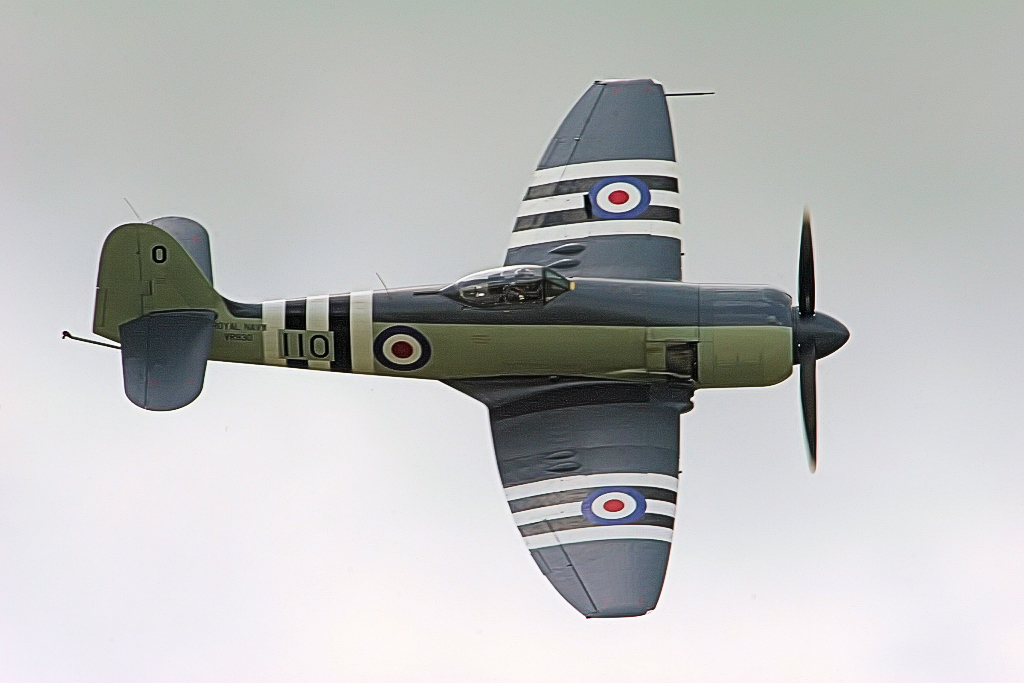
Hawker Sea Fury; an example of the type used by 811 Squadron

In August 1953, 811 Squadron was reformed at RNAS Arbroath (HMS Condor), Angus, starting with nine Sea Fury FB.11 aircraft, which was subsequently increased to twelve.

The Hawker Sea Fury marked the last piston-engine fighter employed by the Fleet Air Arm in active squadrons, serving from 1947 until 1955. It was distinguished as the first British naval aircraft to incorporate power-folding wings in routine operations. The Sea Fury began its operational service in the late summer of 1947.

In February 1954, the squadron boarded the Colossus-class light fleet carrier HMS Warrior for a journey to the Mediterranean. By the time the squadron navigated through the Suez Canal two months later, two additional aircraft had been incorporated. Their route included stops at Aden and Singapore. In May, the squadron conducted operational strikes against Malaysian bandit positions in the Johore Baru region, followed by exercises off the coasts of Korea and Japan in June and July. The squadron returned home via South Africa and officially disbanded at RNAS Ford on 30 December.

=== Sea Hawk (1955-1956) ===
811 Squadron was reformed at RNAS Lossiemouth (HMS Fulmar), Moray, on 14 March 1955 with an initial complement of Sea Hawk FB3 jets. The Hawker Sea Hawk was initially introduced to FAA squadrons in 1953, with the FB3 variant, designed as a fighter bomber, making its inaugural flight on 13 March 1954 and the FGA 4 variant, designed for close air support (CAS) operations, making its inaugural flight on 26 August 1954.

Originally designated for the lead ship of her class HMS Centaur, the squadron was instead deployed on sister ship HMS Bulwark in June for a visit to Sweden. In October, the aircraft participated in exercises aboard another sister ship HMS Albion and in January 1956, they finally joined HMS Centaur, embarking on a journey to the Far East via the Suez Canal. Following a series of exercises and demonstrations over Karachi, Bombay, Colombo, Hong Kong, and Singapore, the squadron returned to the United Kingdom and was disbanded upon arrival on 16 May 1956.

== Aircraft flown ==
The squadron has flown a number of different aircraft types, including:

- Blackburn Ripon IIC torpedo bomber (April 1933 - January 1935)
- Blackburn Baffin torpedo bomber (November 1934 - November 1936)
- Fairey Swordfish I torpedo bomber (October 1936 - September 1939)
- Avro Tutor trainer aircraft (January - May 1937)
- Hawker Sea Hurricane fighter aircraft (July - November 1941)
- Vought Chesapeake dive bomber (July - November 1941)
- Avro 652 light airliner (July 1941 - March 1942)
- Fairey Swordfish II torpedo bomber (November 1941 - December 1944)
- Grumman Martlet Mk IV fighter aircraft (January 1943 - April 1944)
- Grumman Wildcat Mk V fighter aircraft (March - September 1944)
- Fairey Swordfish III torpedo bomber (July - December 1944)
- Gruman Wildcat Mk Vl fighter aircraft (September - December 1944)
- de Havilland Mosquito FB Mk.VI fighter-bomber (September 1945 - August 1946)
- de Havilland Sea Mosquito TR Mk.33 torpedo-bomber (April 1946 - July 1947)
- Hawker Sea Fury FB.11 fighter-bomber (August 1953 - December 1954)
- Hawker Sea Hawk FGA 4 jet fighter/ground attack aircraft (March - May 1955)
- Hawker Sea Hawk FB 3 jet fighter bomber (March 1955 - May 1956)

== Battle honours ==
The following Battle Honours have been awarded to 811 Naval Air Squadron:

- English Channel 1942
- North Sea 1942
- Atlantic 1943–44
- Arctic 1944

== Commanding officers ==
List of commanding officers of 811 Naval Air Squadron:

1933 - 1939

- Squadron Leader T.A. Warne-Browne, DSC, RAF, from 8 May 1933
- Lieutenant Commander F.W.H. Clarke, RN, (Squadron Leader, RAF), from 2 October 1933
- Lieutenant Commander E.B. Carnduff, RN, (Squadron Leader, RAF), from 27 December 1934
- Commander R.R. Graham, RN, (Squadron Leader, RAF), from 23 September 1935
- Lieutenant Commander L.G. Richardson, RN, (Squadron Leader, RAF), from 27 February 1936
- Flight Lieutenant J.A.S. Brown, RAF, from 12 December 1937
- Lieutenant Commander E.O.F. Price, RN, (Squadron Leader, RAF), from 21 January 1938
- disbanded - 24 May 1939

1939

- Lieutenant Commander S. Borrett, RN, from 15 May 1939
- disbanded - 17 September 1939

1941 - 1944

- Lieutenant Commander R.D. Wall, RN, from 15 July 1941
- Lieutenant Commander W.J. Lucas, RN, from 29 October 1941
- Lieutenant Commander H.S. Hayes, DSC, RN, from 27 February 1942
- Lieutenant J.G. Baldwin, RN, from 28 January 1943
- Lieutenant A.S. Kennard, DSC, RN, from 12 April 1943 (Lieutenant Commander 30 June 1943)
- Lieutenant Commander E.B. Morgan, RANVR, from 29 November 1943
- Lieutenant Commander(A) E.E.G. Emsley, RNVR, from 27 July 1944
- disbanded - 9 December 1944

1945 - 1947

- Lieutenant Commander(A) S.M.P. Walsh, DSC & Bar, RNVR, from 15 September 1945
- Lieutenant Commander(A) E.W. Lockwood, RN, from 24 June 1946
- Lieutenant F.M.M. Lewis, RN, from 24 April 1947
- Lieutenant Commander(A) D.H. Richards, RN, from 1 May 1947
- disbanded - 1 June 1947

1953 - 1954

- Lieutenant Commander L.G. Morris, RN, from 17 August 1953
- disbanded - 30 December 1954

1955 - 1956

- Lieutenant Commander R.H. Reynolds, DSC, AFC, RN, from 14 March 1955
- disbanded - 16 May 1956

Note: Abbreviation (A) signifies Air Branch of the RN or RNVR.

== See also ==
- Mervyn Williams - Royal Air Force Group Captain and former pilot of 811 Squadron during 1933 to 1934.
