= Avro 571 Buffalo =

Prototype British carrier-based torpedo bomber biplane

Type 571 Buffalo
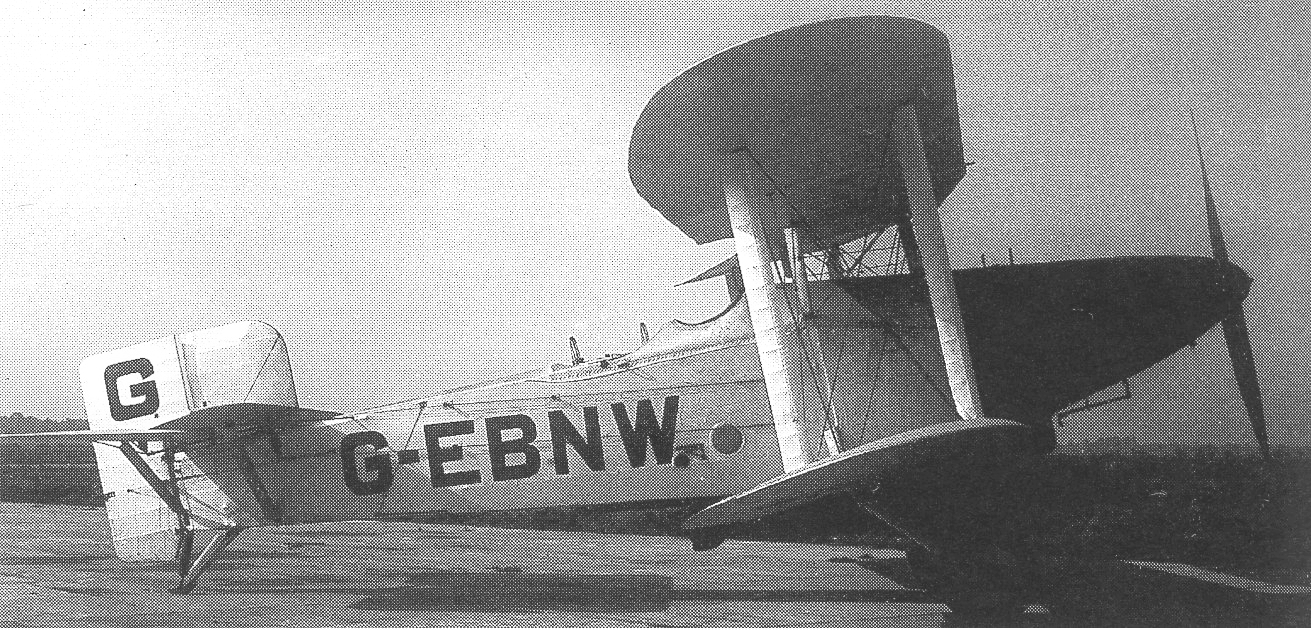

General information
- Type: Torpedo Bomber
- Manufacturer: Avro
- Status: Prototype
- Number built: 1

History
- First flight: 1926

The Avro 571 Buffalo was a prototype British carrier-based torpedo bomber biplane, designed and built by Avro in the 1920s. It was not selected for service, the Blackburn Ripon being ordered instead.

== Design and development ==
The Avro 571 Buffalo was designed by Avro as a private venture to meet the requirements of Air Ministry Specification 21/23, for a two-seat torpedo bomber and reconnaissance aircraft, intended to replace the Blackburn Dart. The prototype (G-EBNW) first flew at the Avro works at Hamble during 1926. It was evaluated against the Blackburn Ripon and the Handley Page Harrow, but was found to have poor handling and was therefore rejected.

The prototype was therefore rebuilt as the Avro 572 Buffalo II, with new, all-metal wings, fitted with controllable Handley Page slats and a more powerful engine. In this form, the Buffalo was much improved. By this time however, the Ripon had been declared the competition winner.

== Operational history ==
After it failed to be ordered into production, the Buffalo was converted into a seaplane in 1928 for the Air Ministry. As serial number N239, it was used for trials at the Marine Aircraft Experimental Establishment at Felixstowe.

== Variants ==
Avro 571 Buffalo I
Prototype powered by 450 hp (340 kW) Napier Lion Va engine.
Avro 572 Buffalo II
Rebuilt Buffalo I with new wing and powered by 530 hp (400 kW) Lion XIA.

== Operators ==
United Kingdom

- Air Ministry

== Specifications (Buffalo II) ==
Data from Avro Aircraft since 1908.

General characteristics

- Crew: 2
- Length: 37 ft 3 in (11.35 m)
- Wingspan: 46 ft 0 in (14.02 m)
- Height: 14 ft 0 in (4.27 m)
- Wing area: 684 sq ft (63.5 m^{2})
- Empty weight: 4,233 lb (1,920 kg)
- Gross weight: 7,430 lb (3,370 kg)
- Powerplant: 1 × Napier Lion XIA W-12 water-cooled piston engine, 530 hp (400 kW)
- Propellers: 2-bladed fixed-pitch propeller

Performance

- Maximum speed: 135 mph (217 km/h, 117 kn)
- Cruise speed: 105 mph (169 km/h, 91 kn)
- Range: 650 mi (1,050 km, 560 nmi)
- Service ceiling: 13,700 ft (4,200 m)
- Rate of climb: 770 ft/min (3.9 m/s)
- Wing loading: 10.9 lb/sq ft (53 kg/m^{2})
- Power/mass: 0.071 hp/lb (0.117 kW/kg)

Armament

- Guns:

- 1 × fixed, forward firing 0.303 in (7.7 mm) Vickers machine gun (not Mk II) and 1 × 0.303 in (7.7 mm) Lewis Gun in rear cockpit

- Bombs:

- 1 × 18 in (457 mm) torpedo

or

- up to 3 × 520 lb (236 kg) bombs

== See also ==
Aircraft of comparable role, configuration, and era

- Blackburn Ripon
- Handley Page Harrow
