= Pemberton-Billing P.B.1 =

1910s British flying boat

- The P.B. 1 on display at the Olympia Exhibition, London in March 1914

General information
- Type: Single-seat flying boat
- National origin: United Kingdom
- Manufacturer: Pemberton-Billing Limited
- Designer: Noel Pemberton-Billing
- Status: dismantled
- Number built: 1

History
- First flight: 1914 (although it may never have flown)

The Pemberton-Billing P.B.1, (Note: Pemberton Billing aircraft underwent a retrospective redesignation in 1916, with the original P.B.1 design, as displayed at Olympia, redesignated P.B.7, and the modified aircraft as tested during May–June 1914 redesignated P.B.9. The P.B.9 landplane scout, which was built in August 1914 using the engine of the P.B.1 became the P.B.13 as part of the same redesignation.) sometimes known as the Supermarine, was a 1910s British single-seat flying-boat built by Pemberton-Billing Limited, which later became the Supermarine Aviation Works. Only one P.B.1 was built, and it never flew any distance further than a hop.

== Design and development ==
The P.B.1 was a single-seat open cockpit biplane powered by a 50 hp (36 kW) Gnome rotary engine driving a three-bladed pusher propeller, which was mounted in a tractor configuration nacelle between the upper wings and the fuselage. It had a single-step hull designed by the naval architect Linton Hope, with a spruce skin over a mahogany structure, and covered with waterproof fabric. It had two-bay wings constructed of spruce and Ash, with ailerons on the upper wing and floats under the lower wingtips. The pilot sat in a cockpit aft of the wing trailing edge.

Described as "a boat that will fly, [instead of] an aeroplane that will float", only one P.B.1 was built; the prototype was displayed at the Olympia Aero Show in March 1914. It was rebuilt during April 1914, with the pilot's cockpit moved forward to the nose of the aircraft, and the Gnome engine mounted on top of the fuselage, driving two 3-bladed pusher propellers via chain drives. Following the modifications, the P.B.1 entered testing, but failed to achieve flight during testing on Southampton Water on 30 May 1914. Noel Pemberton Billing, the head of Pemberton-Billing Limited and designer of the PB.1, claimed that the aircraft made a short hop during June, but other sources state that the PB.1 never flew.

Following the conclusion of the attempted flight testing, the P.B.1 was dismantled on 28 July 1914, with its engine being used in the Pemberton-Billing P.B.9 single seat scout aircraft.

== Specifications (P.B.1) ==
Data from British Flying Boats

General characteristics

- Crew: 1
- Wingspan: 30 ft 0 in (9.14 m)
- Wing area: 293 sq ft (27.2 m^{2})
- Empty weight: 750 lb (340 kg)
- Gross weight: 970 lb (440 kg)
- Powerplant: 1 × Gnome rotary , 50 hp (37 kW)

Performance

- Maximum speed: 50 mph (80 km/h, 43 kn) (estimated)

== See also ==
Related lists

- List of flying boats and floatplanes
