= Supermarine Type 525 =

1950s British prototype fighter aircraft

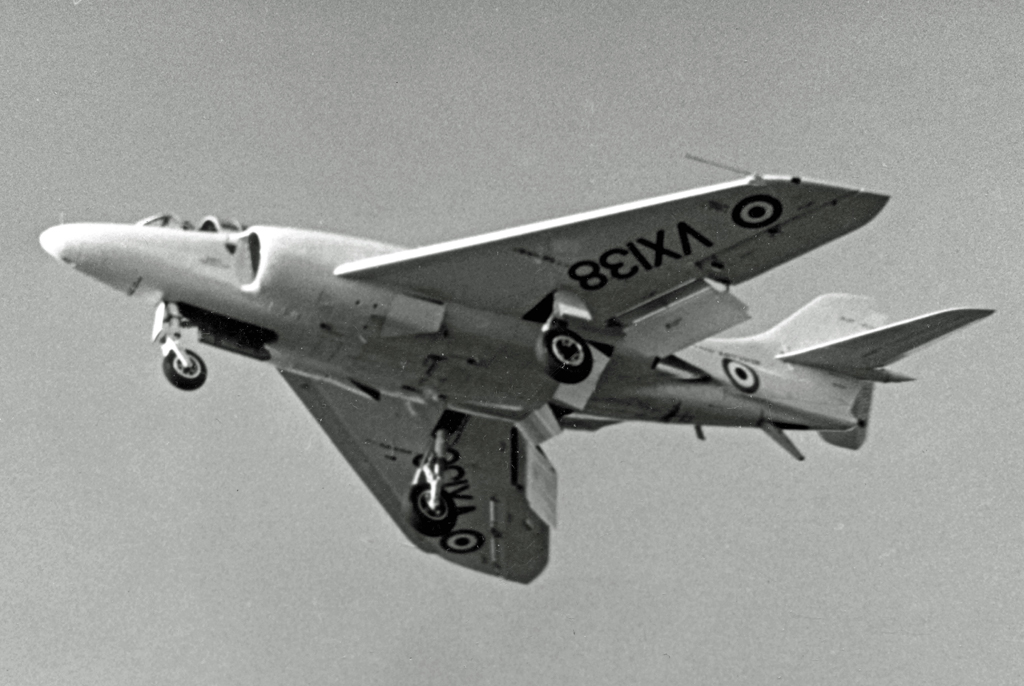
- The Type 525 demonstrating at the 1954 Farnborough air show

General information
- Type: Prototype naval fighter
- National origin: United Kingdom
- Manufacturer: Supermarine
- Status: Crashed 5 July 1955
- Number built: 1

History
- First flight: 27 April 1954
- Developed from: Supermarine 508
- Developed into: Supermarine Scimitar

The Supermarine Type 525 was a British prototype naval jet fighter aircraft of the 1950s.

== Design and development ==
The Type 525 was a late development of the Type 508 of which three examples had been ordered from Supermarine in November 1947 to Air Ministry specification N.9/47. The Type 508s were to be development aircraft for a carrier-borne interceptor, reconnaissance and low-level nuclear strike aircraft to be built later by Supermarine to specification N.113D and which became the Type 544 which entered service as the Scimitar.

The first Type 508, serial VX133, was a straight-winged jet aircraft fitted with a V-tail ("butterfly") tail intended for use with rubber deck landing techniques, the choice of wide, flattish fuselage and V-tail being designed to provide adequate stability and clearance when landing without a normal undercarriage. It first flew on 31 August 1951. The second Type 508 VX136 was fairly similar to the first aircraft but was redesignated as the Type 529 and first flew on 29 August 1952.

The third Type 508 VX138, built like the others at Supermarine's Hursley Park experimental department, was modified on the production line to closer to Scimitar standards and was redesignated the Type 525. This aircraft was delivered by road to the Aeroplane and Armament Experimental Establishment (A&AEE) at Boscombe Down, Wiltshire, on 25 April 1954. It made its first flight on 27 April 1954 at the hands of Supermarine's test pilot M J Lithgow.

The Type 525 was powered by two Rolls-Royce Avon turbojets and fitted with a taller tricycle undercarriage positioned further out on the wings than on the Type 508. It had a conventional tail and rudder surfaces and swept wings. It made its first public appearance at the September 1954 Farnborough Airshow.

== Operational history ==
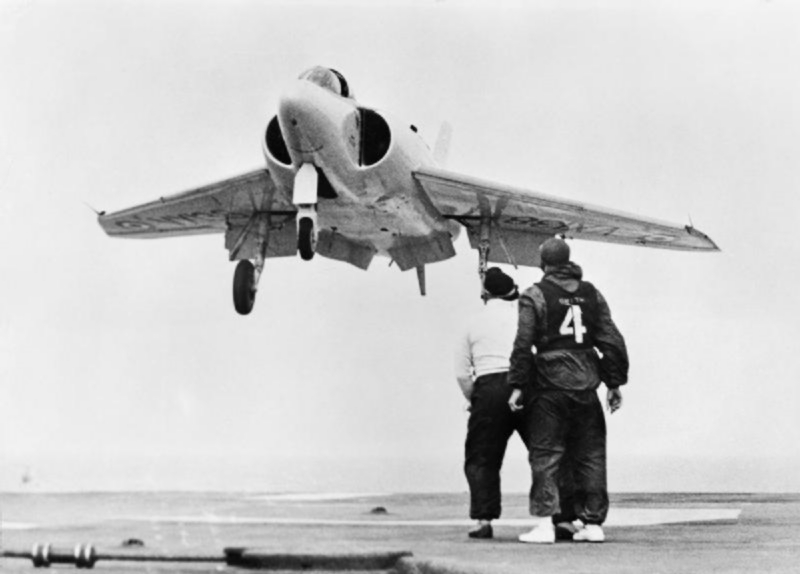
Supermarine 525 prototype (VX138) landing aboard the Royal Navy aircraft carrier HMS Centaur (R06), 14 June 1955. The aircraft crashed just three weeks later after the pilot was unable to recover from a flat spin.

The aircraft made further test flights during late 1954 from its base at Chilbolton airfield, Hampshire. In early 1955 it was taken by road to the Hursley Park factory for the installation of a flap blowing system. This was designed to reduce the safe landing approach speed, an obvious advantage for safe operation from aircraft carriers. It also lowered the speed at which catapult launches would be carried out.

The flap blowing system ("super-circulation") on the Type 525 used a device to project a thin jet of high pressure air, bled from an engine compressor, through a narrow slot along the wing trailing edge just ahead of the flap hinges. The Coandă effect then bent the jet of air over the flaps. The improved lift resulted in an 18 mph reduction in approach speed - most useful for carrier-based aircraft.

After returning to Chilbolton by road, the aircraft was flown to the A&AEE on 5 July 1955 for further trials. The aircraft was tested for low speed handling on 5 July. Whilst at 10,000 ft (3,000 m), and unable to recover from a flat spin 20 minutes after take-off, the aircraft spun in from 3,000 ft (910 m) two miles south-southeast of Boscombe Down. It was destroyed by fire and the pilot Lieutenant Commander T.A. Rickell, who had ejected just before the crash, died of injuries sustained. The first Type 544 Scimitar prototype embodied experience from the Type 525, and first flew on 19 January 1956.

== Operators ==
- Supermarine (Vickers-Armstrong)
- Aeroplane and Armament Experimental Establishment

== Specifications (Type 525) ==
Data from The British Fighter since 1912

General characteristics

- Crew: 1
- Length: 55 ft 0 in (16.76 m)
- Wingspan: 38 ft 6 in (11.73 m)
- Gross weight: 19,910 lb (9,031 kg)
- Max takeoff weight: 28,169 lb (12,777 kg)
- Powerplant: 2 × Rolls-Royce Avon R.A.3 turbojet, 6,500 lbf (29 kN) thrust each

Performance

- Maximum speed: 647 mph (1,041 km/h, 562 kn) at 30,000 ft (9,140 m)
- Maximum speed: Mach 0.954
- Service ceiling: 42,600 ft (13,000 m)
