= Supermarine Type 324 =

General information
- Type: Fighter
- Designer: Supermarine
- Status: proposed design not accepted

The Supermarine Type 324 and Type 325 were British two-engined fighter designs proposed as the replacement for the Supermarine Spitfire and Hawker Hurricane. Neither of them nor a revised design - the Type 327 - to carry cannon was accepted for development and production.

== Development ==
As an aircraft to succeed the Hurricane and Spitfire then entering service, Air Ministry specification F.18/37 required a 400+ mph (at 15,000 ft) fighter with twelve .303 inch machine gun armament. Hawker Aircraft submitted a single seat, single engine design with two possible engines, the Hawker Tornado powered by the Rolls-Royce Vulture and the Hawker Typhoon, with Napier Sabre engine.

Gloster submitted two similar twin-boom designs with 12 Browning machine guns in the nose and a pusher Sabre engine as well as an adaptation of their proposal to F.9/37 with nose-mounted armament. Bristol's design was one airframe offered with three alternative engines.

In 1938 Supermarine submitted brochures describing the Type 324 (under the company specification No.458) along with the Type 325. Both were compact twin-engine designs - one tractor and one pusher - with either Rolls-Royce Merlin or Bristol Taurus engines.

Hawker's designs - which Sydney Camm had been working on since April 1937 - were accepted and prototypes of each ordered.

== Overview ==
The Type 324 was a low-wing, twin-engined monoplane featuring the elliptical wing shape of the Spitfire, with retractable tricycle undercarriage.

Twin engines were expected to give a maximum speed of 450 mph maximum. In addition, the twin layout gave the usual advantages of torque cancellation, improved pilot view, tricycle landing gear, performance, improved take-off performance and allowed the use of the proven Merlin engine.

The structure of the aircraft was Alclad aluminium alloy. The wing was designed in sections, so that alternative engines (Taurus) or armament could be accommodated. Fowler flaps were fitted for take-off/landing. Spoiler flaps were fitted to improve performance.

A number of armament types were considered. The main was 12 Browning in two packs of six in each wing outer section; these could be removed complete with ammunition to allow rapid rearming and servicing of the weapons.

When the Air Ministry felt progress on the Westland Whirlwind cannon-armed fighter was too slow, they asked for the F.18/37 tenders to be revised with 20mm cannon armament. Supermarine dropped the pusher design and proposed a six-cannon fighter as the Type 327. The Ministry did not feel its advantages outweighed other considerations, and that the Whirlwind - or the adaption of the Bristol Beaufort - would enter service before Supermarine's design could.

== Powerplant ==
Rolls-Royce Merlin Max speed: 450 mph Cruise speed at 15000 ft: 195 mph

== Measurements ==
Span 41 ft x 40 ft Root Chord 9mm x 9 ft Mean Chord 7.08mm x 7.08 ft Length 31.5 ft x 33.5 ft Height 10.2 ft x 9.75 ft
