= Supermarine Scimitar =

British naval fighter-bomber aircraft from the Cold War era

Scimitar
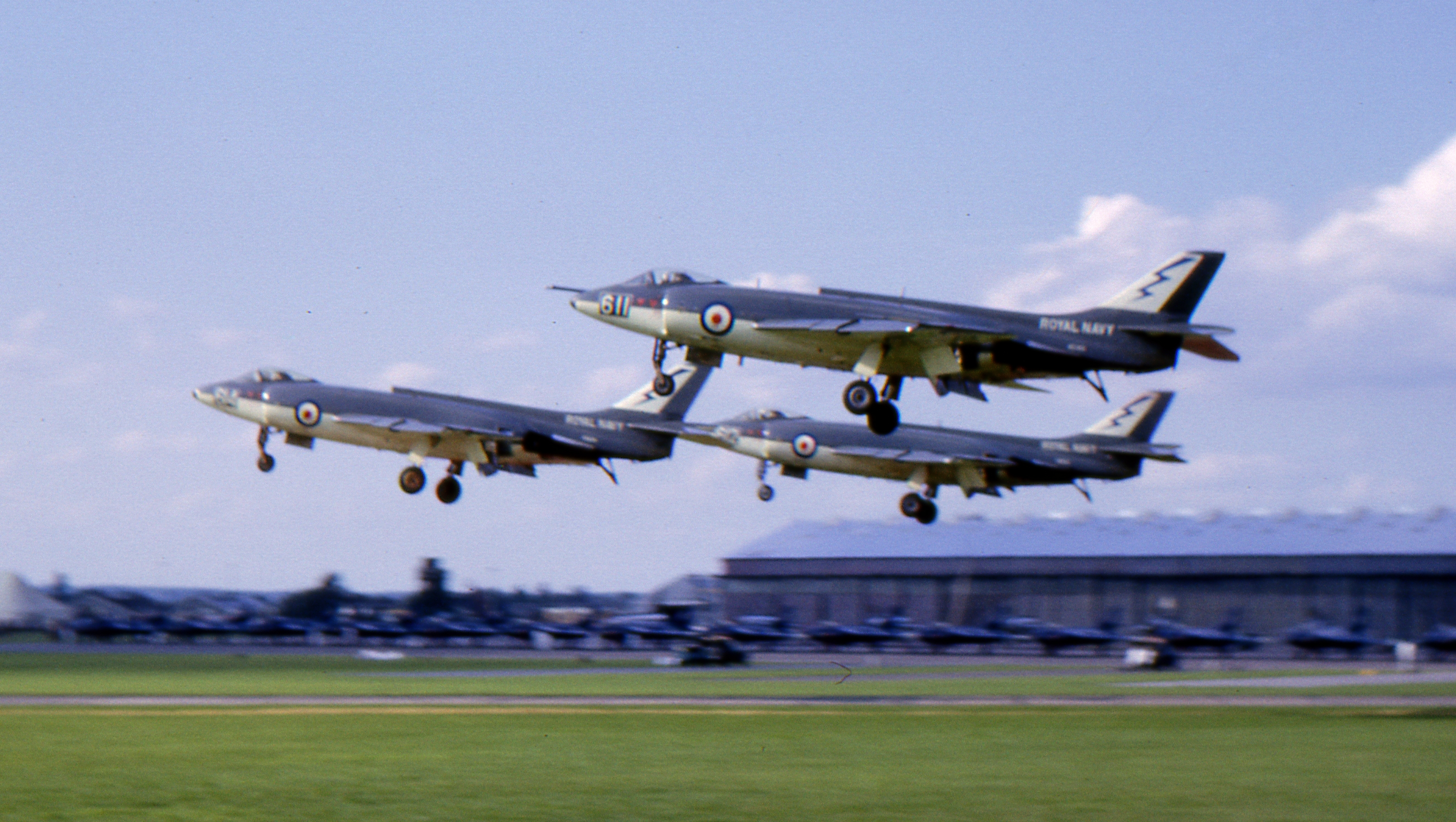
- Scimitars of 736 Naval Air Squadron at Farnborough, 1962

General information
- Type: Naval strike fighter
- National origin: United Kingdom
- Manufacturer: Supermarine
- Status: Retired
- Primary user: Royal Navy
- Number built: 76

History
- Introduction date: 1957
- First flight: 19 January 1956
- Retired: 1969

The Supermarine Scimitar was a British single-seat naval strike fighter aircraft. Operated exclusively by the Royal Navy's Fleet Air Arm, it was the final aircraft to be entirely designed and manufactured by Supermarine.

The Scimitar was developed out of an earlier effort, internally designated Type 505, an undercarriage-less fighter aircraft intended to be flown from rubber decks. Much of the aircraft's features, including its unorthodox V-tail (or "butterfly tail") and its thin straight wing, were shared with this ancestor; however, the Admiralty reconsidered their requirements and specified a conventional undercarriage be used. Accordingly, Supermarine produced the closely related Type 508, equipped with an enlarged wing and retractable undercarriage. On 31 August 1951, the Type 508 performed its maiden flight, it was closely followed by the redesigned Type 529 and Type 544, the latter serving as a direct prototype for the production model, making its first flight in January 1956.

During 1957, the first production aircraft were delivered, enabling the Scimitar to enter service with the Royal Navy during the following year. The aircraft was operated by the Royal Navy as a low level strike aircraft, which included potentially being armed with nuclear weapons, having been superseded as a fighter even prior to its introduction by other aircraft such as the de Havilland Sea Venom and the de Havilland Sea Vixen. It experienced a relatively high attrition rate due to a spate of accidents. Towards its latter years of operation, the type was frequently used as an aerial refuelling tanker. During 1969, the Scimitar was permanently withdrawn, having been replaced in service by newer and more capable aircraft such as the Blackburn Buccaneer.

== Design and development ==
=== Background ===
The Scimitar stemmed from a number of designs produced by Supermarine for a naval jet aircraft. Work on what would eventually lead to the Scimitar officially commenced in 1945 following the release of a requirement for an undercarriage-less fighter aircraft, which was intended to land on flexible "sprung" rubber decks. At the time it was commonly believed amongst officials that such an arrangement would enable aircraft to be built with a lighter and simpler structure, and thus be capable of achieving greater performance in comparison to their conventional peers, particularly amongst those being operated from aircraft carriers. Specifically, it was thought that the weight reduction achieved by eliminating the reinforced undercarriage used on naval aircraft would lead to substantially great rates of climb and acceleration. Seeking to keep the airframe compact and lightweight, it was desirable to adopt the most powerful powerplants available while restricting its diameter and thus its overall size; it was promptly determined that placing a pair of engines in a side-by-side configuration resulted in a relatively flat fuselage cross-section that generated favourable characteristics for undercarriage-less landings.

Supermarine's design to meet this requirement, internally designated Type 505, featured an unusual V-tail (or "butterfly tail") arrangement that kept the tail surfaces away from the jet exhausts. Pitch control was performed via movements of the whole tail, the elevators being capable of working in tandem to provide additional pitch control, while also replacing the rudder of a conventional tail when being worked differentially. Wide-chord ailerons were installed for lateral control while leading and trailing edge flaps were also fitted, including dive flaps to aid in recovery during high speed flight by restoring lift. A cockpit akin to the earlier Supermarine Attacker was positioned within the aircraft's nose, it was pressurised to better facilitate flying at altitude. The powerplant selected was the Rolls-Royce Avon turbojet engine, a pair of which being installed side by side within the fuselage; it was accessed via removable panels on the upper fuselage. A relatively thin wing could also be adopted, having been freed from the necessity of bearing elements of the undercarriage; while considerations towards a swept wing configuration were made, the option was discounted due to it presenting too many unknown factors at the time. Instead, a straight wing with a constant airfoil section was adopted; its leading edge section was as large as was feasible to minimise premature breakaway of airflow, a phenomenon that could lead to stalls.

=== Redesign ===
During 1948, the Admiralty had second thoughts about the undercarriage-less fighter, leading to Supermarine reworking their design by including a nosewheel undercarriage, the resulting redesign being designated the Type 508. This led to the adoption of a retractable nosewheel undercarriage; redesign work was aided by considerations that had already made for the installation of a conventional undercarriage upon the Type 505 during its initial test flights. Furthermore, the viable landing speed was also reduced at this time, necessitating various alterations, such as the wing thickness being increased from seven to nine percent for a higher lift coefficient, while the wing's area was also expanded.

The Type 508 was the first Scimitar ancestor; it shared the broad layout of the unflown Type 505, both possessing a straight-wing paired with a V-tail and twin jet engines. The redesign was done in a manner that, if desired, an undercarriage-less configuration was still viable; furthermore, it was designed in such a manner that it could be readily adapted to Royal Air Force requirements as well. The primary structural change between the two designs affected the wing spars, which were redirected underneath the engines to accommodate the undercarriage. During November 1947, Supermarine received an initial order for three Type 508s to fulfil Specification N.9/47.

=== Into flight ===
On 31 August 1951, the first Type 508 performed its maiden flight from RAF Boscombe Down; by May 1952, the aircraft had commenced carrier-based trials aboard HMS Eagle. The second aircraft featured significant differences, carrying a cannon armament and was different enough in detail to be renamed the Type 529. It flew for the first time on 29 August 1952. One unusual modification was the larger tailcone, which had been implemented so that a proposed tail-warning radar could be accommodated. The maximum speed of the straight-winged Type 508 and 529 was relatively modest, with the Type 529 reaching 607 mph (977 km/h) and it had already been decided when the Type 508 first flew, to redesign the third prototype with swept wings to improve performance. The resulting Type 525 also featured conventional swept tail surfaces as well as blown flaps to reduce the aircraft's landing speed and first flew on 27 April 1954.

While the aircraft was subsequently lost as a result of a crash, numerous favourable performance improvements had been observed, including a reduction in its stalling speed, a reduced angle of attack, increased stability and control at low speeds, and more stable airflow over the wing's trailing edge. Thus, the basic design was considered to have been sufficiently proved to the extent that officials decided to proceed with an outwardly fairly similar looking aircraft, the Type 544, to fulfil Specification N.113. A total of 100 aircraft were ordered, although the Royal Navy had changed the specification to a low level strike aircraft with nuclear capability, despite having originally been designed as a fighter.

The first of the Type 544s, serving as prototypes for the later production series, flew on 19 January 1956. The aircraft evolved more with the third Type 544, incorporating different aerodynamic changes and a stronger airframe for the new low level role - to quote Flight; "To permit uninhibited manoeuvring in thick turbulent air at low levels while carrying heavy loads of strike weapons, the structure is extremely sturdy". Various aerodynamic "fixes" were implemented in an effort to counter undesirable pitch-up effects present during high speed flight and at high altitudes; these included flared-out wing tips and wing fences, while the tailplane was also changed from dihedral to anhedral. These combined modifications led to the final Type 544 being considered the "production standard". The first production Scimitar flew on 11 January 1957.

The Scimitar pioneered fuel flow proportioning and integral main-plane tanks, along with "blown" flying surfaces to reduce landing speeds. It also featured the first use of duplicated fully-powered flight controls by a British naval aircraft.

== Operational history ==
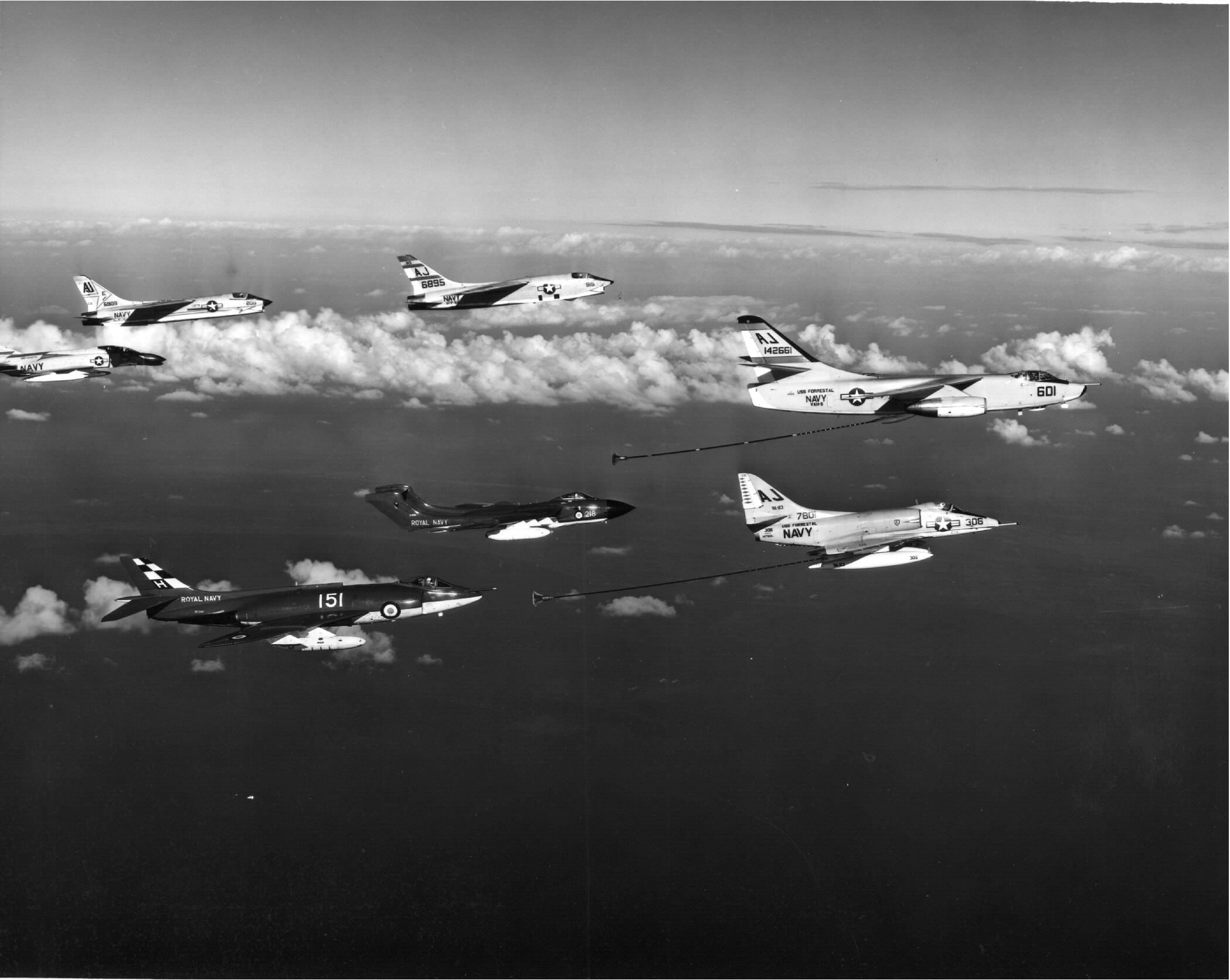
An 803 NAS Scimitar from HMS Hermes together with a Sea Vixen, and an A-4, two F-8s, an A-3 and an F-4 of the US Navy over the Mediterranean Sea

At the point of its introduction, the Scimitar was the largest, heaviest and most powerful aircraft to have entered service with the Fleet Air Arm. In June 1958, operational training on the type commenced with 803 Naval Air Squadron at RNAS Lossiemouth, prior to their embarkment upon the aircraft carrier HMS Victorious during September of that year. Multiple squadrons formed around the Scimitar shortly thereafter, leading to its use upon the carriers HMS Ark Royal, HMS Centaur, HMS Eagle, and HMS Victorious.

Although the Scimitar could operate as a fighter, the interceptor role was covered by the de Havilland Sea Venom and then the de Havilland Sea Vixen. The Scimitar itself was replaced by the Blackburn Buccaneer. It was kept initially as a tanker to allow the underpowered Buccaneer S.1 to be launched from aircraft carriers with a useful weapons load. To save weight, the Buccaneer would take off with a reduced fuel load then refuel from a Scimitar immediately after. Late in the Scimitar's operational career, 16 examples were flown between 1965 and 1970 by the Fleet Requirements Unit (FRU) based at Bournemouth Airport (Hurn). The FRU was managed by Airwork Services and provided realistic flight operations for land and sea-based naval training units.

=== Notable accidents ===
Early on in the Scimitar's flying career, the majority of the Royal Navy's aircraft carriers were relatively small while the Scimitar was comparatively large and powerful. This combination likely contributed to landing accidents with the type. It suffered from a high loss rate—39 were lost in a number of accidents, amounting to 51% of its production run.

On 25 September 1958, when landing on the newly-recommissioned HMS Victorious and in full view of the press, one of the arrestor wires broke, causing the Scimitar (serial XD240) of Commander John Russell (commanding officer of 803 Naval Air Squadron) to fall into the sea. With no means of ejecting through the canopy and despite the best efforts of the crew of the Westland Whirlwind planeguard helicopter to rescue him, Russell drowned as his Scimitar sank. The incident was later broadcast by British Pathé News. After the aircraft was recovered, it was found that Russell had managed to open the canopy, but had been prevented from successfully escaping due to being tethered by ejector seat leg straps and the dinghy lanyard.

On 19 November 1958, after losing altitude over the Black Isle in the Scottish Highlands, Sublieutenant C.R. Cresswell ejected from his Scimitar (serial XD247). His parachute only partially opened and he plummeted into the ground. The Scimitar crashed approximately 2 miles (3.2 km) from his landing location. He was taken to the nearby Raigmore Hospital, where he died of his injuries the following day.

== Variants ==
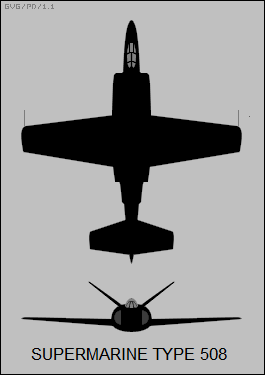
Supermarine 508 research aircraft

=== Predecessors ===
Type 508
Straight-wing research aircraft.
Type 529
Straight-wing research aircraft.
Type 525
Swept-wing research aircraft.

=== Prototypes ===
Type 544
Prototype for the Scimitar F.1, 3 built by Vickers-Armstrong Experimental Department at Hursley Park

=== Production model ===
Scimitar F.1
Single-seat multi-role fighter aircraft, 76 built by Vickers-Armstrong at South Marston. Original order was for 100 aircraft in 1952 later reduced to 76.

== Operators ==
United Kingdom

- Royal Navy Fleet Air Arm
  - 700 Naval Air Squadron (1958-59)
    - 700X Scimitar F.1 IFTU (1957-58)
  - 736 Naval Air Squadron (1959-65)
  - 764 Naval Air Squadron (1959)
    - 764B Naval Air Squadron (1965)
  - 800 Naval Air Squadron (1959-64)
    - 800B Naval Air Squadron (1964-66)
  - 803 Naval Air Squadron (1958-66)
  - 804 Naval Air Squadron (1960-61)
  - 807 Naval Air Squadron (1958-62)
  - Airwork Fleet Requirements Unit (1965-70)

== Surviving aircraft ==
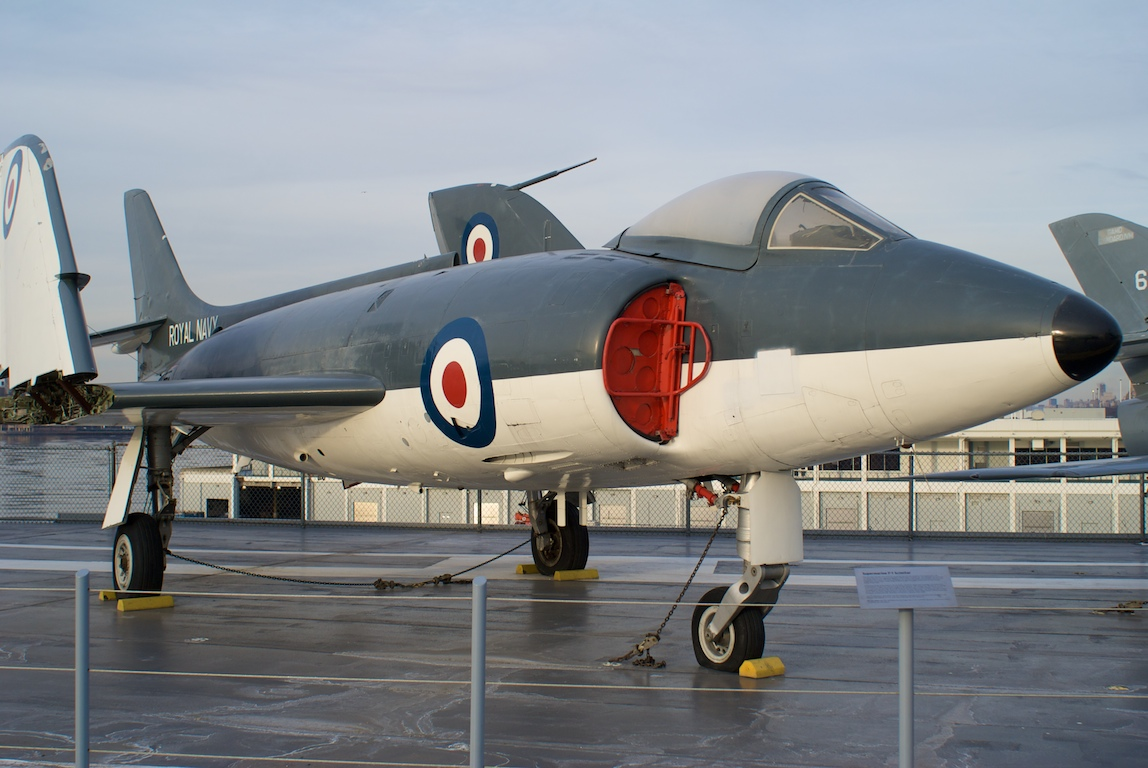
XD220 at the Intrepid Sea, Air & Space Museum in 2009

=== United Kingdom ===
- Scimitar F.1 XD317 at the Fleet Air Arm Museum in Yeovilton, Somerset.

=== United States ===
- Scimitar F.1 XD220 at the Empire State Aerosciences Museum in Glenville, New York. It was formerly at the Intrepid Sea, Air & Space Museum in New York, New York (on loan from the Fleet Air Arm Museum).

== Specifications ==
Data from Supermarine Aircraft since 1914

General characteristics

- Crew: 1
- Length: 55 ft 3 in (16.84 m)
- Wingspan: 37 ft 2 in (11.33 m)
- Height: 17 ft 4 in (5.28 m)
- Wing area: 485 sq ft (45.1 m^{2})
- Empty weight: 23,962 lb (10,869 kg)
- Gross weight: 34,200 lb (15,513 kg)
- Powerplant: 2 × Rolls-Royce Avon 202 turbojet engines, 11,250 lbf (50.0 kN) thrust each

Performance

- Maximum speed: 640 kn (740 mph, 1,190 km/h) at sea level
- Range: 1,237 nmi (1,424 mi, 2,291 km)
- Service ceiling: 46,000 ft (14,000 m)
- Rate of climb: 6,751 ft/min (34.30 m/s)
- Time to altitude: 45,000 ft (14,000 m) in 6 minutes 39 seconds
- Wing loading: 70.515 lb/sq ft (344.28 kg/m^{2}) (gross weight)

Armament

- Guns: Four × 30 mm ADEN cannon with 160 rounds per gun
- Hardpoints: 4 , with provisions to carry combinations of:
  - Rockets: Up to 16 two or three inch (51 or 76 mm) unguided rockets (4 per pylon)
  - Missiles: Four × AGM-12 Bullpup or AIM-9 Sidewinder missiles
  - Bombs: Four × 1,000 lb (454 kg) bombs or one Red Beard freefall nuclear bomb

== See also ==
Aircraft of comparable role, configuration, and era

- Dassault Étendard IV
- McDonnell F3H Demon

== Resources ==
- Andrews, C.F. and E.B. Morgan. Supermarine Aircraft Since 1914. London: Putnam, 1981. ISBN 978-0-370-10018-0.
- Andrews, C.F. and E.B. Morgan. Supermarine Aircraft since 1914. London: Putnam, 1987. ISBN 978-0-85177-800-6.
- Birtles, Philip. Supermarine Attacker, Swift and Scimitar (Postwar Military Aircraft 7). London: Ian Allan, 1992. ISBN 978-0-7110-2034-4.
- Buttler, Tony. "Database: Supermarine Scimitar". Aeroplane. Volume 36, No. 12, Issue No. 428, December 2008.
- Buttler, Tony. "Type Analysis: Supermarine Scimitar". International Air Power Review. Norwalk, Connecticut, USA:AIRtime Publishing. Volume Two, Autumn/Fall 2001, pp. 158–173. ISBN 978-1-880588-34-5, ISSN 1473-9917.
- Buttler, Tony. X-Planes of Europe II: Military Prototype Aircraft from the Golden Age 1946–1974. Manchester, UK: Hikoki Publications, 2015. ISBN 978-1-90210-948-0
- Mason, Francis K. The British Fighter since 1912. Annapolis, Maryland: Naval Institute Press, 1992. ISBN 978-1-55750-082-3.
- Stoddart, Paul J. (January 2022). "Sharpening the Scimitar: Could Supermarine's Naval Jet Fighter Ever Have Been World Class?". The Aviation Historian (38): 78–32. ISSN 2051-1930.
- Thetford, Owen. British Naval Aircraft since 1912. London: Putnam, 1978. ISBN 978-0-370-30021-4.
- Sturtivant, Ray; Ballance, Theo (1994). The Squadrons of The Fleet Air Arm. Tonbridge, Kent: Air-Britain (Historians). ISBN 978-0-85130-223-2.
