= Supermarine B.12/36 =

1930s British bomber aircraft design project

B.12/36
- An artist's impression of the bomber

General information
- Type: Heavy bomber prototype
- Manufacturer: Supermarine
- Designer: R J Mitchell
- Status: Destroyed in a bombing raid (September 1940)
- Number built: 2 (partly constructed)

History
- First flight: Not flown

The Supermarine B.12/36 was a British prototype four-engine heavy bomber design that was destroyed by enemy action before completion during the Second World War.

== Design and development ==
=== Specification ===
In July 1936 the British Air Ministry issued specification no. B12/36 'Heavy Bomber' to the British aircraft industry, The specification was for a high speed (Note: Up to 275 miles per hour (443 km/h), with a cruising speed of 230 miles per hour (370 km/h).) four-engined heavy bomber for the Royal Air Force. The aircraft was required to be able to fly 3,000 miles (4,800 km) and be able to carry either a bomb load of 14,000 pounds (6,400 kg) or 24 soldiers. Other requirements included being able to be transported on the British railway system in parts, as well as being able to take off using a catapult, and clear a height of 50 feet (15 m) after taking off from a 500 feet (150 m) runway. The specification limited the wingspan to 100 feet (30 m) and insisted the design would allow for the need to remain afloat at sea for several hours if necessary.

Supermarine was one of the British aircraft manufacturers that were invited to tender a design., the other companies invited to tender being Armstrong-Whitworth, Handley Page, Fairey, Boulton Paul, Vickers, and Shorts. Supermarine may possibly have been invited due to the company's experience in designing water-resistant hulls and the ability to be launched by means of a catapult, as with the Walrus.

=== Design ===
Supermarine's design, the Type 316, was a single-spar, mid-wing aircraft; the leading edge was swept back but the trailing edge was straight. Bombs were carried in both the wings and the fuselage, and defensive armament was in three turrets. Of the different powerplants suggested for the Type 316, there were three of more than 1,000 horsepower (750 kW); the Rolls-Royce Merlin, the Bristol Hercules radial engine and the Napier Dagger. The aircraft's estimated maximum speed was between 330 and 370 mph (530 and 600 km/h), and the estimated cruising speed was 260 mph (420 km/h). The estimated operating ceiling was around 30,000 ft (9,144 m) and range was 3,000 mi (4,800 km).

The different proposals were considered by the Air Ministry in October 1936. Supermarine's design was initially low down in the list, behind Vickers, Boulton Paul, and Armstrong Whitworth. Following an interview with Supermarine's chief designer, R.J. Mitchell the following month, the Air Ministry moved Supermarine up the ranking, and by January 1937 it had been selected as the preferred choice. Both the Air Ministry and Supermarine initiated changes to the design, giving it a larger wing area and a twin tail unit. This revised design was the Type 317. Two prototypes with Hercules engines were ordered on 22 March 1937. The Short S.29 was considered as a backup but re-design work was requested and in June the Air Ministry decided to order prototypes of that also. The death of Mitchell had made the Supermarine design riskier. Supermarine continued with design work for a Merlin engined version—the Type 318. In July 1937 Supermarine were told to stop work on the 318 to concentrate on the 317.

== Cancellation ==
While still under construction, the two prototypes were damaged beyond repair when the Supermarine Works at Woolston was bombed by the Luftwaffe during a daylight raid on 26 September 1940. The construction plans were also lost. The Air Ministry formally cancelled the order in November 1940.

The Short S.29 was accepted into service as the Short Stirling and was the principal British four-engine heavy bomber until eclipsed by the Handley Page Halifax and Avro Lancaster, both coming out of specification B13/36 for a twin-engined bomber.

== Specifications (Type 317 estimated performance) ==
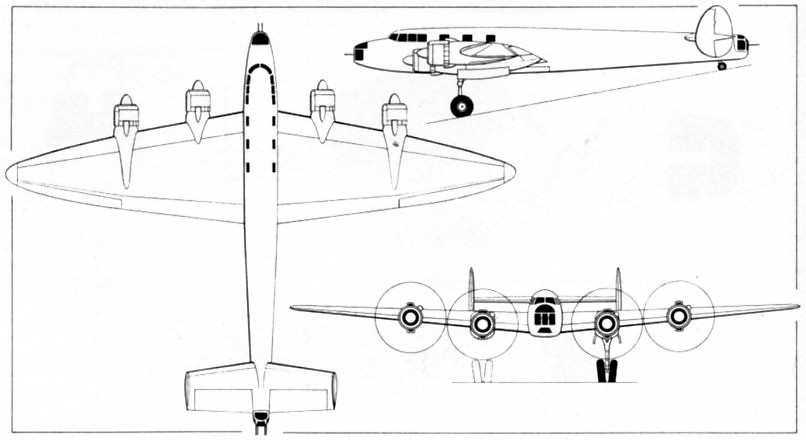
General arrangement drawings

Data from Buttler

General characteristics

- Length: 73 ft 6 in (22.40 m)
- Wingspan: 97 ft 0 in (29.57 m)
- Wing area: 1,358 sq ft (126.2 m^{2})
- Gross weight: 55,000 lb (24,948 kg) approx
- Powerplant: 4 × Bristol Hercules HE.1.SM radial engines, 1,315 hp (981 kW) each

Performance

- Maximum speed: 360 mph (580 km/h, 310 kn) at 14,000 ft (4,420 m)

Armament

- Guns: 8 x 0.303 in (7.7 mm) machine guns
- Bombs: 29 x 250 lb or 500 lb bombs

== Sources ==
- Andrews, C.F.; Morgan, E.B. (1987). Supermarine Aircraft Since 1914, Second edition (Hardback). London: Putnam. ISBN 978-0-85177-800-6.
- Buttler, Tony (2004a). British Secret Projects: Jet Fighters Since 1950 (Hardback). Manchester: Crecy Publishing. ISBN 978-1-910-80905-1.
- Buttler, Tony (2004b). British Secret Projects: Fighters and Bombers 1935-1950 (Hardback). Manchester: Crecy Publishing. ISBN 978-1-85780-179-8.
- Mackay, Ron (1989). Short Stirling in Action. Carrollton, Texas: Signal Publications. ISBN 978-0-89747-228-9.
- Norris, Geoffrey (1966). The Short Stirling. Aircraft in Profile Number 142. Windsor, UK: Profile Publications Ltd. OCLC 45000607.
- Pegram, Ralph (2016). Beyond the Spitfire: The Unseen Designs of R.J. Mitchell. Cheltenham, UK: The History Press. pp. 200–205. ISBN 978-0-7509-6515-6.
- Shelton, John K. (2015). From Nighthawk to Spitfire: The Aircraft of R.J. Mitchell. Stroud, UK: History Press. pp. 162–166. ISBN 978-07509-6-550-7.
- Sinnott, Colin (2001). The RAF and Aircraft Design, 1923-1939: Air Staff Operational Requirements. London; Portland, Oregon: Frank Cass. ISBN 978-0-7146-5158-3.
