= Air Department =

Former UK aircraft agency

Department overview
- Formed: 1910
- Dissolved: 1920
- Superseding Department: Air Section
- Jurisdiction: Government of the United Kingdom
- Headquarters: Admiralty Building; Whitehall; London
- Parent department: Admiralty

The Air Department of the British Admiralty (later succeeded by the Air Section and the Air Division) was established prior to World War I by Winston Churchill to administer the Royal Naval Air Service.

== History ==
In 1908, the British government had recognised that the use of aircraft for military and naval purposes should be explored. To this end, the Prime Minister, H. H. Asquith, approved the formation of an "Advisory Committee for Aeronautics" and an "Aerial Sub-Committee of the Committee of Imperial Defence". Both committees were composed of politicians, army officers and Royal Navy officers.

The Air Department was established within the Admiralty in 1910 and had the initial responsibility of building an airship. By 1911 it expanded its activities to heavier-than-air machines. In early 1912 it became jointly responsible with the Directorate of Military Aeronautics for the Royal Flying Corps, which had separate military and naval wings.

After prolonged discussion on the Committee of Imperial Defence, the Royal Flying Corps was constituted by Royal Warrant on 13 April 1912. It absorbed the nascent naval air detachment and also the Air Battalion of the Royal Engineers. It consisted of two wings: a Military Wing and a Naval Wing.

In the summer of 1912, in recognition of the air branch's expansion, Captain Murray Sueter was appointed Director of the newly formed Air Department at the Admiralty. Sueter's remit as outlined in September 1912 stated that he was responsible to the Admiralty for "all matters connected with the Naval Air Service."

The department's function was to foster naval aviation developments and later to oversee the Royal Naval Air Service (RNAS). Its first director was Captain Murray Sueter. In 1915, with the growth of the Naval Air Service, the position of Director of the Air Department was abolished and replaced by that of Director of the Air Service. This new post was a flag officer appointment and the first Director was Rear-Admiral Charles Vaughan-Lee.

In July 1914 the naval wing became a separate service known as the Royal Naval Air Service, under the sole control of the Air Department. When World War I started the RNAS became responsible for co-operation with the Navy, for the bombing of all naval targets at sea and in ports.

Originally, British naval aviation came under the authority of the Commander-in-Chief, The Nore. In February 1915, the RNAS was placed under the command of the Director of the Air Department (Captain Murray Sueter), although disciplinary powers over RNAS personnel were not granted to the Director. In July 1915 a further reorganization occurred when the post of Director of the Air Department was abolished and replaced with that of the Director of the Air Service (Rear-Admiral Charles Vaughan-Lee).

In January 1918 control of the (RNAS), excluding airships and balloons, were the responsibility of the Director of Naval Construction as early as 1916 and which the Admiralty retained until 1919, passed to the Air Ministry in April 1918 following re-structuring it was merged with the RFC as the Royal Air Force. The Admiralty maintained control of its aircraft carriers naval operations at sea, and naval officers however its personnel transferred to the (RAF) for training and service.

In 1920 the air department was renamed the Air Section of the Admiralty Naval Staff which in turn was renamed the Air Division in 1924.

== Directors ==
The Director of the Air Department (D.A.D.) was a position in the Admiralty from 1912 to 1915 succeeded by the Director of the Air Service until 1917, The Director was responsible to the Board of Admiralty on aviation issues, and administered the Admiralty Air Department.

- Commodore Murray F. Sueter, 1912–1915.
- Rear-Admiral Charles Vaughan-Lee, 1915–1917.

== Aircraft design and production ==
The Air Department produced a few of its own designs for aircraft between 1915 and but these were built by established external aircraft manufacturers

- AD Flying Boat – built by Supermarine
- AD Navyplane – built by Supermarine
- AD Scout – built by Blackburn and by Hewlett and Blondeau
- AD Seaplane Type 1000 – built by J. Samuel White

== Sources ==
- Roskill, Stephen Wentworth (1969), Documents Relating to the Naval Air Service: 1908–1918, vol. I, London: Navy Records Society
