= AD Navyplane =

1910s British float plane project

- the aircraft in February 1916

General information
- Type: Reconnaissance aircraft
- Manufacturer: Air Department/Supermarine
- Designer: Harold Bolas
- Status: Cancelled
- Primary user: Royal Naval Air Service
- Number built: 1

History
- Manufactured: January 1916
- First flight: August 1916
- Retired: 27 August 1917

The AD Navyplane ( also AD.1 Navyplane) was designed by the British Admiralty's Air Department as a reconnaissance aircraft for use during World War I. Performance of the prototype was so disappointing that plans to produce it were cancelled almost immediately.

The Navyplane was designed by the Admiralty's Harold Bolas with the assistance of R.J. Mitchell of Supermarine. It was a pusher floatplane biplane with the pilot and observer being seated ahead of the wings in a streamlined lightweight nacelle mounted in the gap between the upper and lower sets of wings. A Smith Static radial engine and a pusher propeller were installed behind them.

Two examples were ordered in 1916 for the Royal Naval Air Service (RNAS). Serial numbers were allocated for seven Navyplanes (9095-'96, N.1070-'74) but just one prototype (9095) was completed. Tests of this Supermarine-built prototype commenced in August 1916 (flown by Lieutenant-Commander John Seddon) but proved seriously underpowered and unsatisfactory. The engine was replaced with an AR.1 rotary engine (which was later redesignated the BR.1 for Bentley Rotary 1) and retested in May 1917. However, even without a military load and observer, the Navyplane's performance still proved to be poor, and the design was abandoned on 27 August 1917, with no second prototype being produced.

Supermarine attempted to design an improved version to replace the Short 184, the design, the Supermarine Patrol Seaplane, being powered by a 200 hp (149 kW) Sunbeam engine. While contracts for six aircraft were placed, work was abandoned before a prototype was built, the Short 184 proving adequate in the patrol role.

== Specifications (AD Navyplane) ==
Data from British Aeroplanes 1914-18

General characteristics

- Crew: 2

Performance

- Endurance: 6 hr
- Time to altitude: 30 min to 2,000 ft (610 m)

Armament

- Guns: 1× .303 in (0.770 mm) Lewis machine gun on flexible mount for observer
- Bombs: Provision for bombs
