= Supermarine =

1913–1960 aircraft manufacturer

Supermarine Aviation Works
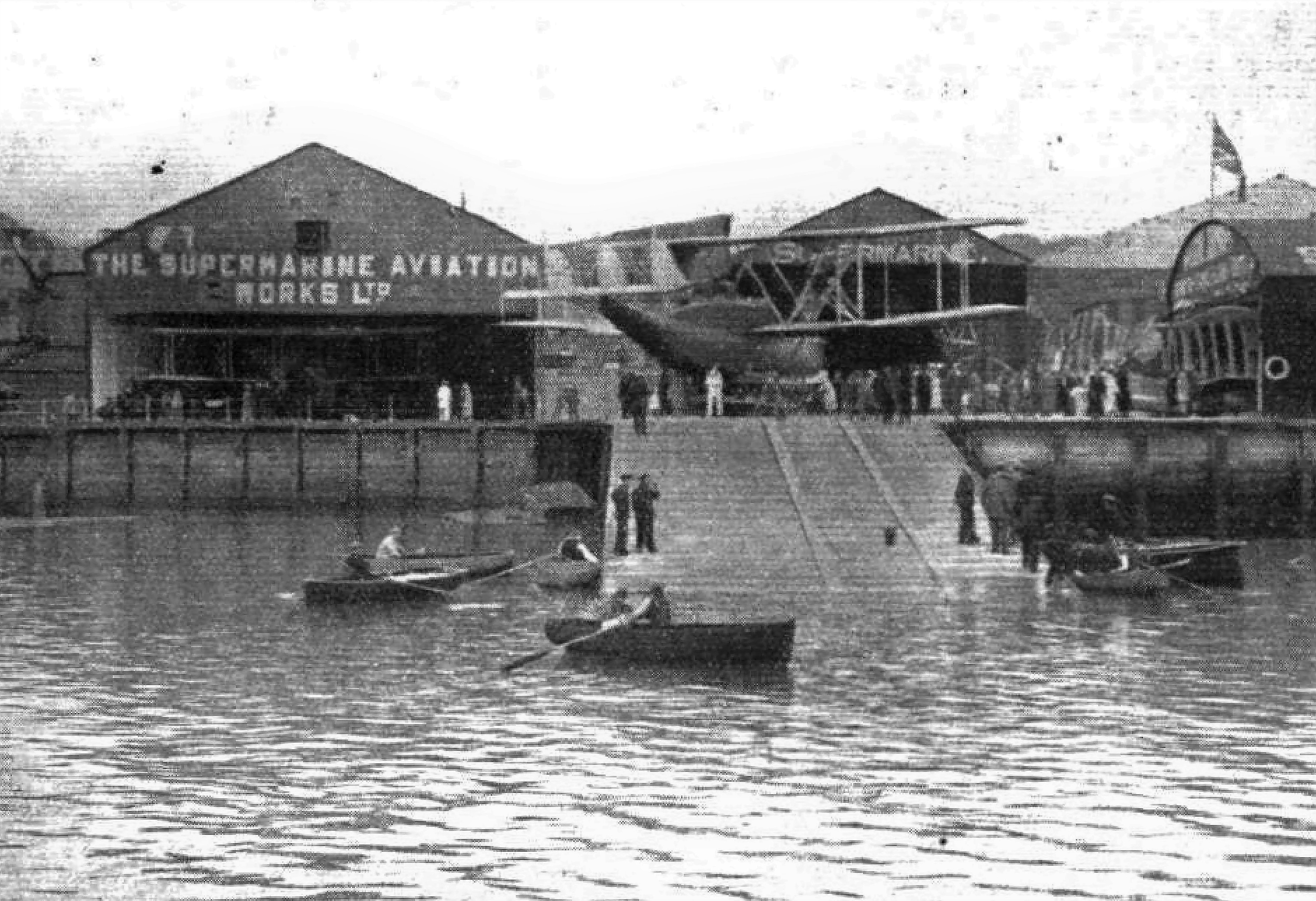
- Supermarine Aviation Ltd, Woolston, in 1924
- Industry: Aviation
- Founded: 1913 (as Pemberton-Billing Ltd.)
- Defunct: 1960 (incorporation into BAC)
- Fate: Merged and name dropped
- Successor: Vickers-Armstrongs (Aircraft)
- Headquarters: Woolston
- Key people: Noel Pemberton Billing; R. J. Mitchell; Hubert Scott-Paine; Joe Smith
- Parent: Vickers-Armstrongs (1928 onwards)

Supermarine (founded in 1913 as Pemberton-Billing Ltd) was a British aircraft manufacturer. It is most famous for producing the Spitfire fighter plane during World War II. The company built a range of seaplanes and flying boats, winning the Schneider Trophy for seaplanes with three consecutive victories (in 1927, 1929 and 1931). After the war, the company produced a series of jet fighters.

The company was located on the River Itchen close to Woolston, Southampton, on ground purchased by the British aviator and inventor Noel Pemberton Billing. He designed two prototype quadruplanes designed to shoot down Zeppelins—the Supermarine P.B.29 and the Supermarine Nighthawk. Pemberton Billing sold the company to his longtime associate Hubert Scott-Paine in 1916, when it was renamed Supermarine Aviation Works Ltd..

In 1928, Vickers-Armstrongs took over Supermarine as Supermarine Aviation Works (Vickers) Ltd. and in 1938 all Vickers-Armstrongs aviation interests were reorganised to become Vickers-Armstrongs (Aircraft) Ltd, although Supermarine continued to design, build and trade under its own name. The first Supermarine landplane design to go into production was the Spitfire, which caught the popular imagination and became the aircraft associated with the Battle of Britain. The aircraft went on to play a major part during the Second World War, in a number of variants and marks. Other company planes from the period include the Seafire (a naval version of the Spitfire). Supermarine developed the Spiteful and Seafang, the successors of the Spitfire and the Seafire respectively, and the Walrus flying boat. The Supermarine main works was heavily bombed in 1940. This caused work on their first heavy bomber design, the Supermarine B.12/36, to be abandoned.

Supermarine built the Royal Navy's first jet fighter, the Attacker, developed from the final Spitfire type. It served front line squadrons aboard aircraft carriers and RNVR squadrons at shore bases. This was followed by the more advanced Swift, which served in the fighter and photo-reconnaissance roles. The last of the Supermarine aircraft was the Scimitar. After Vickers-Armstrongs (Aircraft) became a part of the British Aircraft Corporation, its individual manufacturing heritage names, including that of Supermarine, were dropped. All these heritage companies are now part of BAE Systems.

== Pemberton-Billing Ltd ==
=== Founding ===
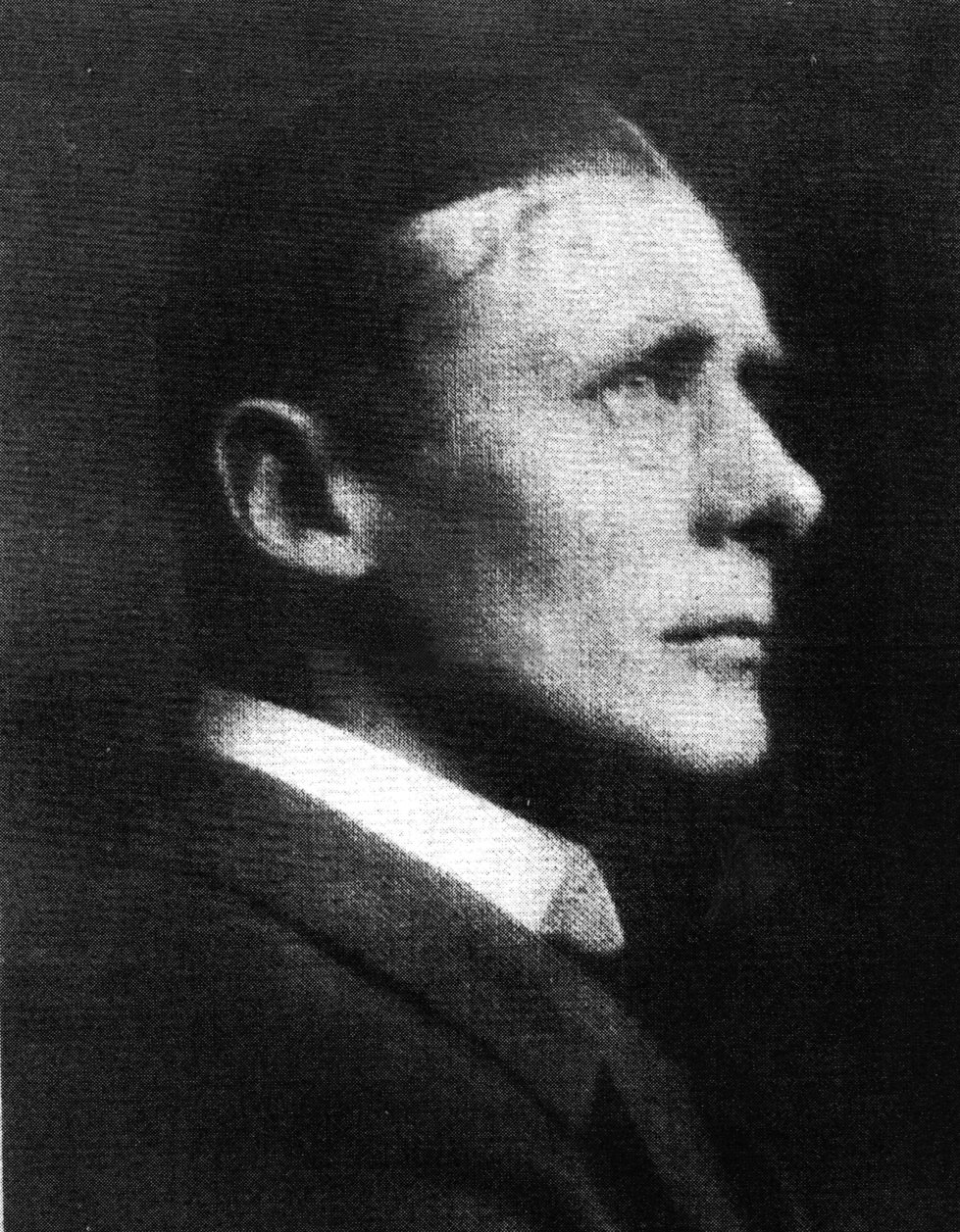
Studio portrait of Billing released for publication to the press in 1916

In 1909 Noel Pemberton-Billing purchased a number of engineering workshops on 3,000 acres (1,200 ha) of land at South in Sussex which he intended to develop as an airfield. At the same time, he built a number of unsuccessful aircraft of his own design. To promote the venture, he founded his own magazine Aerocraft. Despite attracting some aircraft constructors, the airfield venture failed within a year and about the same time he sold Aerocraft. In 1911, Pemberton-Billing purchased facilities to provide a base for a motor launch and yacht trading business at White's Yard off Elm Road (later renamed Hazel Road) on the River Itchen, upstream of Woolston. To manage the business, Pemberton-Billing hired his friend Scott-Paine, whom he had first met while involved in property speculation in Shoreham, Kent. Pemberton-Billing, his wife and Scott-Paine lived on Pemberton-Billing's yacht Utopia.

Under Scott-Paine's management the business was soon profitable, which allowed Billing (with the assistance of Scott-Paine) to design a series of flying boats with detachable propeller and wings so that with them removed it could be used as a motor launch. Pemberton-Billing submitted a patent application for his design in October 1913. After obtaining his aviator's certificate on 17 September 1913 following a £500 bet with Frederick Handley-Page that he could obtain it within 24 hour of commencing flight training, he decided to build his own aircraft.

In partnership with Alfred Delves de Broughton, Billing established Pemberton-Billing Ltd on 27 June 1914 with capital of £20,000. Billing had 6,800 shares, Broughton 3,700 and works engineer Lorenz Hans Herkomer (1889–1922), 500. Herkomer's background was in electrical engineering and automobiles. Romanian Carol Vasilesco was employed to prepare drawings and undertake the detailed design of airframes. On land at Oakbank Wharf on the river Itchen in Woolston that Billing had previously purchased, the company established a factory with Hubert Scott-Paine as work manager. Its registered telegraphic address, used for sending telegrams and cables to the company, was; Supermarine, Southampton.

=== Early aircraft ===
The first aircraft built by the new company was the Pemberton-Billing P.B.1 a single-seat open cockpit biplane flying boat. Following modifications, the P.B.1 entered testing, but failed to achieve flight. Billing, who had designed the aircraft, claimed he "wanted a boat which would fly rather than an aircraft that would float". Though no proof can be found, Billing claimed that the aircraft made a short hop but other sources state that the PB.1 never flew. The sole P.B.1 was subsequently dismantled and no other examples were constructed.

Another early design was the P.B.7, a flying lifeboat with detachable wings. The next significant design was the P.B.9 that used a set of wings which had been obtained from Radley-England. One example was built and while it flew it was felt that production was not worth pursuing. With no orders coming in, Billing had to sell one of his yachts and lease out part of the facilities to Tom Sopwith who used it for assembly and then testing of his Bat Boat.

=== World War I ===
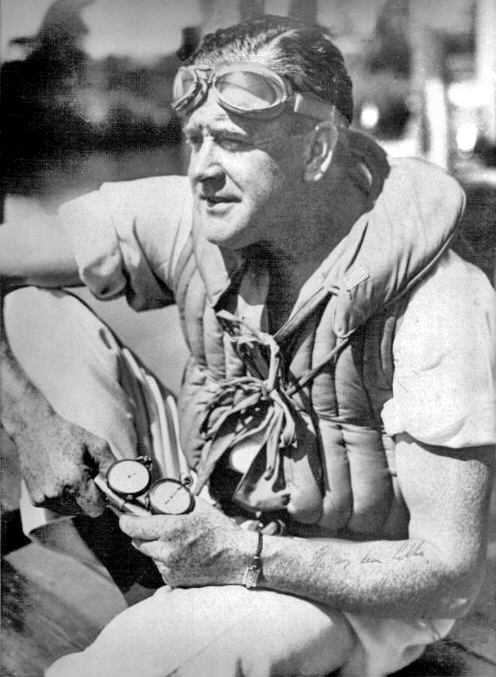
Hubert Scott-Paine

At the outbreak the First World War Billing enlisted in the Royal Navy Volunteer reserve, and thus he was no longer involved in day-to-day activities. With the business by now in serious financial trouble due to a lack of orders, 80 per cent of the staff were fired, leaving only 14 employees. On 14 November 1914 Broughton used his resources to pay off the company's debits which allowed the company to continue in business. Some work was obtained repairing aircraft subcontracting from Sopwith. Broughton then enlisted which left Scott-Paine in charge. At some point in 1914 Carol Vasilesco died suddenly of a heart attack, which left the company without a designer.

In early 1915 the company obtained work building 12 Short S.38 seaplanes under licence.

Work continued on the company's own designs with the next to see the light of day being the P.B.23. The prototype was delivered in September 1915 with tests conducted at Heldon indicating that the design had some promise. As a result, a revised version designated the P.B.25 was produced, for which an order for 20 was received from the Royal Naval Air Service. In late 1915 having completed serving with the RNVR and RNAS Billing returned to the company. As a result of his experience while involved in the organising of the air raid in November 1914 on the Zeppelin sheds at Friedrichshafen on Lake Constance Billing believed that England was defenceless against attacks by Zeppelins.

As a result, his return led to the company concentrating on designing the quadruplane P.B.29, which was designed to shoot down Zeppelins. In May 1916 the company was awarded by the Air Department of the Admiralty a contract to build the flying surfaces for the AD flying boat and to undertake the detailed design and construction of the AD Navyplane. The AD Flying Boat was initially found to have poor performance in the water, which were eventually resolved. This led to 34 being built, though none saw service.

== Supermarine Aviation Works ==
In March 1916 Billing was elected as a Member of Parliament. Once in parliament he was very vocal in his support of air power, constantly accusing the government of neglecting the issue. As he intended to run a campaign against the Royal Aircraft Factory and its products, it became apparent that if the company was to maintain a good relationship with the Air Department and gain any further orders it was necessary for the company to distance itself from Billing. As a result, Billing sold his shares in the company for about £12,500 to Scott-Paine and the other directors who renamed the company Supermarine Aviation Works Ltd and officially registered it under that name on 27 June 1916. As well as Scott-Paine, the other directors were Alfred Delves de Broughton and solicitor Charles Cecil Dominy.

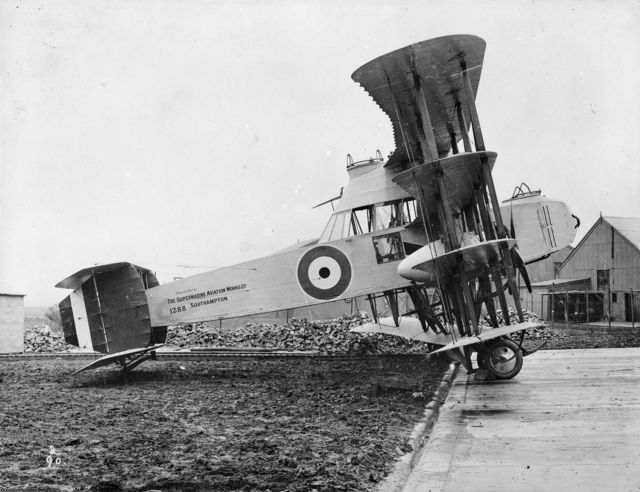
Supermarine P.B.31E Nighthawk

The first product of the new company was the P.B.31E Nighthawk which was a carryover from Billing's time for a quadruplane heavily armed and searchlight-equipped home defence fighter. Fitted with a recoilless Davis gun, it had a separate powerplant to power the searchlight. Only the prototype was built, which was found to have insufficient performance to be of any use against Zeppelins. After completion of the Nighthawk Scott-Paine dropped Billing's fixation with anti-Zeppelin defence fighters, and in the hope of gaining orders for flying boats forged a strong relationship with the RNAS through their local liaison officer James Bird.

In early 1916 William Abraham Hargreaves was hired as chief designer.

By 1917 realizing that he needed to strengthen the company's technical capability Scott-Paine advertised for a personal assistant. The successful applicant was R. J. Mitchell, who so impressed Scott-Paine he was hired on the spot and given a range of roles within the company to expose him to every aspect of the business including within a year acted for a period as assistant works manager.

In 1917 the company was contracted to build Short Type 184 torpedo bombers and Norman Thompson N.T.2B trainers.

In response to the issue of Navy Air Board Specification N.1(b) in early 1917, the company designed what later was called the Supermarine Baby. Three were subsequently built.

=== Post World War I ===
The signing of the armistice agreement, with little prospect of any military contracts for some time, led to the company diversifying by employing its woodworkers in constructing everything from toilet seats to wooden framed bodies for Ford Model T cars.

At the end of the war Supermarine was the only British aircraft constructor dedicated to building flying boats and Scott-Paine still wished the company to continue in this specialist field. To this end Supermarine joined the Society of British Aircraft Constructors in late 1919 and purchased from the government about 16 surplus AD Flying boats and the two completed Supermarine Babys. Supermarine modified 10 of the AD Flying boats to produce the commercial "Type C" Channel flying boats. The reconfigured aircraft provided accommodation for a pilot and three passengers in three open cockpits. Once the ban on civilian flying was lifted in May 1919 the ten aircraft were registered in June 1919, with three being granted civil certificates of airworthiness at the end of July of that same year. Services commenced in August from Southampton with typically three in service.

To pilot the commercial services Scott-Paine employed ex-RNAS pilots Henri Biard, Francis Bailey, Philip Brend. John Hoare, Basil Hobbs and Herbert Horsey.

Following the completion of his duties for the Royal Naval Air Service NZAS James Bird (1883–1946) was invited in 1919 by Scott-Paine to join Supermarine as a director. A qualified marine architect he had previously been supervising contracts being undertaken by various companies in the Solent area for the RNAS.

In the summer of 1919 William Hargreaves left to work for Vospers and later in the year Mitchell at the age of 24 was promoted to succeed him as chief designer. In 1920, Mitchell's role was expanded to include that of chief engineer. In 1927, he was offered and accepted a position on the board as Technical Director. Other than the income from operating commercial flights, the main income between 1919 and 1921 came from selling Channels with a modified design known as the Channel II being developed. As well as sales within Great Britain the company was able to sell 19 overseas, to customers including Chile, Japan, New Zealand, Norway and Sweden.

=== Schneider Trophy 1919 to 1924 ===
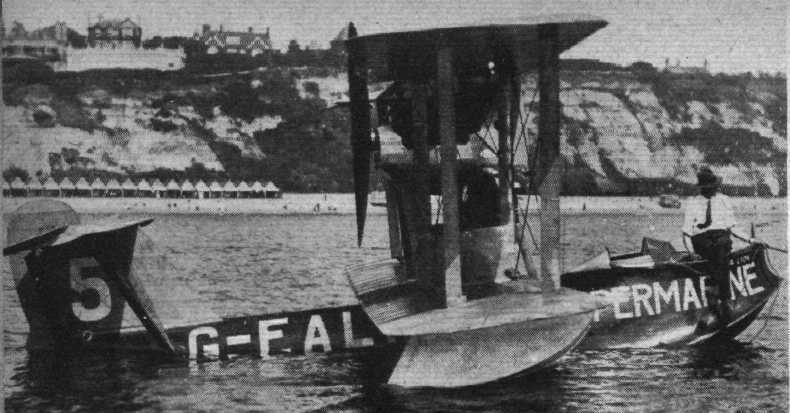
Supermarine Sea Lion I

In 1919 Scott-Paine decided to enter an aircraft from Supermarine in the upcoming 1919 Schneider Trophy seaplane race. A suitable aircraft was produced by heavily modifying N61, the youngest of the two Babys that the company had purchased from the government. Fitted with a Napier Lion engine it was given the name Sea Lion. Flown by Basil Hobbs the aircraft sank on 10 September 1919 after it struck flotsam while competing in the event.

In early 1920 the company developed the Supermarine Sea King a single seat flying boat fighter resembling the Baby and the contemporary Sea Lion racing aircraft. While the prototype of which was exhibited at the Olympia air show but obtained no sales. This was subsequently fitted with new wings and tail surfaces and fitted with a more powerful engine, which Supermarine designating it as the Sea King II. No sales were however forthcoming.

For the 1922 Schneider Trophy contest, which was being held in Naples, Italy, the company modified the Sea King II by increasing the size of the rudder and fin and fitting a more powerful engine which gave a 50 percent increase in power. Designated Sea Lion II the aircraft won the contest and thus stopped the Italians from winning the trophy outright.

With it looking likely that no British company would be entering an aircraft in the 1923 Schneider Trophy contest Scott-Paine was persuaded by the British organizers to enter. As Supermarine being in a poor financial state, Mitchell was restricted to modifying the Sea Lion II, the result which was designated Sea Lion III and proved to be uncompetitive. For the 1924 contest Mitchell began design work on a completely new flying-boat biplane design called the Sea Urchin, which would have been fitted with a Rolls-Royce engine. However, there was insufficient time to overcome a number of design issues which lead to Supermarine withdrawing from the event.

=== Bird takes over ===
In the early 1920s the company developed a series of similar one-off amphibians. The most notable of these was the Seal II, which was a three-seater fleet spotter paid for by the Air Ministry. After it performed well during its evaluation by the RAF, two examples of an improved version, named the Seagull were subsequently purchased by the Air Ministry in 1922. Once these were completed faced with no further orders the company considered closing down part of the factory and laying off staff. Bird approached the Air Ministry for assistance and while he received no orders they were encouraging. At the same time Scott-Paine was close to forming the British Marine Air Navigation Company, which it was expected would place an order for aircraft with Supermarine. In expectation of receiving an order the directors decided not to reduce staff numbers. Meanwhile, to meet the requirements of the expected order Mitchell designed the Sea King in late 1922 to carry six passengers in an enclosed cabin. After receiving confirmation that subsidies would be available from the British government Scott-Paine was able together with Southern Rail and the Asiatic Petroleum to establish the British Marine Air Navigation Company in 1923. They subsequently ordered three Sea Kings, which were used to commence a daily service on 25 September 1923 between Southampton and Guernsey. Then late in 1922 orders were received from the Air Ministry for five Seagull IIs followed by two further orders in early 1923. Later orders for what was called the Seagull III were received in 1925 from the Royal Australian Navy.

Partly due to Scott-Paine's preoccupation with developing the airline business the relationship between him and Bird began to breakdown. As a result, Bird assembled sufficient funds and on 16 November 1923 he confronted Scott-Paine who after negotiation accepted Bird's offer of £192,000 of his shares and left the company.

In 1925 in an attempt to obtain additional funds with which to expand the business the original company was wound up with all creditors paid in full and a new public limited company with the same name was established and listed on the Stock Exchange with a capitalisation rising from £13,500 to £250,000.

In 1926 existing Chief Draughtsman Frank Holroyd was promoted to become Assistant Chief Engineer, while Joseph "Joe" Smith was designated as Chief Draughtsman.

=== Supermarine Southampton ===
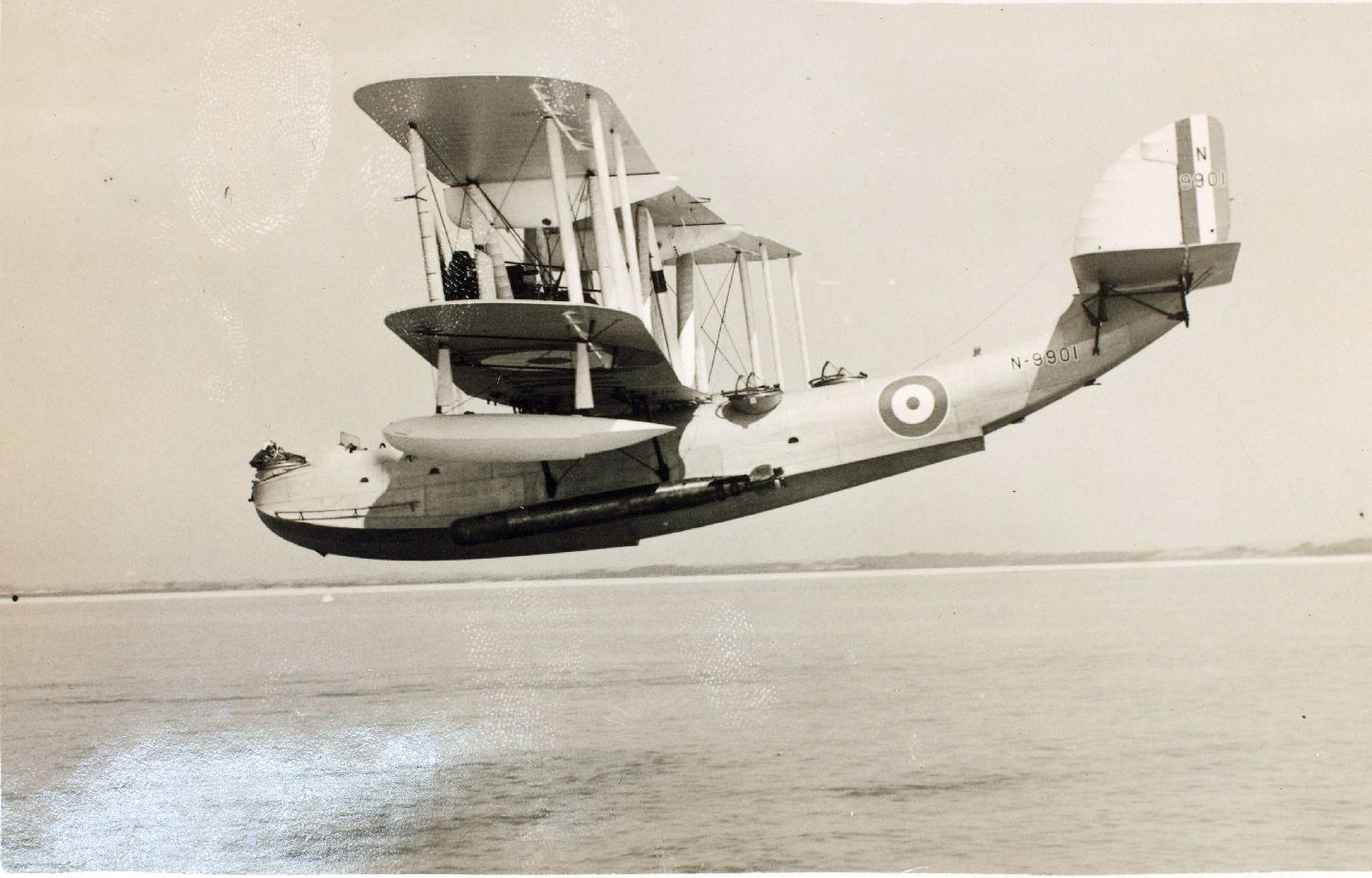
Supermarine Southampton

Looking to expand away from the market for small amphibians and flying boats which was becoming more competitive as Blackburn and Short Brothers entered the market, the company designed large multi-engine flying boats to Air Ministry specifications. As a result, one example was built of the Scylla, a torpedo bomber triplane flying boat to specification 14/21. No orders were forthcoming. One example was also built of the Swan, a twin-engined biplane commercial amphibian to specification 21/22. Capable of carrying 12 passengers it was first flown in March 1924 and tested by the Marine Aircraft Experimental Establishment (MAEE). The Air Ministry was so impressed with the results that they ordered a military derivative to specification 18/24. Six were ordered, subsequently entering service in 1925 as the Southampton. A further orders soon followed. To manufacture the Southampton, which was much larger than their previous designs a new fabrication workshop were built in 1924 and an erection hangar in 1926. Still short of room, in early 1927 the company took out a lease on the Air Ministry's large wartime flying boat assembly and testing facilities at Hythe. Final erection and testing of the Southamptons was then moved to Hythe, which was on the opposite side of the Solent from the Woolston works.

While the Southampton Mk I had wooden hulls, the Air Ministry indicated that they wanted future flying boats to be metal hulled and paid for the construction of a prototype. Compared with wooden hulls, metal hulls were stronger, lighter and did not become heavier over time as the wood soaked up water. To enable them to construct metal hulls Supermarine established a metallurgy department headed by Arthur Black (who joined the company at the end of 1925) and established metal production facilities at their Woolston works. The resulting metal hulled version of the Southampton entered service as the Mk II. The Southampton series was very successful with a total of 83 of all types being built. As a result of the success of the Seagull and Southampton between 1923 and 1927 sales rose from £137,683 to £403,868 and profits from £58,002 to £111,935.

=== Schneider Trophy 1925 to 1927 ===
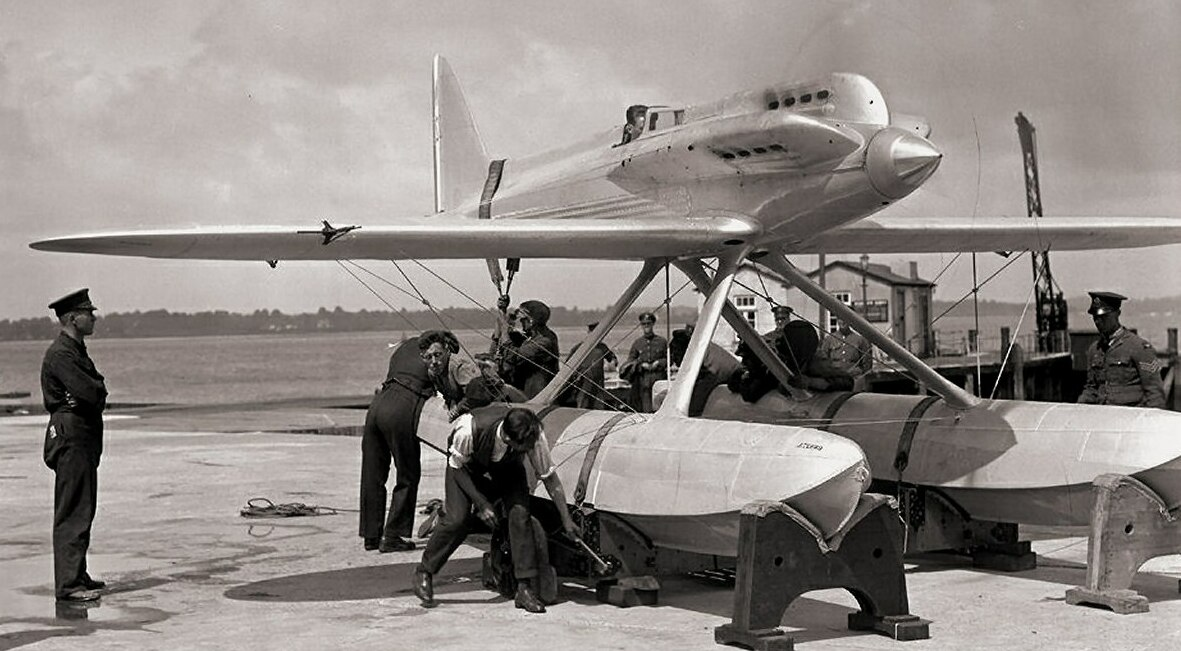
Supermarine S.5 at the Schneider Trophy contest in Venice in 1927

While it had been Scott-Paine' love of speed and competitive nature that had been the driving force behind the company's entry's in the early Schneider Trophy contests, Bird was happy to continue Supermarine's involvement as he wanted to use it to enhance the company profile. After the failure of their 1924 entry, and realizing that other countries designs were far superior, Mitchell reached the conclusion that racing flying boats were no longer competitive. As a result, he designed a monoplane seaplane called the S.4 which was used to set a new world air speed record over Southampton Water of 226.75 mph (364.9 km/h). However the sole example crashed during testing prior to the event, forcing the company to withdraw from the event.

With sponsorship from the Air Ministry, Mitchell began to design a new streamlined monoplane aircraft designated the S.5. Compared with the S.4 which was completely fabricated from wood, the new design had metal floats and fuselage. This was a major risk as at the time Supermarine had no prior experience in metal construction and had still to commission their new metalworking department. Unfortunately as neither the S.5 nor any other design from a British company was ready in time Britain did not enter the 1926 contest. Once the design was finished Supermarine received an order in late 1926 for two examples, with an order for a third following in early 1927. The S.5 dominated the 1927 contest, finishing first and second. The third example crashed killing its pilot while he was attempting to set a new air speed record over the Solent in 1928.

== Supermarine Aviation Works (Vickers) Ltd ==
In the late 1920s Vickers Ltd began a series of divestments and mergers as it attempted to improve the strength and profitability of the group. The most notable was their merger in January 1928 with long term rival Armstrong Whitworth to form Vickers-Armstrongs, with the exception of the Armstrong-Whitworth aircraft division and Armstrong Siddeley motor car division, which were bought out by J. D. Siddeley, and so did not join the new group.

The new Vickers-Armstrong entity retained the existing Vickers aircraft manufacturing division which was restructured as a semi-independent subsidiary called Vickers (Aviation) Ltd under the management of Robert McLean. McLean was tasked with expanding the new company which he undertook by improving the capability of the existing factory and looking for new facilities. Identifying that a manufacturer of flying boats would be good fit with their existing expertise designing and constructing land-based aircraft they evaluated a number of possible acquisitions. Blackburn Aircraft was in poor condition, Saunders was potentially too costly as a consortium headed by A.V. Roe was proposing to purchase them, while Short was too big and diverse. That left Supermarine.

Aware that Supermarine's ability to modernise and expand was limited by a lack of financial resources, Bird and the other directors agreed to sell to Vickers in 1928. Vickers paid £390,000 and renamed it as Supermarine Aviation Works (Vickers) Ltd.

Subsequently, in December 1938, following both Air Ministry's and the Vickers board's concerns over delays to the Spitfire and Wellington manufacturing programmes, all Vickers-Armstrongs aviation interests were reorganised to become Vickers-Armstrongs (Aircraft) Ltd, with both Vickers and Supermarine now under a single management team. Both subsidiaries were then formally wound up, although Supermarine continued to design, build and trade under its own name. The phrase Vickers Supermarine was applied to the aircraft.

Despite selling his shares to Vickers-Armstrongs, Bird stayed on as managing director of Supermarine while Mitchell continued as chief designer. He had signed a 10-year employment contract in 1923, that included a clause that said, if he left Supermarine he could not work for any other competitor without the directors written consent.

While Supermarine was extremely profitable McLean and his management team were of the opinion that as well as wages being higher than at Vickers, it was also not being run efficiently, had poor record keeping, stock control, and was poorly equipped to build all-metal aircraft, with the ratio of unskilled to skilled labour at 1:3 compared with Vickers' 3:1. They therefore saw numerous opportunities to improve the profitability.

One measure Vickers undertook was to send their experienced engineer Barnes Wallis to overhaul the work practices in the design department. He arrived while Mitchell was away on his 1929 Christmas holidays and after installing himself in Mitchell's office began to make changes. Mitchell returned in the New Year, expressed his outrage at Wallis's presumption and immediately moved him to a disused loft in a remote corner of the Woolston works with orders to his staff not to make the interloper comfortable. Wallis eventually complained to McLean, who raised it with the board of Vickers-Armstrongs. Faced with Mitchell's threat to resign if Wallis remained, they backed down and Wallis was recalled to Weybridge.

Shortly after Wallis's departure Major Harold Payn, an engineer from Vickers design department was appointed by Vickers as Mitchell's deputy. A former pilot with experience from World War I, as well as testing aircraft despite little design experience it was hoped that he would be more diplomatic in bringing Supermarine's design office into agreement with Vickers work practices.

That said the parent company provided the combined Vickers (Aviation) Ltd with £250,000 in 1929 to support research and development. As a consequence the capabilities of the design team at Supermarine were expanded by employing among others Alfred Faddy, William Munro (who had expertise in hydrodynamics and metal hull construction) and Beverley Shenstone who was the first academically trained aerodynamicist at Supermarine. As a consequence the services of Mitchell's deputy Frank Holroyd were no longer required and he was dismissed. By 1931 the restructuring of the company ended with Mitchell still technical director and reporting to him, the Technical Office under Alan Clifton and the Drawing Office under Joe Smith.

Vickers' own pilots took over test flying, which led to Henry Biard's role as Supermarine's test pilot since 1919 coming to an end. As a result, he left in 1933.

Trevor Westbrook, a 28-year-old and relatively inexperienced protégé of Robert McLean, was installed as Works Manager with a brief to improve the factory. His direct and forthright manner was not met with universal approval by the staff, but under his direction the factory was rebuilt, rationalised and extended, while the production methods were improved. In 1937 he was promoted within the Vickers group and left Supermarine. He was succeeded at Supermarine by H.B. Pratt.

=== The Depression ===
In response to the onset of the Depression in 1929, with completion of contracts for Southampton running down and no new aircraft orders being received it was necessary to reduce construction staff numbers by a third over the winter of 1930. Vickers supported Supermarine by contracting it to build the wings and undertake the final completion of two Vickers Viastra airliners and then employing it to construct a special version called the Viastra X, for the Prince of Wales. The other notable work was the design of the Type 179, a six-engined flying boat, which led to the company being awarded a contract to build a prototype. Construction proceeded as far as the construction of the hull before the contract was cancelled.

=== Schneider Trophy 1929 and 1931 ===
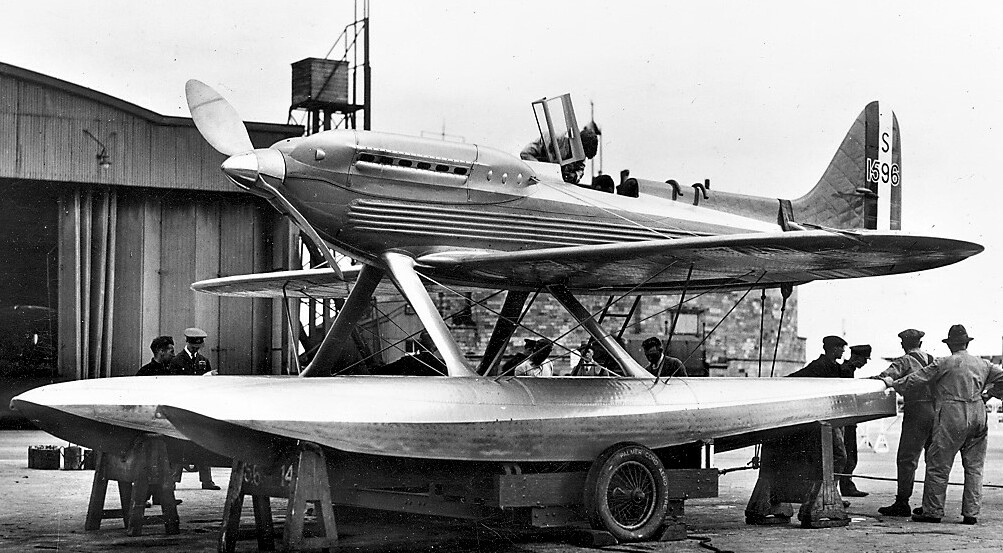
Supermarine S.6B, S1596

For the next contest Mitchell created the all-metal S.6 which featured the smallest possible airframe that he could design around a Rolls-Royce engine instead of the Napier engines used in the S.4 and S.5. This design won the 1929 contest. For the 1931 contest Mitchell created the S.6a, a derivative of the S6. This won the contest and as Britain had won the trophy three times in a row it confirmed Britain as the outright and final winner of the Schneider trophy.

Following the contest a S6b, flown by Flt Lt G. H. Stainforth went on to set a new world air speed record of 407.5 mph.

=== Walrus and Stranraer ===
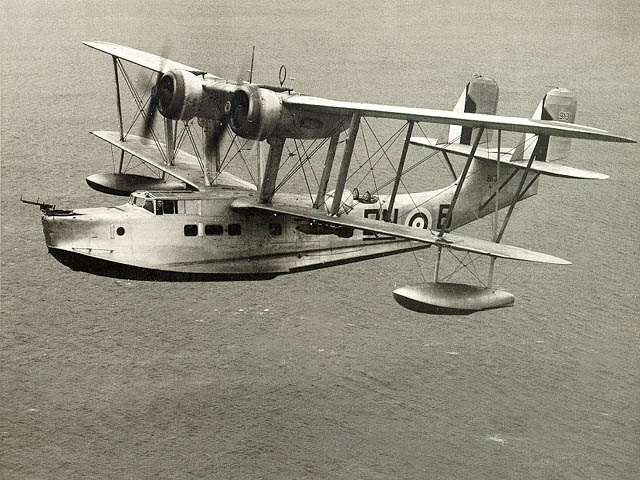
Supermarine Stranraer

In response to a 1929 Royal Australian Air Force (RAAF) requirement for an aircraft to replace their Seagull IIIs, but with the ability to be catapult-launched from cruisers, the company in 1931 designated the Type 223 Seagull V as a private venture and built a prototype. This eventually led to the RAAF placing an order in 1934 for 24 production versions which were designated Type 228 Seagull V. The Royal Navy was impressed by the new design and placed an order for 12 aircraft which were virtually identical except for a more powerful engine. Given the designation Type 236, they entered service as the Walrus. More orders were to follow until a total of 740 were built in all by Supermarine and other firms.

Following on from the Southampton Mk II the company developed the biplane twin-engined Southampton IV in response to specification R.20/31 for a general reconnaissance flying boat. Featuring all-metal construction with fabric covered flying surfaces, it had an enclosed cockpit. The prototype first flew in July 1932. Renamed the Scapa fifteen were built.

Soon after the design of the Scapa was finalised, the Air Ministry issued specification R.24/31 for a twin-engined general purpose flying boat, in response to which Supermarine developed the Stranraer. The prototype first flew in July 1934 and they entered service from April 1937, with the last being delivered to the RAF in 1939. Vickers in Canada also built them for the Royal Canadian Air Force.

=== Supermarine Spitfire ===
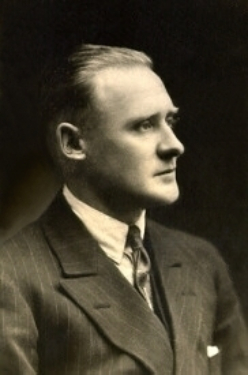
R.J. Mitchell

In 1930, the Air Ministry began formulating the requirements for an advanced high-performance fighter which were spelled out in specification F.7/30, which was in turn issued in the autumn of 1931 to a number of aircraft manufacturers. Among them was Supermarine, who were keen to broaden its product range from seaplanes and flying boats. In response to the specification, Mitchell designed the Type 224, an all-metal monoplane design, with an open cockpit, un-braced cranked wing and fixed undercarriage. A single prototype was built and first flew in February 1934. Flight testing however identified that it had only average performance and so Supermarine received no production contract.

Unhappy at how the Type 224 had turned out, in July 1934 Mitchell commenced designing what he hoped would be a much improved fighter, which was given the designation Type 300. It was much more streamlined than the Type 224, with a shorter wing, retractable undercarriage and an enclosed cockpit. Mitchell continued to evolve the design, striving for the maximum performance he could get from the engine and airframe combination. In November 1934 the design was further revised to accommodate the promising new Rolls-Royce PV.XII (PV-12) engine, which was later named the Merlin. The estimated performance of the new design was such that McLean approved in November 1934 expenditure on detailed design of a prototype, as he was confident that funding of a prototype was extremely likely from what was a supportive Air Ministry. Within a month of receiving the initial data, the Air Ministry issued specification F.37/34 to cover the construction of a prototype Type 300.

Given the name Spitfire by the Vickers board, the prototype Type 300 when it first flew on 5 March 1936 at nearby Eastleigh airport marked a revolutionary advance for the RAF. The Air Ministry was so impressed that on 3 June 1936 it ordered 310 of the fighter aircraft.

The earlier Hawker Hurricane and the Spitfire were the mainstay of RAF Fighter Command fighter aircraft which fought off the Luftwaffe bombing raids with fighter escorts during the Battle of Britain in the summer of 1940. While the Hurricane was available in larger numbers and consequently played a larger role, the new Spitfire became adored by both the public and its pilots and became the aircraft associated with the battle. It went on to play a major part in the remainder of the war, in a number of variants and marks, and it was the only allied fighter aircraft to be in production through the entirety of the Second World War.

The Spitfire went out of service in 1954.

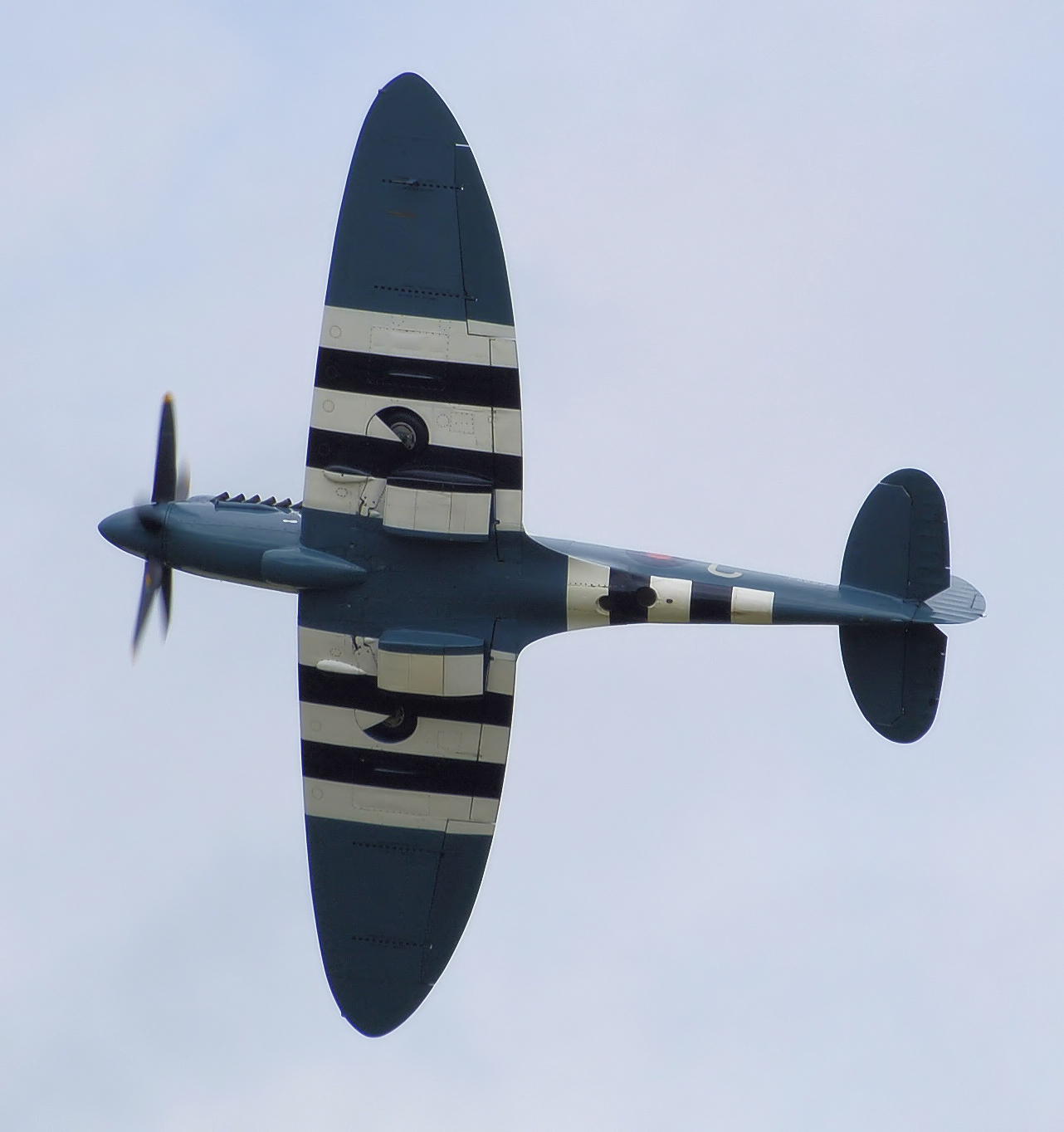
Supermarine Spitfire Mk.XIX in 2008

=== Increasing production capacity ===
At the time of receiving its first order for the Spitfire the company did not have the management skills, organisation tools and physical space as this one order was more than double the total number of aircraft they had built in the previous 20 years. As a result, much of the work had to be sub-contracted to other firms, which led to chaos with drawings and the delivery of parts. To compound the problem skilled sheet-metal workers were in short supply. Supermarine had contracted to deliver the first Spitfire in September 1937, but by early 1938 not a single plane had left the factory. Upon receipt of the order Supermarine commenced fitting out its Woolston Works for production of the new fighter. With the orders for the Spitfire as well as for the Stranraer and Walrus, the company built a new factory to the designs of the noted 1930's modernist architect Oliver Percy Bernard. The new factory was known as the Itchen Works and was built on land reclaimed from the Itchen, just upstream from the Woolston Works. Opened in 1939, it was originally intended that it would be used to build the Walrus and Sea Otter, but because of its importance it was soon being used to construct Spitfire fuselages.

In 1938 with Walrus production having peaked the previous year the facility at Hythe was closed.

While it was intended that outside sub-contractors would be employed in manufacturing many major components, Vickers-Armstrongs was initially reluctant to see companies from outside of the group involved and so was slow in releasing the necessary sub-components and drawings. As delays mounted the Air Ministry proposed that Supermarine would only complete the initial order and then once the Hawker Typhoon was ready for service in 1941 switch over to making Bristol Beaufighters. Supermarine was able to convince the Air Ministry that the problems would be overcome, which allayed the concerns sufficient for them to receive another order for 200 Spitfires on 24 March 1938. Supermarine was to subsequently organise over 200 sub-contractors to produce components for the Spitfire, with 27 of them producing fully assembled major components, four building the main section of the wing, four building wing tips and another five building flaps. The major components were then taken on trucks to Eastleigh Aerodrome where fitting of the engines, final assembly and flight testing was undertaken before being distributed to operational RAF bases.

Due to the production delays, the first RAF unit, No. 19 Squadron at RAF Duxford, did not start receiving Spitfire Mk Is until 4 August 1938. Even then, production was slow to build up, and only 49 Spitfires had reached the RAF by 1 January 1939. By 3 September 1939 a total of 306 Spitfire Mk Is had been delivered to the RAF.

=== Castle Bromwich ===
Aware of the desperate shortage of modern aircraft, the lack of manufacturing capacity and that as the majority of aircraft manufacturers were located in the south of England, which made them vulnerable to enemy air attack, the British government in 1935 commenced the "Shadow Factory" programme. These massive new "Shadow Factories", which it was intended would employ the latest production techniques, were to be set up in areas away from the immediate threat of attack and where it was felt there would be sufficient transferable skills which could be employed on the manufacturing process. For the Spitfire, Lord Nuffield offered to build the massive Castle Bromwich Shadow Factory near Birmingham. Work began on its construction on 12 July 1938. However continual problems beset the factory and despite it having been planned that it would be producing 60 aircraft per week by April 1940 it was not until June 1940 (well into the Battle of Britain) that the problems were resolved by new management, with the first 10 Spitfires being delivered that month. Thereafter production increased to reach a maximum rate of 320 aircraft per month. By the end of the war it had produced a total of 12,129 aircraft (which was over half of all Spitfires made).

=== Heavy bomber ===
In response to Air Ministry specification B.12/36, which was issued in July 1936 to all the major aircraft manufacturers for a four-engined heavy bomber, Mitchell designed the Type 316 which carried its bombs in both the fuselage and wings. After submitting the Supermarine proposal, Mitchell in characteristic fashion began a total redesign called the Type 317 with new wings and different gun turrets. Two prototypes of the Type 317 with Bristol Hercules engines were ordered on 22 March 1937 but since Short Brothers had experience with large four engined aircraft and Supermarine had none and had to deliver the Spitfire, Shorts design submission to B.12/36 had already been selected for redesign as a back up in February 1937. Supermarine also proceeded with design work on a variant (Type 318) with Merlin engines until they were told in July to stop work on it to concentrate on the Type 317.

Following the death of Mitchell in June 1937 after a long battle with cancer and with Supermarine having problems meeting the demand for the Spitfire the Air Ministry realised that work on the prototypes would be delayed. Two prototypes were ordered from Short Brothers, followed by a production order in April 1938 and their design entered service as the Short Stirling in January 1941.

The Type 317 prototypes were destroyed, along with construction drawings, by an air raid on 26 September 1940 while still under construction. The Air Ministry cancelled the contract on 25 November.

=== Death of Mitchell ===
Following the death of Mitchell, his deputy Harold Payn was appointed Chief Designer. However a security check in September 1939 identified that Payn had a German born wife. Concerns about the risk this posed to a major war programme saw Payn dismissed. Joe Smith was promoted from Chief Draughtsman, at first to acting manager of the design department and finally to chief designer in 1941 following approval from the Ministry of Aircraft Production.

=== World War II ===
In 1940 Bird retired as general manager and was superseded by W.T. Elliot.

Upon the commencement of the war to protect the Supermarine factory at Woolston, anti-aircraft guns were placed at Peartree Green, the Railway Bridge and Taggarts Wharf.

At the time completed Spitfire wings and fuselages were taken on lorries from the Woolston and Itchen works, to the assembly hangar at Eastleigh Airport where the Merlin engines were fitted and the assembled aircraft tested. Under the supervision of works manager H.B. Pratt, a partial dispersal of Spitfire production away from the works at Woolston also begun. However, the production delays at Castle Bromwich meant that Supermarine could not afford any interruption in production at Woolston and Itchen which constrained dispersal. However progress was made on identifying suitable sites and requisitioning them.

To allow Supermarine to concentrate on Spitfires, Saunders-Roe on the Isle of Wight took on the manufacture of the Walrus and Sea Otter.

==== Air raids ====
The Supermarine factory and the Thornycroft naval shipyard (building destroyers, near the Woolston works) made Southampton a prime target for the Luftwaffe. Shortly after 5.30pm on the evening of 15 September 1940, the factory was directly attacked by eighteen Me 110s, each carrying two bombs. Only a few windows were broken, though nine people were killed in nearby houses.

The raid brought home that immediate action was now needed to disperse production. The buildings that had been sitting idle were prepared, and tools and jigs were gradually moved from Woolston and Itchen to the new facilities.

The Commercial and Personnel departments (which included payroll) moved to Deepdene House in Bitterne. This was fortunate as it allowed workers to receive emergency pay following later raids, when it was desperately needed, as the homes of many were destroyed by bombs.

On 24 September 1940, the works were attacked by 17 aircraft at 1.50pm and again by three aircraft at 4.15pm. The initial raid of Bf 110s was led by Martin Lutz of TG210, and by flying low and fast achieved complete surprise, with the workforce receiving little warning of the raid. Twenty-nine high explosive bombs and one incendiary were dropped. There was little damage to the factory as most of the 17 bombs which fell on the site landed in the mud of the river. However, 42 were killed and 161 injured, many when the railway bridge, under which workers were still making their way to air raid shelters, received a direct hit, as did one of the already occupied bomb shelters beneath a railway embankment, where 24 were killed and 75 injured. Also many nearby houses were destroyed with terrible loss of life. Works manager H.B. Pratt was wounded and badly traumatised by the attack.

Two days later, on 26 September, sixty Heinkel He 111s of KG 55 escorted by 60 Messerschmitt Bf 110 fighters of ZG 26 attacked from 5.45pm onwards in two waves. The incoming attack was detected early, with factory sirens sounding just after 4pm, which gave the workers ample time to evacuate. In spite of anti-aircraft fire more than 70 tons of bombs were dropped, with seven bombs directly hitting the Woolston works and one hitting the Itchen works. The factory buildings at Woolston were so badly damaged that they were never rebuilt, and the ruins were at one stage used to train commandos in street fighting. Both prototypes of the Type 317 bomber and three complete Spitfires were destroyed, while over 20 Spitfires were damaged. Luckily, several of the critical production jigs had already been moved to other sites and the remainder of the most important precision machines were virtually undamaged. One bomb scored a direct hit on a bomb shelter, but it was unoccupied as – after the experience of previous raid – many of the employees had run well away from the factory area. Even so, 55 were killed and 92 injured.

==== Complete dispersal of production ====
By this time the new factory at Castle Bromwich was producing Spitfires, but with a desperate need for more aircraft Lord Beaverbrook, the Minister of Aircraft Production (MAP), visited Southampton and immediately ordered a complete dispersal of Supermarine's facilities. The top floor of the Polygon Hotel in the centre of Southampton was immediately requisitioned by the MAP for the use of Supermarine's production team.

Work immediately began by the production team under the leadership of the company's works engineer, Leonard G. Gooch on a dispersal programme. Gooch's impressive efforts meant that by December 1940 he formally replaced Pratt as Works Manager. The replacement of Pratt is also believed to have been partially orchestrated by Beaverbrook in retaliation for Pratt's refusal prior to the air raids to allow staff from the MAP into the Supermarine factories without the proper credentials. Pratt, overworked and suffering from depression, committed suicide soon afterwards.

During 26 September air raid at least one bomb had passed through the drawing office, out of the window and into the mud on the river bank below; another went straight through the floor without exploding. As a result, the majority of the design material and drawings survived. The design team were quickly moved to temporary accommodation in old World War I army huts, being used by the University College in Highfield. One of the huts was then destroyed by an incendiary bomb prompting a further move beginning 7 December 1940 when all of the company's design, production and administration was moved to a new permanent home at Hursley House. Located close to Winchester, this large stately house was requisitioned by the Ministry of Aircraft Production from the Dowager Lady Mary Cooper, who remained in residence until June 1942.

It was decided that new dispersed facilities should stay within 50 miles of Southampton so that control and communication could be maintained. By mid November 1940, 35 workshops were up and running. Eventually there were 250 sub-contractors supplying 60 workshops in Hampshire, Wiltshire and Berkshire, clustered around four production centres: Reading (with assembly at Aldermaston and Henley), Salisbury (with assembly at Chattis Hill and High Post), Southampton (with assembly at Eastleigh) and Trowbridge (with assembly at Keevil). An additional area around Winchester and Chandler's Ford was linked to the main design base at Hursley Park.

Each production centre had workshops able to make each part of the plane and an airfield at which final assembly and delivery could be performed. The smallest assembly centre was High Post where the assembly hangar was so small that only three Spitfires could be assembled at a time. Production was six a week. Castle Bromwich concentrated on the standard models of Spitfires, including the Mk II, V, IX and XIV, as it was time-consuming to change its mass assembly production lines from one model to another. In contrast the dispersed production and small output from each individual production centre surrounding Southampton had the advantage of allowing flexibility and responsiveness without major disruption to the overall production. Each production centre tended to specialise on a particular model of Spitfire and so could much more quickly provide smaller numbers of specialised aircraft in response to a new threat or requirement of the RAF and Royal Navy.

The Southampton workforce increased from 2,880 at the start of the war to 3,660 in September 1940, dropped to 3,079 in December 1940 as a result of the air raid before increasing to 10,000 (half of them women) by the end of 1944.

When looking for suitable sites, preference was placed on buildings with wide concrete floors, uncluttered by pillars, with high ceilings and large access doors. While garages, vehicle showrooms and other workshops were capable of constructing sub-assemblies and even complete fuselages, bus depots with their extra height were valued for the making of wings. Many local garages and large store premises were requisitioned to provide the required facilities. Among the buildings requisitioned were Carey & Lambert's showroom at Austin House in Southampton, Chiswell's Garage, Elliott's furniture factory in Newbury, Hendy's Garage, off Pound Tree Road in the centre of Southampton, Hendy's Agricultural Equipment Showroom at Chandlers Ford, Lowthers Garage on Park Road in Shirley, Seward's Garage, on Winchester Road in Shirley, Shorts Garage, Southampton, Sunlight Laundry also on Winchester Road, and Vincent's Garage in Reading.

While most owners left with little complaint there were some who objected. The Hants and Dorset Bus Depot on Winchester Road in Southampton was already being used to store sandbags and pumps needed by the Fire Brigade in the event of an air raid. The deputy town clerk refused to move the pumps as he considered them to be more important. Eventually sufficient official pressure was brought to bear and the council moved the buses and pumps out, leaving Supermarine with the job of disposing of sandbags. The Mayor of Salisbury initially objected to the takeover of the city's bus depot until it was pointed out to him by MAP that as the local patron of the Spitfire Fund, it was no use collecting money if there was nowhere to build the aircraft. Near Trowbridge the owner of the Barnes steamroller factory on Church Street in Southwick thought his steamrollers were more important and appealed to his local MP. An arbitration panel ruled that Supermarine could have 75% of the factory; a wall was built to separate the two activities. Later a large purpose-built facility was built on Bradley Road in Trowbridge, where the main body and wing were made, and parts incorporated from other Trowbridge factories added, before being transported on trucks to Keevil Airfield. In a hangar at Keevil the Spitfire would be assembled, tested and then flown by an ATA (Air Transport Auxiliary) pilot to a frontline airfield.

Often there were also conflicts with other Ministries, who had already requisitioned sites needed by Supermarine, but the Ministry for Aircraft Production usually ruled supreme as the production of aircraft had the highest priority.

Production fell from 363 aircraft in the quarter before the raids to 177 and 179 respectively in the next two quarters. It took another nine months before it was back to 100 per month, as the programme both had to find suitable new facilities, sufficient skilled workers to replace those killed and wounded and also the additional numbers needed to increase production, while at the same time provide accommodation for them. There was a great reluctance of Southampton-based workers to move away to the new dispersal facilities. Once the existing skilled workers were relocated it took time to train new semi-skilled workers. Many were straight out of school or older men who had undergone the Government's basic engineering training. As the war progressed more woman entered the workforce and began to take on more senior roles. By the end of the war, 8,000 planes had been built in the dispersal factories around Southampton.

In addition to the Spitfires and Seafires made at Supermarine's dispersed Southampton factories and at Castle Bromwich, several companies were subcontracted to make entire Supermarine designs. The most significant were Westland Aircraft who were responsible for the manufacture of the majority of the Seafire, making over 2,000, while Cunliffe-Owen Aircraft at their shadow factory at Eastleigh from 1942 converted 118 Spitfires VBs into Seafires before constructing over 520 new Seafires.

==== New designs ====
Joe Smith was confident that the Spitfire had great development potential and was successful in obtaining the maximum capability from the Spitfire and its naval version the Seafire through numerous variants, including the introduction of the Rolls-Royce Griffon-engined series, all of which ensured that it remained a front line fighter until the end of World War II.

By 1942, the designers had realised that the characteristics of the Spitfire's wing at high Mach numbers might become a limiting factor in further increasing the aircraft's high-speed performance. As a result, work commenced on the Spiteful and Seafang, which were designed to be successors of the Spitfire and Seafire, respectively. However, with the advent of jet propulsion, the future of high-performance fighters was clearly with the jet fighter, so only a small number were built.

=== Post-World War II ===
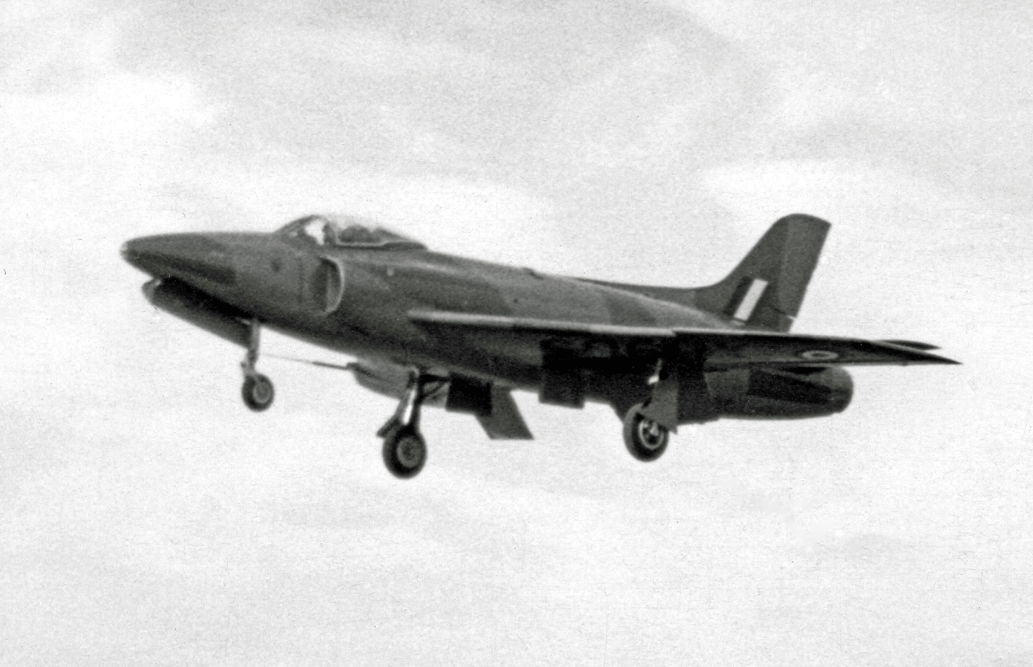
Swift FR.5, Farnborough air show, 1955

Following the end of the war with no further need for dispersal of production the Itchen works was rebuilt but not the Woolston works. The manufacturing facilities were split into the Southern (Chilbolton, Eastleigh, Hursley and Itchen) under Leonard Gooch and Northern (South Marston and Trowbridge) under Stuart Lefevre.

With little demand for flying boats and lacking expertise in large multi-engined aircraft Supermarine concentrated on jet fighters, building the Royal Navy's first jet fighter, the Supermarine Attacker. To expedite its development Smith used the wings of Spiteful mated to a new fuselage housing a Nene engine. It served front line squadrons aboard aircraft carriers and RNVR squadrons at shore bases. The Attacker was followed by the more advanced Swift which served in the fighter and photo-reconnaissance roles.

The last aircraft to bear the Supermarine name was the Scimitar, the final examples of which were delivered in 1957.

In the late 1950s Supermarine became engaged in non-aviation related work ranging from film equipment to hovercraft (from 1961). The Vickers-Armstrongs VA-3 hovercraft which was constructed in the reconstructed Itchen works.

In the consolidation of British aircraft manufacturing in the late 1950s, Vickers-Armstrongs (Aircraft) became a part of the British Aircraft Corporation in 1960 and the individual manufacturing heritage names were lost.

A separate Supermarine design office continued to exist at Weybridge until 1957 when many staff were absorbed into the main Vickers-Armstrongs organisation or relocated to the new Supermarine headquarters at South Marston in Wiltshire. In response to government specification GOR.339, Vickers-Armstrongs whose design team largely consisted of ex-Supermarine engineers (based in Weybridge) offered the Type 571. This design was eventually merged with that proposed by English-Electric/Short design to create the final design for the BAC TSR-2.

== Representation in media ==
Premiering in February 2018 at NST City in Southampton Howard Brenton's play The Shadow Factory told the story of the impact of the air raids on the Supermarine factory in 1940. The production starred David Birrell (Fred/Hugh), Catherine Cusack (Lil/Sylvia), Lorna Fitzgerald (Jackie Dimmock), Hilton McRae (Lord Beaverbrook) and Daniel York (Len Gooch).

== Memorials ==
The former Woolston Works is today the site of an aggregate unloading wharf and an apartment block. Only the pre-cast reinforced concrete slipway still exists – designed by noted modernist architect Oliver Bernard in 1936/37 together with the much expanded factory and Grade II Listed since 27 June 2011. A nearby memorial plaque remembers those who died during the three air raids in 1940 that targeted the Supermarine works.

== Reuse of the Supermarine name ==
The name was revived in 1990 by a company in Burslem called Supermarine Aero Engineering Ltd. that hand builds parts for Spitfire planes.

Northshore Marine Motor Yachts builds a range of motorboats under the Supermarine name in Itchenor near Chichester, England. The name is also used for Spitfire replicas made by an Australian company in Cisco, Texas.

== Supermarine aircraft ==
Initially, the company had no system for naming projects with a structured system only coming into use just prior to the company being purchased by Vickers-Armstrongs. The new owners imposed the Vickers' system where once a new project was approved for further work a Type number was allocated. Vickers initially assigned a block of Type numbers from 178 to 190 to Supermarine.

- Pemberton-Billing P.B.1 (1914)
- Pemberton-Billing P.B.7
- Pemberton-Billing P.B.9
- Pemberton-Billing P.B.23 – A single-seater pusher biplane.
- Pemberton-Billing P.B.25 (1915) – A revised version of the P.B.23.
- Pemberton-Billing P.B.29
- AD Flying Boat (1916)
- AD Navyplane (1916)
- Supermarine Nighthawk (1917) – Anti-Zeppelin fighter aircraft.
- Supermarine Baby (1917) – Single-seater fighter flying boat.
- Supermarine Sea Lion I (1919) – Schneider race flying boat.
- Supermarine Sea Lion II and III (1922)
- Supermarine Channel (1919) – Civil version of the AD Flying Boat.
- Supermarine Scylla early (1920s)
- Supermarine Sea Urchin early (1920s)
- Supermarine Commercial Amphibian (1920)
- Supermarine Sea King (1920) – Single-seater fighter flying boat.
- Supermarine Seagull (1921) – Amphibian Fleet Spotter.
- Supermarine Seal II (1921)
- Supermarine Sea Eagle (1923) – Civil amphibian flying boat.
- Supermarine Scarab (1924) – Military version of Sea Eagle.
- Supermarine Sheldrake
- Supermarine Swan (1924) – Experimental amphibian.
- Supermarine Sparrow (1924) – Two-seater ultralight.
- Supermarine Southampton (1925) – Flying boat.
- Supermarine S.4 (1925) – Schneider Trophy race seaplane.
- Supermarine S.5 (1927) – Schneider Trophy race seaplane.
- Supermarine Nanok (1927)
- Supermarine Solent (1927)
- Supermarine Seamew (1928) – Twin-engined flying boat.
- Supermarine S.6 (1929) – Schneider Trophy race seaplane.
- Type 171 Southampton X (1928)

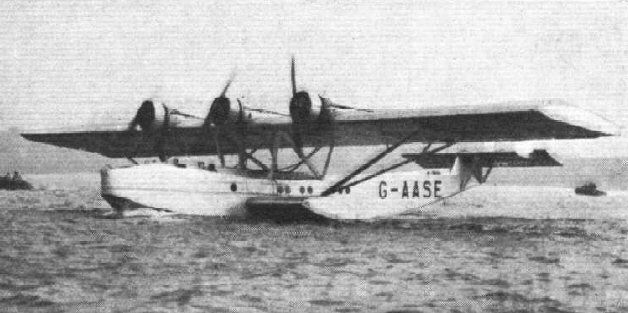
Supermarine Air-Yacht

- Supermarine Air Yacht (1931) – Six-passenger flying boat.
- Supermarine Type 179 (1931) – Six-engine transport flying-boat.
- Supermarine S6A – Refurbished S.6 with new floats.
- Supermarine S.6B (1931) – Schneider Trophy race (first aircraft over 400 mph)
- Supermarine Scapa (1932) – Flying boat.
- Supermarine Seagull V – Amphibian fleet spotter.
- Supermarine Stranraer (1932) – General-purpose flying boat.
- Supermarine Walrus (1933) – Amphibian fleet spotter.
- Supermarine Type 224 (1934) – Unsuccessful design for a fighter aircraft to Air Ministry specification F.7/30.
- Supermarine Spitfire (1936) – Single-seat fighter.
- Supermarine Seafire (1941) – Single-seater carrier-based fighter version of the Spitfire.
- Supermarine Sea Otter (1938) – Flying boat.
- Type 322 also S.24/37 (1939) – Naval Dive-Bomber prototype. Nicknamed 'Dumbo' this was an unsuccessful prototype wooden dive-bomber with variable incidence wing. Used as a design test-bed.
- Supermarine Spiteful (1944) – Replacement for the Spitfire.
- Supermarine Seafang (1946) – Naval development of Spiteful.

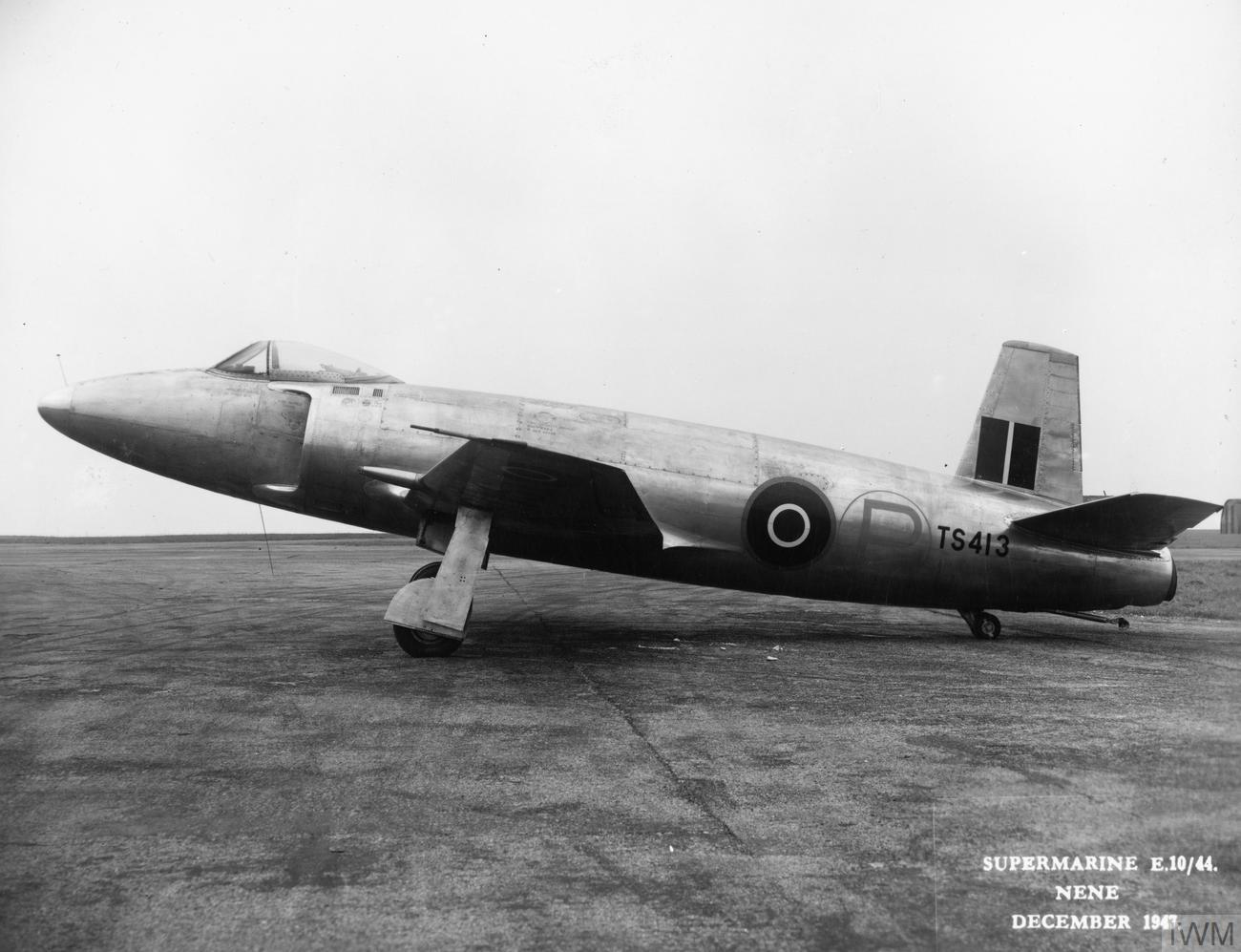
Supermarine Attacker TS413 on the ground 1947

- Supermarine Attacker (1946) – Jet fighter.
- Supermarine Seagull ASR-1 (1948) – Air-sea rescue and reconnaissance.
- Type 508 (1951) – Twin Nene engined fighter prototype with Attacker wings and a V-tail which initially had no undercarriage as it was designed to Naval specification for "mat" landings on aircraft carriers.
- Type 510 (1948) – Prototype which had an Attacker fuselage fitted with swept wings and tail surfaces. It was the first fully swept wing aircraft to land on an aircraft carrier
- Supermarine 521 (1950) – Modified Attacker fuselage as basis for Handley Page HP.88.
- Type 535 (1950) – Swift predecessor with Nene engine.
- Supermarine Swift (1951) – Jet fighter.
- Type 525 (1954) – Similar to the Type 529 but with swept wings and conventional tail arrangement. Immediate predecessor of Scimitar.
- Type 545 – Supersonic version of the Swift. Prototype built but cancelled before flown.

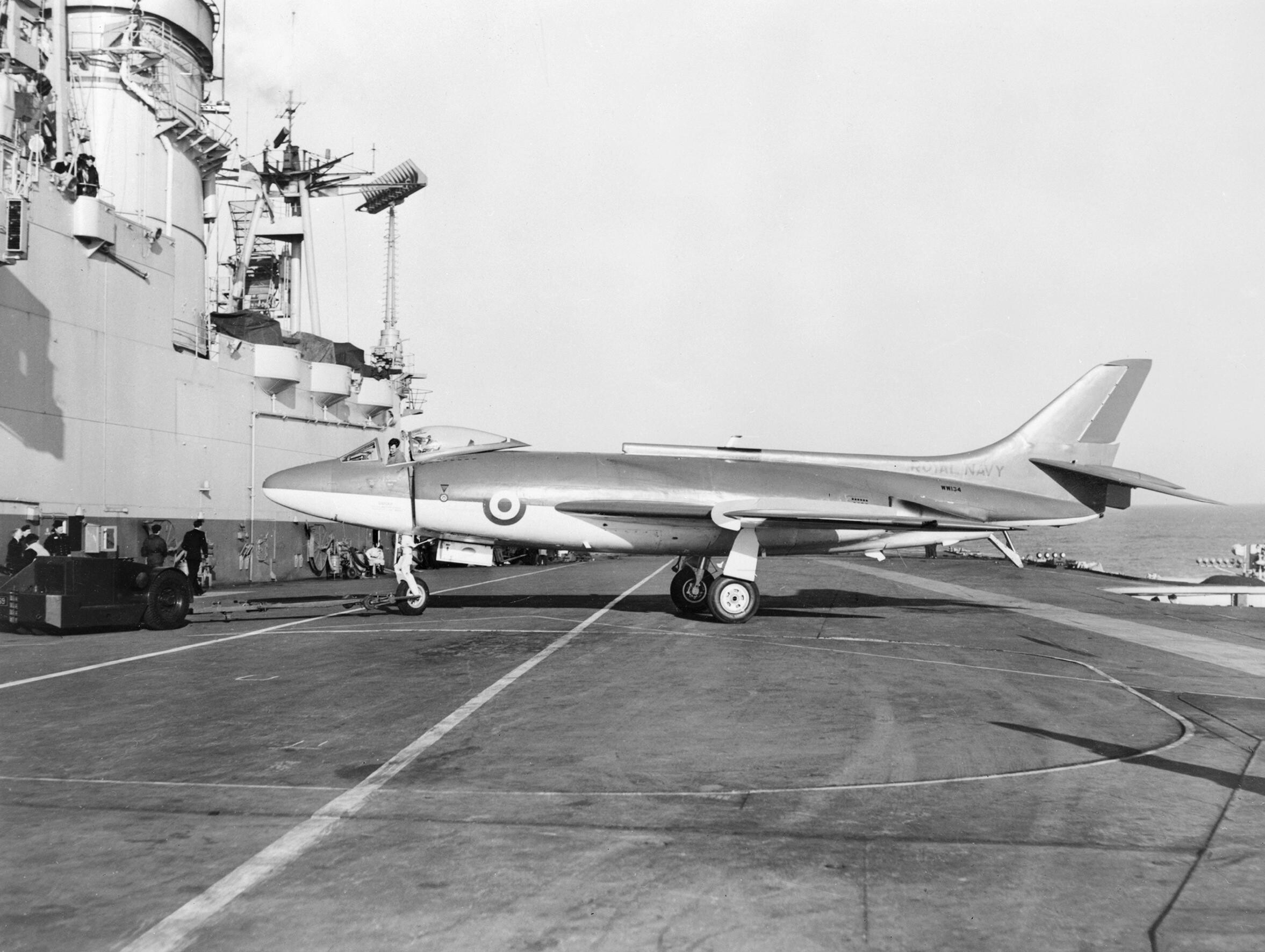
Supermarine Scimitar on HMS Ark Royal (R09) c1957

- Supermarine Scimitar (1956) – Naval ground attack aircraft.

=== Designs and submissions only ===
- Supermarine Type 178 00 (1929) – Sea Hawk three-engined civilian flying boat.
- Supermarine Type 178 01 (1931) – Monoplane civilian mail carrier.
- Supermarine Type 178 02 (1931) – Single-engine bomber and reconnaissance amphibian.
- Supermarine Type 178 03 (1931) – Twin-engined air mail flying boat.
- Supermarine Type 178 04 (1931) – Twin-engined Southampton flying boat.
- Supermarine Type 178 05 (1931) – Twin-engined flying boat.
- Supermarine Type 178 06 (1931) – Sea Hawk three-engined biplane flying boat.
- Supermarine Type 178 07 (1931) – Southampton IV.
- Supermarine Type 178 08 (1931) – Proposal to reduce landing speed of the S.6b.
- Supermarine Type 178 09 (1931) – High performance day bomber.
- Supermarine Type 178 10 (1931) – Single-seater day and night fighter.
- Supermarine Type 178 11 (1932) – Three-engined monoplane flying boat. Known as the Military Air Yacht.
- Supermarine Type 178 12 (1932) – Single-seater biplane day and night fighter. Modified from the Type 178 10.
- Supermarine Type 178 14 (1932) – Single-seater monoplane day and night fighter. Modified from the Type 178 10.
- Supermarine Type 180 (1929) – Four-engined civilian flying boat.
- Supermarine Type 182 (1931) – General purpose civilian high-wing monoplane.
- Supermarine Type 183 (1931) – General purpose civilian low-wing monoplane.
- Supermarine Type 232 (1934) – Four-engined flying boat to Air Ministry specification R.2/33.
- Supermarine Type 238 (1934) – Biplane flying boat to Air Ministry specification R.2/33.
- Supermarine Type 239 (1934) – Four-engined flying boat to Air Ministry specification R.2/33.
- Supermarine Type 240 (1934) – Twin-engined coastal reconnaissance landplane.
- Supermarine Type 302 (1935) – Four-engine flying boat for Imperial Airways
- Supermarine Type 305 (1935) – Two-seater day and night fighter with all four guns in a turret to Air Ministry specification F.9/35.
- Supermarine Type 306 (1935) – Four-engined high wing monoplane flying boat.
- Supermarine Type 307 (1935) – Seagull V with Pegasus VI engine.
- Supermarine Type 308 (1935) – Long range flying boat to Air Ministry specification R.12/35.
- Supermarine Type 310 (1935) – Long range flying boat.
- Supermarine Type 312 (1936) – Single seat day and night fighter to Air Ministry specification F37/35.
- Supermarine Type 313 (1936) – Single seat day and night fighter to Air Ministry specification F37/35.
- Supermarine Type 314 (1936) – High performance flying boat to Air Ministry specification R.1/36.
- Supermarine Type 315 (1936) – Walrus for Argentina.
- Supermarine Type 316 (1937) – Four-engined heavy bomber to Air Ministry specification B12/36. Redesigned as 317.
- Supermarine Type 317 (1937) – Four-engined heavy bomber with Hercules engines to Air Ministry specification B12/36. Abandoned after prototypes destroyed by German bombing attack.
- Supermarine Type 318 (1937) – Four-engined heavy bomber with Merlin engines variant of Type 317 to Air Ministry specification B12/36. Design work cancelled at Air Ministry request
- Supermarine Type 319 (1937) – Two-seater turret fighter, developed from F11/37
- Supermarine Type 305 (1938) – Design submission for turret fighter to F.9/35 based on F.37/34 (Spitfire).
- Supermarine Type 323 (1938) – Speed Spitfire.
- Supermarine Type 324 (1938) – Twin Merlin engined, tricycle undercarriage fighter based on Spitfire wing and fuselage to Air Ministry specification F18/37.
- Supermarine Type 325 (1938) – Twin-engined fighter to Air Ministry specification F18/37. Version of the Type 324 but with two pusher engines.
- Supermarine Type 327 (1938) – High speed single-seater pusher fighter to Air Ministry specification F18/37.
- Supermarine Type 328 (1939) – Flying boat to Air Ministry specification R.5/39.
- Supermarine Type 333 (1939) – Two-seater fleet fighter to Air Ministry specification N9/39.
- Supermarine Type 334 (1939) – Submission to Air Ministry specification S6/39.
- Supermarine Type 391 (1944) – Submission to Air Ministry for a Roll-Royce Eagle powered carrier-borne fighter.
- Supermarine Type 553 (1953) – Mach 2 research aircraft project to ER.134T.
- Supermarine Type 559 (1955) – Submission for Operational Requirement F.155 for a high altitude supersonic fighter.
- Supermarine Type 571 – Submission for GOR.339 TSR.2 requirement.

== Sources ==
- Andrews, C.F.; Morgan, E.B. (1987). Supermarine Aircraft Since 1914, Second edition (Hardback). London: Putnam. ISBN 978-0-85177-800-6.
- Beaver, Paul (2015). Spitfire People : The men and women who made the Spitfire the aviation icon (Hardback). Sherborne, Dorset: Evro Publishing. ISBN 978-1-9105050-5-2.
- Bruce, J.M. (1969). War Planes of the First World War: Volume Three: Fighters. London: Macdonald & Co. ISBN 978-0-356-01490-6.
- Buttler, Tony (2004). Fighters & Bombers 1935-1950. British Secret Projects: Volume 3. Midland Publishing. ISBN 978-1-910809-17-4.
- Chorlton, Martyn (2012). Supermarine: Company Profile 1913–1963. Cudham, Kent: Kelsey Publishing Group (Aeroplane). ISBN 978-1-90742-646-9.
- Jarrett, Philip (December 1992). "Supermarine Origins Pemberton-Billing Flying Boats". Air Enthusiast. No. Forty–eight. pp. 4–10. ISSN 0143-5450.
- London, Peter (2003). British Flying Boats. Stroud, UK: Sutton Publishing. ISBN 978-0-7509-2695-9.
- McKinstry, Leo (2007). Spitfire: Portrait of a Legend (Paperback). London: John Murray. ISBN 978-0-7195-6875-6.
- Pegram, Ralph (2016). Beyond the Spitfire – The Unseen Designs of R.J. Mitchell (Hardback). Brimscombe Port: The History Press. ISBN 978-0-75096-515-6.
- Phipp, Mike (2013). Flying Boats of the Solent and Poole (E-book). Stroud: Amberley Publishing. ISBN 978-1-44561-305-5.
- Ritchie, Sebastian (1997). Industry and Air Power: The Expansion of British Aircraft Production, 1935–1941 (Hardback). Abington: Routledge. ISBN 978-0-7146-4724-1.
- Shelton, John (2008). Schneider Trophy to Spitfire – The Design Career of R.J. Mitchell (Hardback). Sparkford: Hayes Publishing. ISBN 978-1-84425-530-6.
- Walpole, Nigel (2004). Swift Justice (Hardback). Barnsley: Pen and Sword Aviation. ISBN 978-1-84415-070-0.
