= Pemberton-Billing P.B.9 =

P.B.9

General information
- Type: Single-seat Scout
- National origin: United Kingdom
- Manufacturer: Pemberton-Billing Limited
- Designer: Noel Pemberton-Billing
- Primary user: Royal Naval Air Service
- Number built: 1

History
- First flight: August 1914

The Pemberton-Billing P.B.9 was a First World War British single-seat open cockpit equal-span biplane scout aircraft built by Pemberton-Billing Limited, which later became the Supermarine Aviation Works. One P.B.9 was built.

== Design and development ==
The wings of the Pemberton-Billing P.B.9 had full span spars with the upper and lower wings connected by four pairs of interplane struts. The fuselage had a fixed landing gear with a tail skid. While designed to allow the use of a Gnome 80 hp engine the prototype P.B.9 was powered by a 50 hp (36 kW) Gnome rotary engine taken from the company's prototype machine, the Pemberton-Billing P.B.1.

Using a set of wings that had been obtained from Radley-England (James Radley and Gordon England), the P.B.9 was designed, built and made its first flight within 9 days. For publicity reasons its designer Noel Pemberton Billing claimed it had taken a week, a claim which gave rise to the nickname "Seven Day Bus". It was first flown in August 1914.

Although the aircraft performed well, only the prototype was built. It was later used by the Royal Naval Air Service as a trainer.

== Operators ==
United Kingdom

- Royal Naval Air Service

== Specifications ==
Data from Thetford 1958

General characteristics

- Crew: 1
- Length: 20 ft 0 in (6.1 m)
- Wingspan: 26 ft 0 in (7.93 m)
- Powerplant: 1 × Gnome rotary engine , 50 hp (37 kW)

Performance

- Maximum speed: 78 mph (126 km/h, 68 kn)
- Endurance: 3 hours
- Rate of climb: 500 ft/min (2.5 m/s)

== See also ==
- List of aircraft of the Royal Naval Air Service

== Sources ==
- Mason, Francis K. (1992). The British Fighter since 1912. Putnam Aviation. Annapolis, Maryland: Naval Institute Press. ISBN 978-1-55750-082-3.
- Pegram, Ralph (2016). Beyond the Spitfire: The Unseen Designs of R.J. Mitchell. Cheltenham, UK: The History Press. ISBN 978-0-7509-6515-6.
- Thetford, Owen (1958). British Naval Aircraft 1912-58. London: Putnam Publishing.
