= Charles Vaughan-Lee =

Royal Navy Rear-Admiral (1867–1928)

Rear-Admiral Sir Charles Vaughan-Lee KBE CB
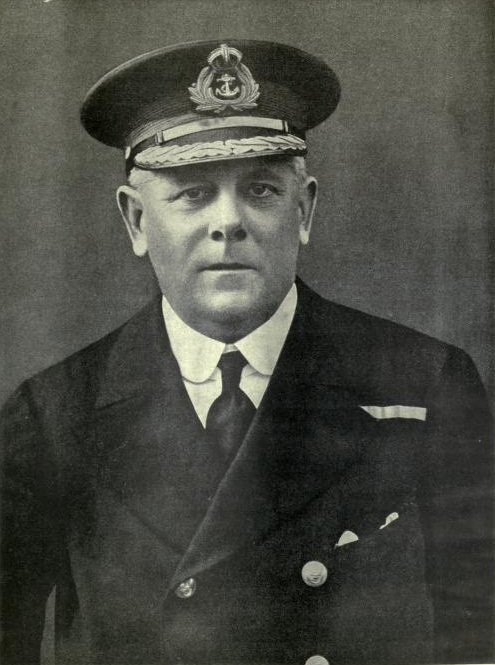
- Born: 27 February 1867; Measham, Leicestershire, England
- Died: 16 March 1928 (aged 61); Bepton, Sussex, England
- Military career
- Allegiance: United Kingdom
- Branch: Royal Navy
- Service years: 1880–1920
- Rank: Rear-Admiral
- Commands: RNTE Shotley; HMS Bellerophon; HMS Thunderer
- Conflicts: Anglo-Egyptian War (1882); World War I
- Awards: KBE; CB

Rear-Admiral Sir Charles Lionel Vaughan-Lee KBE CB (27 February 1867 – 16 March 1928) was a senior Royal Navy officer in the early 20th century. He served during World War I, rising to the rank of rear-admiral.

== Biography ==
Vaughan-Lee was born in the English village of Measham in 1867. By 1881 he was a naval cadet on HMS Dapper, the Royal Navy's officer cadet training ship. In September 1882, Vaughan-Lee was appointed as a midshipman on HMS Constance.

Vaughan-Lee was promoted to captain on 30 June 1904. In June 1906, he was captain of HMS Astraea as part of the Eastern Fleet, China Station Cruiser Squadron.

From 1909 to 1911, he served as the captain of HMS Ganges which was also then known as Royal Naval Training Establishment Shotley.

On 12 August 1915, Vaughan-Lee was promoted to rear-admiral and on 8 September he was selected to be the Director of the Admiralty's Air Department. He continued in this role until the start of 1917 when he was posted to be the Superintendent of Portsmouth Dockyard.

In 1917, he was awarded the Japanese Order of the Rising Sun, Gold and Silver Star, which represents the second highest of eight classes associated with the award. Notice of the King's permission to accept and to display this honour was duly published in the London Gazette.

He died on 16 March 1928.

Military offices
Preceded by M F Sueter	Director of the Admiralty Air Department; 1915 – 1917	Succeeded by G M Paine; As Fifth Sea Lord and Director of Naval Aviation
