= Supermarine Sea Urchin =

1920s British racing aircraft design project

Sea Urchin

General information
- Type: Racing flying-boat
- Manufacturer: Supermarine Aviation Works
- Status: unbuilt

The Supermarine Sea Urchin was an unbuilt British racing biplane flying boat designed by the Supermarine Aviation Works to compete in the 1924 Schneider Trophy. It was to be a single seat biplane, powered by a Rolls-Royce Condor V-12 water-cooled engine buried in the fuselage, driving a pusher propeller mounted on the upper wing via geared shafts. It was abandoned without being built owing to problems with the engine and the transmission required to drive the propeller.

== Specifications (Sea Urchin – estimated) ==
Data from Supermarine Aircraft Since 1914

General characteristics

- Crew: 1
- Powerplant: 1 × Rolls-Royce Condor V-12 water-cooled piston engine, 600 hp (450 kW) driving the propeller through bevel gearboxes and a transmission shaft
- Propellers: 4-bladed fixed-pitch pusher propeller

== See also ==
- List of flying boats and floatplanes

== Sources ==
- Andrews, Charles Ferdinand; Morgan, Eric B. (1981). Supermarine Aircraft since 1914. London: Putnam. ISBN 978-03701-0-018-0.
