= Supermarine "Giant" =

1930s British abandoned flying boat project

Type 179

General information
- Type: Transport flying boat
- National origin: United Kingdom
- Manufacturer: Supermarine
- Status: Cancelled

The Supermarine Type 179 "Giant" was a British monoplane flying boat developed by Supermarine but cancelled before completion.

== Design and development ==
The Type 179 was an all-metal monoplane flying-boat powered by six Rolls-Royce Buzzard piston engines mounted above the wing. It was to have a crew of seven and room for 40 passengers in a day configuration. The keel was laid down in 1931 and the aircraft was under construction when the project was abandoned in 1932. The aircraft had been registered G-ABLE in April 1931.

== Specifications (Type 179 estimated at July 1931) ==
Data from British Civil Aircraft since 1919 - Volume III, Supermarine Aircraft Since 1914

General characteristics

- Crew: 7
- Capacity: 40 passengers (day)
- Length: 104 ft 6 in (31.85 m)
- Wingspan: 185 ft (56 m)
- Height: 32 ft (9.8 m)
- Wing area: 4,720 sq ft (439 m^{2})
- Empty weight: 49,390 lb (22,403 kg)
- Gross weight: 75,090 lb (34,060 kg)
- Fuel capacity: 2,175 imp gal (2,612 US gal; 9,888 L) fuel; 105 imp gal (126 US gal; 477 L) oil
- Powerplant: 6 × Rolls-Royce H V-12 water-cooled piston engines, 850–900 hp (630–670 kW) each

(later 6x 1,030 hp (768 kW) Rolls-Royce Buzzard MS)

- Propellers: 4-bladed fixed-pitch propellers

Performance

- Maximum speed: 145 mph (233 km/h, 126 kn) at sea level
- Alighting speed: 72.5 mph (63 kn; 117 km/h)
- Cruise speed: 108.5 mph (174.6 km/h, 94.3 kn)
- Range: 700 mi (1,100 km, 610 nmi) normal

1,300 mi (1,130 nmi; 2,092 km) at cruise speed

- Endurance: 12 hours
- Service ceiling: 11,000 ft (3,400 m)
- Rate of climb: 750 ft/min (3.8 m/s) at sea level

== See also ==
Related lists

- Seaplanes and flying boats
