= Pemberton-Billing P.B.25 =

1910s British scout aircraft

P.B.25

General information
- Type: Single-seat Scout
- Manufacturer: Pemberton-Billing Limited
- Primary user: Royal Naval Air Service
- Number built: 20

History
- First flight: September 1915

The Pemberton-Billing P.B.25 was a First World War British single-seat scout aircraft built by Pemberton-Billing Limited, later Supermarine Aviation Works Limited.

== Design and development ==
The P.B.23 was designed in 1915 as a single-seat biplane scout, with a fuselage nacelle strut-mounted between the wings. The nacelle had an open cockpit for the pilot at the front and at the rear an 80 hp (60 kW) Le Rhône 9C engine driving a pusher propeller. Twin fins and rudders were mounted on a wide-span tailplane with an elevator attached, all connected to the wing structure with four tailbooms. The P.B.23 failed to gain an order after it first flew in September 1915, but twenty of an improved version, the P.B.25, were ordered by the Royal Naval Air Service. The P.B.25 had swept-back wings, a modified landing gear and a revised fuselage nacelle and although originally powered by a 110 hp (82 kW) Clerget rotary engine, the 20 RNAS aircraft were fitted with Gnome Monosoupape 9 Type B-2 rotary piston engines.

== Operational history ==
The aircraft, which were not used operationally, were based at RNAS Hornchurch and RNAS Hendon, where they were probably used in the training role.

== Operators ==
United Kingdom

- Royal Naval Air Service

== Specifications (P.B.25) ==
Data from The British Fighter since 1912

General characteristics

- Crew: 1
- Length: 24 ft 1 in (7.34 m)
- Wingspan: 33 ft 0 in (10.06 m)
- Height: 10 ft 5 in (3.18 m)
- Wing area: 277 sq ft (25.7 m^{2})
- Empty weight: 1,080 lb (490 kg)
- Gross weight: 1,576 lb (715 kg)
- Powerplant: 1 × Gnome Monosoupape 9 Type B-2 9-cylinder air-cooled rotary piston engine, 100 hp (75 kW)
- Propellers: 4-bladed fixed-pitch pusher propeller

Performance

- Maximum speed: 99 mph (159 km/h, 86 kn) at sea level
- Range: 200 mi (320 km, 170 nmi) (approx.)
- Time to altitude: 6,000 ft (1,829 m) in 8 minutes 30 seconds

Armament

- Guns: 1× Forward Firing 0.303 in (7.70 mm) Lewis machine gun

== See also ==
Related lists

- List of aircraft of the Royal Naval Air Service
