= Supermarine Spitfire (Griffon-powered variants) =

Griffon-powered variants of the Supermarine Spitfire

Spitfire
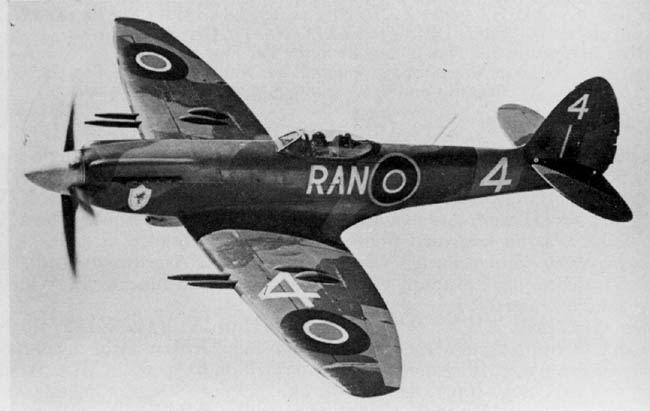
- Spitfire F Mk 22 of 607 (County of Durham) Sqn, Royal Auxiliary Air Force.

General information
- Type: Fighter/ Fighter reconnaissance/ Photo reconnaissance.
- Manufacturer: Supermarine
- Designer: Joseph Smith
- Primary user: Royal Air Force

History
- Manufactured: 1942–1948
- Introduction date: October 1942 (Mk XII)
- First flight: 27 November 1941 (Mk IV)
- Retired: 1955, RAF
- Developed from: Supermarine Spitfire
- Variants: Supermarine Seafire; Supermarine Spiteful; Supermarine Seafang

The Rolls-Royce Griffon engine was designed in answer to Royal Navy specifications for an engine capable of generating good power at low altitudes. Concepts for adapting the Spitfire to take the new engine had begun as far back as October 1939; Joseph Smith felt that "The good big 'un will eventually beat the good little 'un." and Ernest Hives of Rolls-Royce thought that the Griffon would be "a second power string for the Spitfire". The first of the Griffon-engined Spitfires flew on 27 November 1941.

Although the Griffon-engined Spitfires were never produced in the large numbers of the Merlin-engined variants they were an important part of the Spitfire family, and in their later versions kept the Spitfire at the forefront of piston-engined fighter development. This article describes the Griffon-powered Spitfire variants.

== Wing types ==
The majority of Spitfires from the Mk VIII used C, D and E wing types. Unless otherwise noted, all Griffon-engined Spitfire variants used the strengthened Dunlop AH10019 "four spoke" pattern mainwheels. With the increasing use of hard-surfaced runways in the post-war years, many Spitfires were either manufactured or re-fitted with larger mainwheels which were of a "three spoke" pattern. These were used on modified undercarriage legs which had reduced "toe-in" for the axles, which reduced tyre scrub.

=== C type ===
Also known as the "Universal wing", the new design was standard on the majority of Spitfires built from mid-1942. This wing was structurally modified to reduce labour and manufacturing time, and was designed to allow mixed armament options: A type, B type, or four 20 mm Hispano cannon.

The undercarriage mountings were redesigned and the undercarriage doors were bowed in cross section allowing the legs to sit lower in the wells, eliminating the upper-wing blisters over the wheel wells and landing gear pivot points. Stronger undercarriage legs were raked 2 inches (5.08 cm) forward, making the Spitfire more stable on the ground and reducing the likelihood of the aircraft tipping onto its nose. During production of the Mk VIII and Mk IX, a new undercarriage leg was introduced which had external v-shaped "scissor-links" fitted to the front of the leg; this also led to small changes in the shape of the undercarriage bay and leg fairings. Several versions of the Spitfire, including Mk XIV and Mk XVIII had extra 13 gallon integral fuel tanks in the wing leading edges, between the wing-root and the inboard cannon bay.

The Hispano Mk.II cannons were now belt fed from box magazines allowing for 120 rpg (the Châtellerault system). The fairings over the Hispano barrels were shorter and there was usually a short rubber stub covering the outer cannon port. Redesigned upper wing gun bay doors incorporated "teardrop" shaped blisters to clear the cannon feed motors, and the lower wings no longer had the gun bay heating vents outboard of the gunbays. To provide room for the belt feed system of the cannon, the inner machine gun bays were moved outboard between ribs 13 and 14. As the Spitfire was no longer to be used as a night fighter, the retractable landing lights were no longer fitted.

=== D Type ===
These were specifically made for the Photo-Reconnaissance Spitfires, including the PR XIX; no armament was fitted and the D-shaped leading edges of the wings ahead of the main spar, were converted into integral fuel tanks, each carrying 66 gallons. To avoid the expansion of fuel in hot weather damaging the wing, pressure relief valves, incorporating small external vent pipes, were fitted near the wing tips.

=== E type ===
Structurally unchanged from the C wing, the outer machine gun ports were eliminated, although the outer machine gun bays were retained and their access doors were devoid of empty cartridge case ports and cartridge case deflectors. The inner gun bays allowed for two weapon fits:

- 2 × 20 mm Hispano Mk II cannon with 120 rounds-per-gun (rpg) in the outer bays combined with 2 × 0.5-inch (12.7 mm) Browning M2 machine guns, with 250 rpg in the inner bays. With the relocation of the Hispano to the outer gun bay the blisters covering the feed motors were moved outboard on the gun bay doors.

or

- 4 × 20 mm Hispano cannon with 120 rpg (this configuration was rarely fitted.)

The 20 mm Hispano cannon were moved outboard and a more effective .50-inch Browning .50 cal M2/AN heavy machine gun with 250 rpg was added to the inner gun-bay replacing the outer Browning .303s. The first trial installation of the installation (modification 1029) was made in BS118, a Mark XI in November 1943. This armament later became standard for all Spitfire Mk XIVs used by RAF 2nd Tactical Air Force as fighters. The improved armament was more effective for both air-to-air engagements and air-to-ground attacks.

The Mk XII flew operationally with their rounded wingtips replaced by shorter, squared off fairings; the single-stage supercharger of the Griffon II or IV used in the Mk XIIs meant that it was rated and used as a low altitude fighter and the LF prefix used by Merlin-powered Spitfires was never applied. Starting in early 1945 most Spitfire Mk XIVs also used clipped wing tips, mainly to reduce wrinkling of the wing's skin; again the LF prefix was not applied to these aircraft.

=== Redesigned late wing ===
As the Spitfire gained more power and was able to fly at greater speeds the risk of aileron reversal was increasing so the Supermarine design team set about redesigning the wings to counter this possibility. The original wing design had a theoretical aileron-reversal speed of 580 mph (930 km/h), which was somewhat lower than that of some contemporary fighters. The new wing of the Spitfire F Mk 21 and its successors was designed to help alleviate this problem; the wing's stiffness was increased by 47 percent and a new design of aileron using piano hinges and geared trim tabs meant the theoretical aileron-reversal speed was increased to 825 mph (1,328 km/h). This wing entered service on the Spitfire XXI. The standard armament was now four 20mm Hispano IIs or the shorter, lighter Hispano V cannons, each with 150 rounds per gun.

== Variants ==
The Mark numbers used in the aircraft designations did not necessarily indicate a chronological order; for example, the Mk IX was a stopgap measure brought into production before the Mks VII and VIII. Some Spitfires of one mark or variant may have been modified to another; for example, several of the first Mk Vbs were converted from Mk Ibs; the first Mk IXs were originally Mk Vcs.

Up until the end of 1942, the RAF always used Roman numerals for mark numbers. From 1943–1948, new aircraft entering service were given Arabic numerals for mark numbers but older aircraft retained their Roman numerals. From 1948, Arabic numerals were used exclusively. Thus, the Spitfire PR Mk XIX became the PR 19 after 1948. This article adopts the convention of using Roman numerals for the Mks I–XX and Arabic numerals for the Mks 21–24. Type numbers (such as "Type 361") are the drawing board design numbers allocated by Supermarine.

=== Mk IV / XX (type 337) ===
On 4 December 1939, the Supermarine design staff produced a brochure which mooted the idea of converting the Spitfire to use the Rolls-Royce Griffon engine. A top speed of 423 mph (681 km/h) at 18,500 ft (5,639 m) was predicted. However, constant problems with the development of the Griffon meant that the decision to proceed with building a Spitfire with this engine didn't come to fruition until 1942, with the successful flight trials of the Mk IV.

The Griffon IIB which powered the Mk IV was a single-stage supercharged engine of 1,735 hp (1,293 kW). Stronger main longerons were needed to cope with the weight of the Griffon and it required a bigger radiator and oil cooler, although it kept the asymmetric under-wing radiator layout of the single stage Merlin marks. The new engine had a lower thrust-line than the Merlin and was set with 2 degrees of downthrust. The lower thrust line and larger capacity of the new engine meant that the contours of the engine cowling were completely changed, with more prominent blisters over the cylinder heads, plus a third tear-drop shaped blister on the upper forward cowling to clear the magneto, and a deeper curve down to the spinner, which was much longer than previous types. The lower cowling lost its "pigeon-chested" appearance, with a shallower curve up to the spinner. A four blade Rotol propeller of 10 ft 5 in (3.1 m) was used. Apart from these differences the Mk IV airframe was closely related to that of the Merlin-powered Mk III. One feature of the Griffon engine which was to catch a lot of pilots out was that the propeller rotated in the opposite direction to that of the Merlin; i.e.,: to the left, from the pilot's perspective, rather than to the right. This meant that the powerful slipstream swung the Spitfire to the right on the ground, requiring the rudder to be deflected to the left during takeoff.

The Mark IV DP845 first flew on 27 November 1941. It had the full-span C wing combined with a small tail unit and retractable tailwheel, and also had external bracket hinges under the wings, denoting the installation of braking flaps. These were soon removed and a mock-up of a proposed six-cannon armament was fitted, three in each wing. The aircraft was soon renamed Mk XX, to avoid confusion with a renamed PR type, then it became the Mk XII.

Jeffrey Quill, Supermarine's chief test pilot, was the first to fly the Mk IV/Mk XII prototype DP845,

... there was somewhat less ground clearance, resulting in a slight reduction in propeller diameter; the power available for take-off was much greater; and the engine RPM were lower than in the Merlin. All this meant that the throttle needed to be handled judiciously on take-off but, once in the air, the aeroplane had a great feeling of power about it; it seemed to be the airborne equivalent of a very powerful sports car and was great fun to fly. Changes of trim with changes of power were much more in evidence, both directionally and longitudinally, and the aeroplane sheared about a bit during tight manoeuvres and simulated dog-fights. I realised at once that we should have to correct its directional characteristics and probably its longitudinal stability also, both of which in due time we achieved. Indeed, DP845 eventually went through many phases of development throughout and I, and others, flew in it a great deal; it became one of our favourite aeroplanes.

— Quill

=== Mk XII (type 366) ===
Media related to Supermarine Spitfire Mark XII at Wikimedia Commons

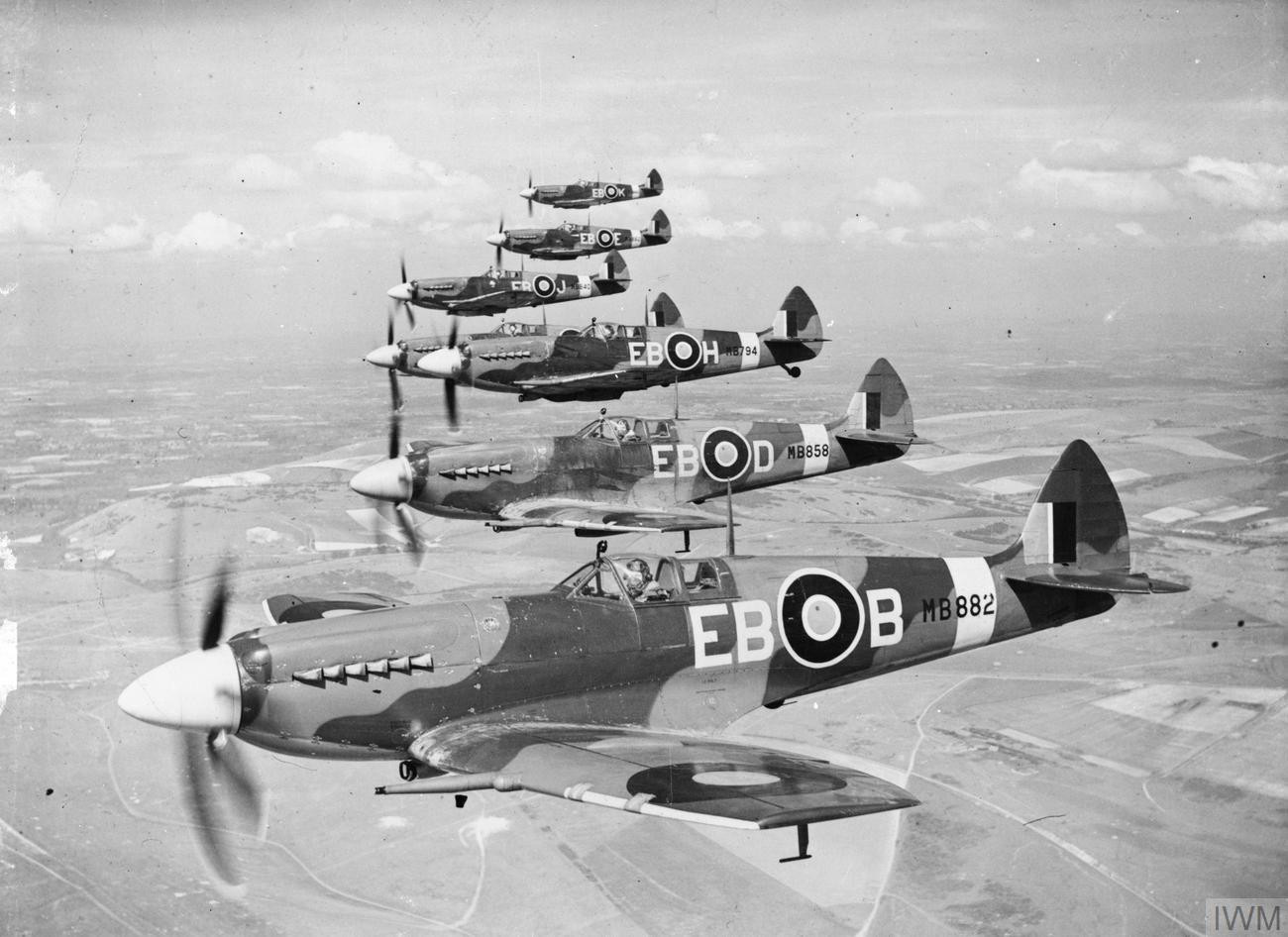
Spitfire Mk XIIs of 41 Sqn. The final production Mk XII was MB882, "EB-B" (foreground), flown by Flt. Lt. Donald Smith, RAAF. The fixed tailwheel of "EB-H" (third from front) suggests that the airframe was originally a Mk Vc.

The Mk XII was the first Spitfire powered by a Griffon engine to go into service. The first of 100 Supermarine-built production aircraft started appearing in October 1942; two RAF squadrons in total were equipped with the XII. Mk XIIs were manufactured from Mk Vc and Mk VIII airframes: early production aircraft had the fixed tail wheels, Dunlop AH2061 pattern "five spoke" mainwheels and small elevator balances. They had a single 85 gal main fuel tank, giving a short range of little over 380 miles (610 km) on internal fuel. All were fitted with the larger, pointed tip rudder. The last 45 or so Mk XIIs, were based on Mk VIIIs with two wing fuel tanks, each containing a maximum fuel load of 14 gal, and featured the larger horn balances, retractable tailwheel and undercarriage legs with torque-links, "dished" leg fairings and the stronger Dunlop AH10019 four spoke wheels. The wheels were occasionally fitted with disc-style covers. A later model IFF was fitted, replacing the aerials from the tailplane tip to fuselage with a rod aerial under the starboard wing. Another important feature of the Griffon-engine Spitfires was the entirely flush-riveted finish which was progressively introduced on all Spitfires.

The single-stage Griffon engine (II or IV) gave the aircraft superb low and medium level performance, although the Mk XII's performance declined at higher altitudes: because of this all production aircraft had "clipped" wings. In comparative tests with a Mk IX it was 14 mph (23 km/h) faster at sea level, but above 20,000 ft (6,100 m) it had become slower. Handling, however, was considered to be better than previous Spitfire marks, and the clipped wings conferred excellent manoeuvrability through enhanced aileron response.

At low altitude it was one of the fastest aircraft in the world; in one speed trial, held at Farnborough in July 1942 DP485 (now referred to as the Mk XII) piloted by Jeffrey Quill raced ahead of a Hawker Typhoon and a captured Focke-Wulf Fw 190, contrary to expectations.

On reflection the general scheme became clear. The Spitfire was to be a sort of datum pacemaker – 'Mr Average Contemporary Fighter' – and its job would be to come in last, the real excitement of the proceedings being by how much it would be beaten by the Fw 190 and the Typhoon, and which of these two bright stars would beat the other and by how much. Outside on the tarmac at Worthy Down stood the inoffensive-looking but highly potent DP485 ... All went according to plan until, when we were about halfway between Odiham and Farnborough and going flat out, I was beginning to overhaul the Fw 190 and the Typhoon. Suddenly I saw sparks and black smoke coming from the Fw 190's exhaust ... and I shot past him and never saw him again. I was also easily leaving the Typhoon behind and the eventual finishing order was, first the Spitfire, second the Typhoon, third the Fw 190. This was precisely the opposite result to that expected, or indeed intended. It certainly put the cat among the pigeons and among the VIPs.

Another photo of MB882 showing the disc covers on the mainwheels.

However pilots found it difficult to exploit this advantage in combat as German pilots were reluctant to be drawn into dogfights with Spitfires of any type below 20,000 feet (6,100 m). When the Mk XII was able to engage in combat it was a formidable fighter and several Fw 190s and Messerschmitt Bf 109Gs fell victim to it. The Mk XII's speed advantage at lower altitudes again became useful near the end of its front line service in summer 1944, when its pilots were credited with 82.5 V-1 Flying Bomb kills. The Mk XII variant was retired in September 1944.

=== Mk XIV (type 379) ===
Media related to Supermarine Spitfire Mark XIV at Wikimedia Commons

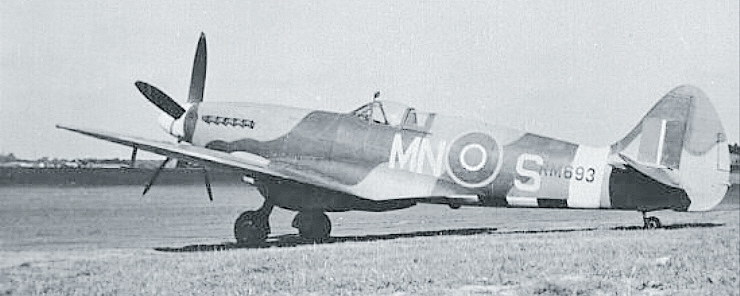
Spitfire XIV of 350 (Belgian) Squadron of the Spitfire XIV wing based at Lympne, Kent 1944. This aircraft is carrying a 30 gal "slipper" drop tank under the centre-section.

The first Griffon-powered Spitfires suffered from poor high altitude performance due to having only a single stage supercharged engine. By 1943, Rolls-Royce engineers had developed a new Griffon engine, the 61 series, with a two-stage supercharger. In the end it was a slightly modified engine, the 65 series, which was used in the Mk XIV. The resulting aircraft provided a substantial performance increase over the Mk IX. Although initially based on the Mk VIII airframe, common improvements made in aircraft produced later included the cut-back fuselage and tear-drop canopies, and the E-Type wing with improved armament.

The Mk XIV differed from the Mk XII in that the longer, two-stage supercharged Griffon 65, producing 2,050 hp (1,528 kW), was mounted 10 inches (25.4 cm) further forward. The top section of the engine bulkhead was angled forward, creating a distinctive change of angle to the upper cowling's rear edge. A new five bladed Rotol propeller of 10 ft 5 in (3.18 m) in diameter was used, although one prototype JF321 was fitted with a six bladed contra rotating unit. The "fishtail" design of ejector exhaust stub gave way to ones of circular section. The increased cooling requirements of the Griffon engine meant that all radiators were much bigger and the underwing housings were deeper than previous versions.

The cowling fasteners were new, flush fitting "Amal" type and there were more of them. The oil tank (which had been moved from the lower cowling location of the Merlin engine variants to forward of the fuselage fuel tanks) was increased in capacity from 6 to 10 gal.

To help balance the new engine, the radio equipment was moved further back in the rear fuselage and the access hatch was moved from the left fuselage side to the right. Better VHF radio equipment allowed for the aerial mast to be removed and replaced by a "whip" aerial further aft on the fuselage spine. Because of the longer nose and the increased slipstream of the big five-bladed propeller, a new tail unit with a taller, broader fin and a rudder of increased area was adopted.

The first batch of aircraft to fly with the Griffon 60 series engines were six converted Mk VIIIs JF316 to JF321 which were called Mk VIIIG. The first one of these was flown by Jeffrey Quill on 20 January 1943,

Changes to the aircraft were restricted to those essential to enable it to accept the new engine ... I found that it had a spectacular performance doing 445 mph at 25,000 ft, with a sea-level rate of climb of over 5,000 ft per minute. I remember being greatly delighted with it; it seemed to me that from this relatively simple conversion, carried out with a minimum of fuss and bother, had come up with something quite outstanding ... The MK VIIIG, with virtually the same tail surfaces both vertical and horizontal as the Merlin MK VIII, was very much over-powered and the handling in the air was unacceptable for an operational type ... I soon realised that a new throttle box would be needed giving a much greater angular travel for the hand lever ... The next essential ... was an improvement in the directional stability and control and a new fin was drawn out with a substantial increase in area (7.42 sq. ft) and a much larger rudder and fitted to the second aircraft JF317. This, though not ideal, produced a very marked improvement in directional characteristics and we were able to introduce minor changes thereafter and by various degrees of trimmer tab and balance tab to reach an acceptable degree of directional stability and control. The enlarged fin of JF317 had a straight leading edge but for production a more elegant curved line was introduced.

— Quill

One prototype, JF321, was fitted and tested with a Rotol six-bladed contra-rotating propeller unit; although this promised to eliminate the characteristic swing on take-off (caused by the propeller slipstream) the propeller unit was prone to failure. The pitch control mechanism controlled the pitch on the front propeller,

... and this was transmitted to the rear propeller (which was rotating in the opposite direction) through the transitional bearing mechanism. If this failed the pitch of the rear propeller was no longer under control and might do anything which was potentially dangerous.

— Quill

A similar contra-rotating propeller unit was later used on production Seafire 46 and 47s.

When the new fighter entered service with 610 Squadron in December 1943 it was a leap forward in the evolution of the Spitfire. Jeffrey Quill flew the first production aircraft, RB140 in October 1943:

So the Mk XIV was in business, and a very fine fighter it was. It fully justified the faith of those who, from the early days in 1939, had been convinced that the Griffon engine would eventually see the Spitfire into a new lease of life ... It was a splendid aeroplane in every respect. We still had some work to do to improve its longitudinal and directional characteristics, but it was powerful and performed magnificently. The only respect in which the XIV fell short was in its range.

— Quill

The Mk XIV could climb to 20,000 ft (6,100 m) in just over five minutes and its top speed, which was achieved at 25,400 ft (7,700 m), was 446 mph (718 km/h).

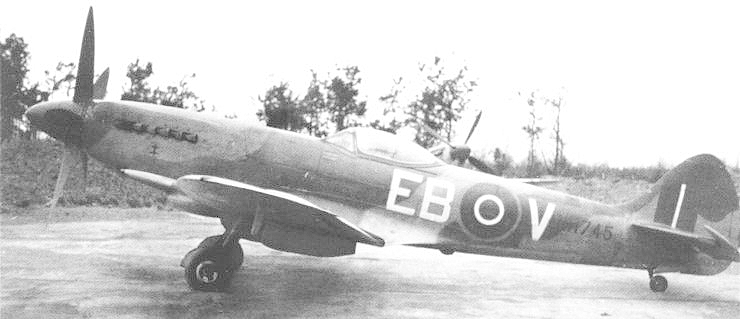
Late model F Mk XIV of 41 Squadron with the cut down rear fuselage and clear-view canopy. Germany, May 1945.

In operational service many pilots initially found that the new fighter could be difficult to handle, particularly if they were used to earlier Spitfire marks. Don Healy of 17 Squadron, based at Madura recalled that the Mk XIV was;

...a hairy beast to fly and took some getting used to. I personally preferred the old Mk Vs from a flying standpoint ... Even with full aileron, elevator and rudder, this brute of a fighter took off slightly sideways.

In spite of the difficulties pilots appreciated the performance increases. Wing Commander Peter Brothers, O/C Culmhead Wing in 1944–1945 and a Battle of Britain veteran;

It was truly an impressive machine, being able to climb almost vertically – it gave many Luftwaffe pilots the shock of their lives when, having thought they had bounced you from a superior height, they were astonished to find the Mk XIV climbing up to tackle them head-on, throttle wide open!

F Mk XIVs had a total of 109.5 gal of fuel consisting of 84 gal in two main tanks and a 12.5 imp gal fuel tank in each leading edge wing tank; other 30, 45, 50 or 90 gal drop tanks could be carried. The fighter's maximum range was just a little over 460 miles (740 km) on internal fuel, since the new Griffon engine consumed much more fuel per hour than the original Merlin engine of earlier variants. By late 1944, Spitfire XIVs were fitted with an extra 33 gal in a rear fuselage fuel tank, extending the fighter's range to about 850 miles (1,370 km) on internal fuel and a 90 gal drop tank. Mk XIVs with "tear-drop" canopies had 64 gal. As a result, F and FR Mk XIVes had a range that was increased to over 610 miles (980 km), or 960 miles (1,540 km) with a 90 gal drop tank.

The first test of the aircraft was in intercepting V1 flying bombs and the Mk XIV was the most successful of all Spitfire marks in this role. When 150 octane fuel was introduced in mid-1944 the "boost" of the Griffon engine was able to be increased to +25 lbs (80.7"), allowing the top speed to be increased by about 30 mph (26 kn; 48 km/h) to 400 mph (350 kn; 640 km/h) at 2,000 ft (610 m).

The Mk XIV was used by the 2nd Tactical Air Force as their main high-altitude air superiority fighter in northern Europe with six squadrons operational by December 1944.

One problem which did arise in service was localised skin wrinkling on the wings and fuselage at load attachment points; although Supermarine advised that the Mk XIVs had not been seriously weakened, nor were they on the point of failure, the RAF issued instructions in early 1945 that all F and FR Mk XIVs were to be refitted with clipped wings.

Spitfire XIVs began to arrive in the South-East Asian Theatre in June 1945, too late to operate against the Japanese. Several Mk XIVs were rumoured to have been buried at an airfield in Burma after the war.

=== FR Mk XIV ===
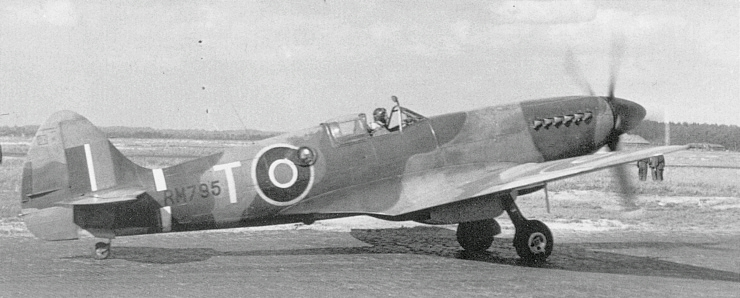
Spitfire FR Mk XIV of 430(RCAF) Squadron. This was a conversion of a standard F Mk XIV. The under-wing IFF aerial can be seen, as can the small, D-shaped beam approach aerial housing under the wing root.

Late in 1944 a number of high-back full-span Mk XIVes were converted by the Forward Repair Unit (FRU) to have a single camera fitted, facing to port or starboard; a conversion identical to that used on the FRU-converted FR Mk IXc. To achieve this a new hatch, similar to the radio hatch on the port side, was installed on the starboard side, and both hatches were fitted with camera ports in streamlined blisters. Otherwise this version of the FR Mk XIVe was essentially the same as the standard aircraft. These field-converted aircraft were allocated to 430 squadron RCAF. Later, purpose-built conversions, also known as the FR Mk XIVe, had the later cut-down rear fuselage with its tear drop–shaped canopy, port and/or starboard camera ports (without blisters), and an additional rear fuel tank of 34 gallons which extended the Spitfire's range to about 610 miles (980 km) on internal fuel. Because it was used mainly at low altitudes the "production" FR Mk XIVe had clipped wingtips.

In total, 957 Mk XIVs were built, over 430 of which were FR Mk XIVs. After the war, second hand Mk XIVs were exported to a number of foreign air forces; 132 went to the Royal Belgian Air Force, 70 went to the Royal Indian Air Force and 30 of its reconnaissance variant went to the Royal Thai Air Force.

=== Mk XV and Mk XVII ===
The mark numbers XV and XVII (15 and 17) were reserved for the naval version, the Seafire, to reconcile the Spitfire numbering scheme with that of the Seafire.

=== Mk XVIII (Mk 18) (type 394) ===
Media related to Supermarine Spitfire Mark XVIII at Wikimedia Commons

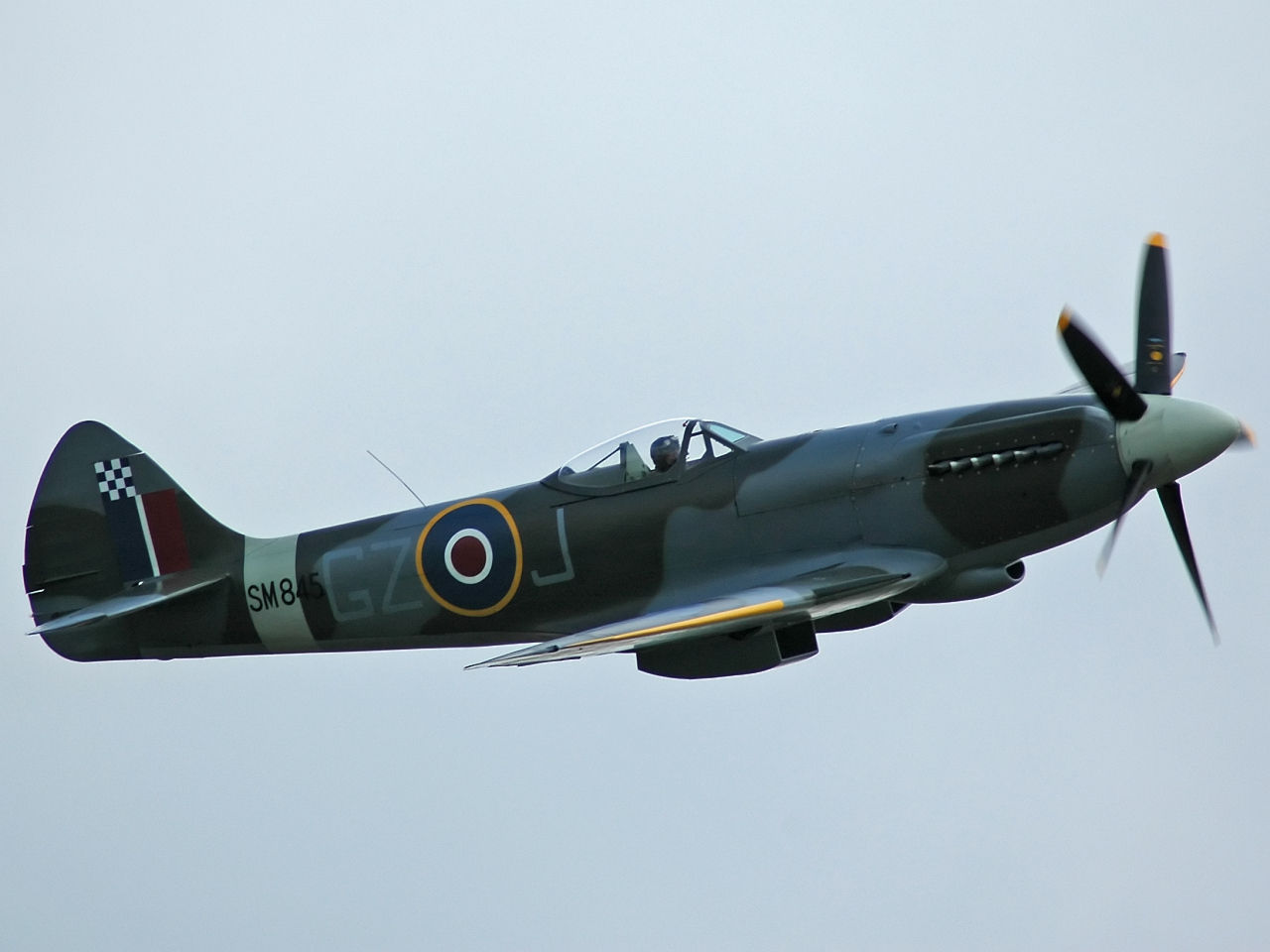
Spitfire Mk 18

The Mk 18 was a refinement of the Mk XIV. It was identical in most respects including engine (the Griffon 65) and cockpit enhancements, but it carried extra fuel and had a revised, stronger wing structure. Its handling was also nearly identical and so it was not put through any performance tests. Like the Mk XIV there were fighter and fighter reconnaissance variants built.

The Mk 18 missed the war. It was built up until early 1946 but it was not until January 1947, that an RAF squadron, 60 Squadron which operated from RAF Seletar, Singapore, was re-equipped with the variant. Later, other squadrons in the Far East and Middle East would receive them. Some 300 F Mk 18s and FR Mk 18s were built, before production ended in early 1946. The Mk 18s saw little action apart from some involvement against guerrillas in the Malayan Emergency. The Royal Indian Air Force purchased 20 ex-RAF Mk 18s in 1947.

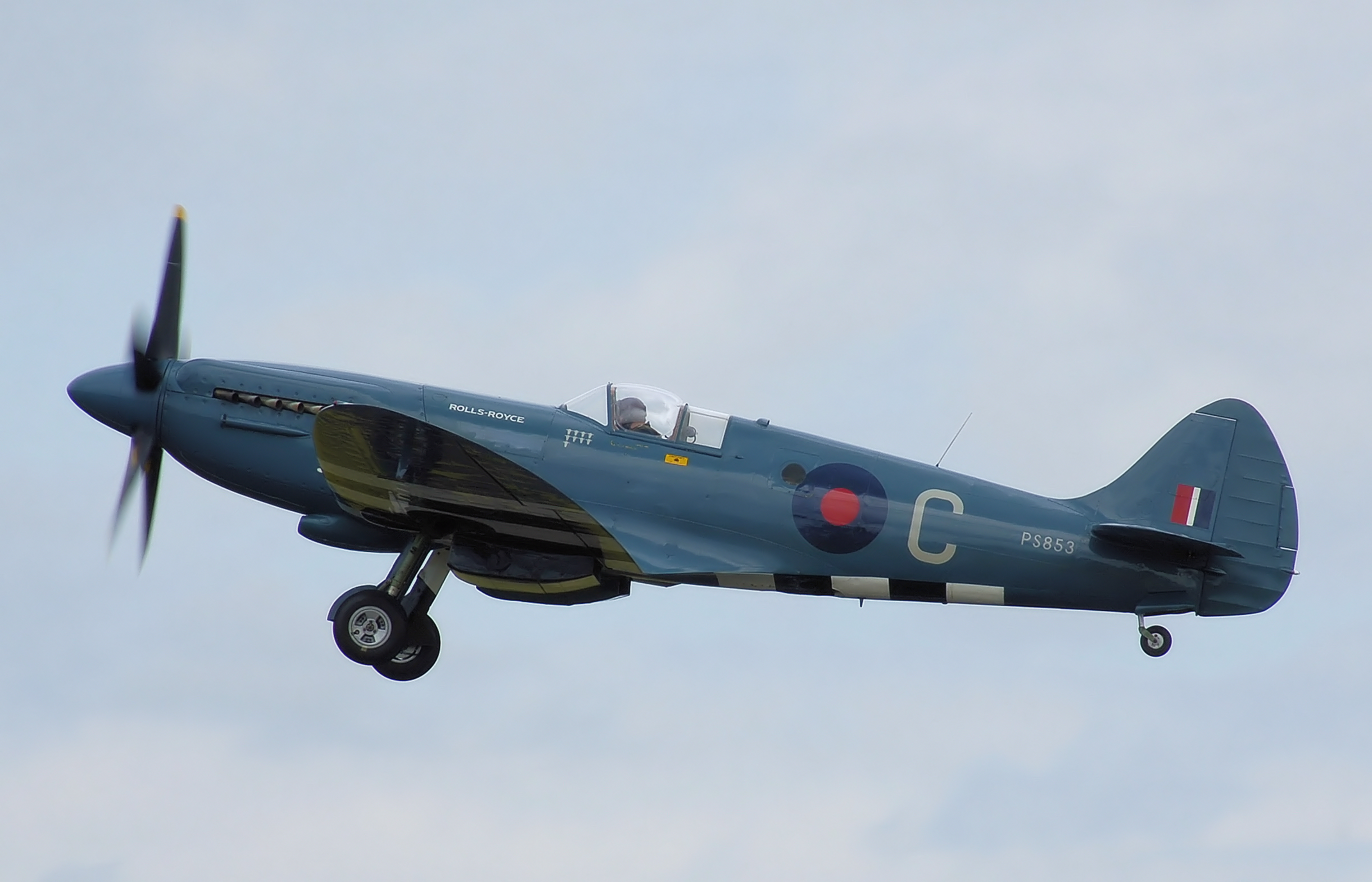
Spitfire Mk 19 PS583 takes off

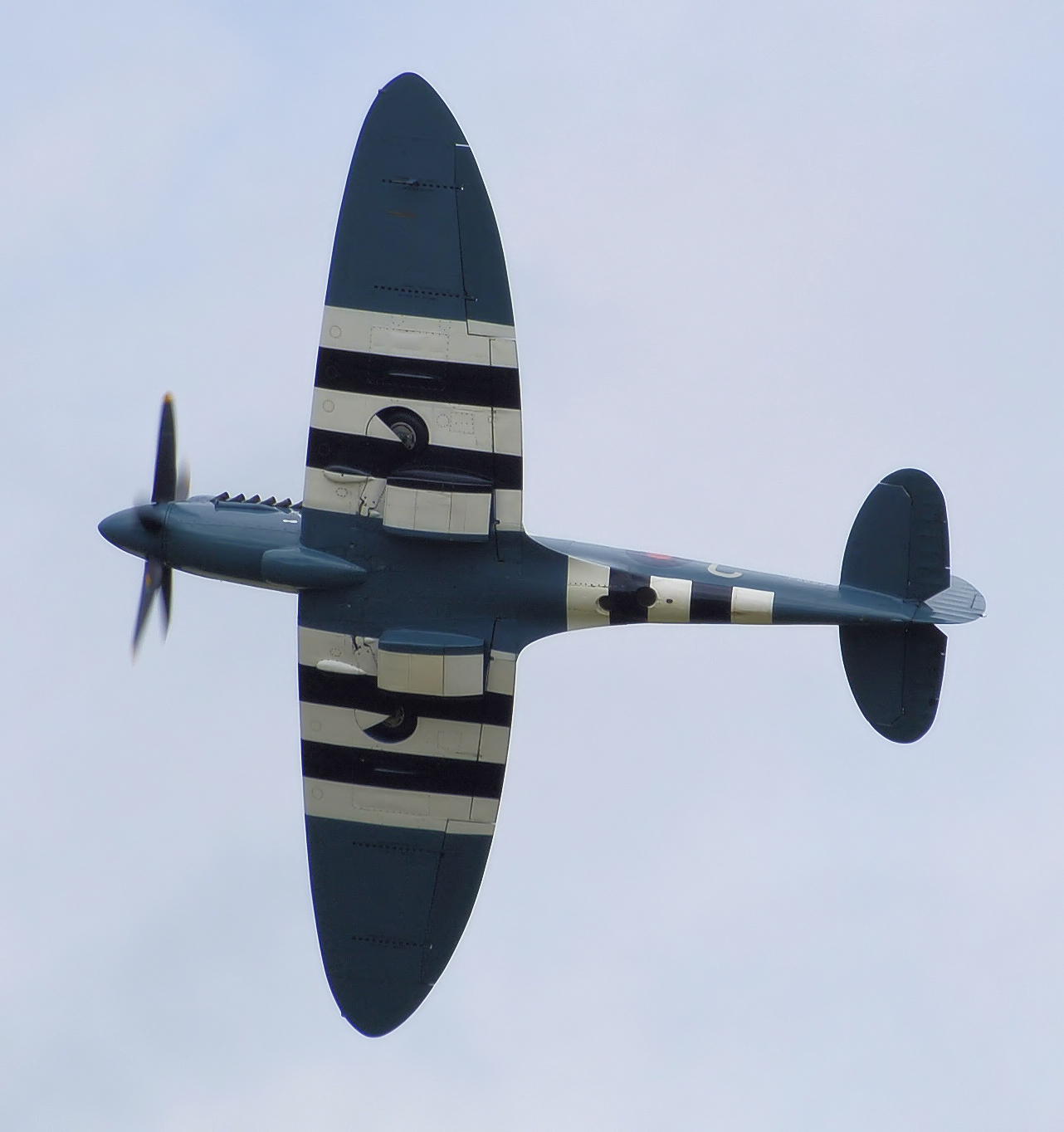
Spitfire Mk 19 (PS583) shows its elliptical wing planform

=== Mk XIX (Mk 19) (types 389 and 390) ===
Media related to Supermarine Spitfire Mark XIX at Wikimedia Commons
The Mk XIX was the last and most successful photographic reconnaissance variant of the Spitfire. It combined features of the Mk XI with the Griffon engine of the Mk XIV. After the first 25 (type 389s) were produced, later aircraft were also fitted with the pressurised cabin of the Mk X and the fuel capacity was increased to 256 gallons, three-and-a-half times that of the original Spitfire This version was the type 390.

The first Mk XIXs entered service in May 1944, and by the end of the war the type had virtually replaced the earlier Mk XI. A total of 225 were built with production ceasing in early 1946, but they were used in front line RAF service until April 1954.

In 1951, Hainan Island (People's Republic of China) was targeted at the behest of US Naval Intelligence for RAF overflights, using Spitfire PR Mk 19s based at Kai Tak Airport in Hong Kong. The last operational sortie by a Mk 19 was in 1963 when one was used in battle trials against an English Electric Lightning to determine how best a Lightning should engage piston-engined aircraft. This information was needed in case RAF Lightnings might have to engage North American P-51 Mustangs in the Indonesian conflict of the time.

=== Mk XX (type 366) ===
Mark XX was given to the original Mk IV Griffon engine prototype DP845 to avoid confusion with the retitled Spitfire PR Mk IVs.

The second Mk XX, DP851, initially had a Griffon II engine and made its first flight in August 1942. In December, it was refitted with a Griffon 61 and re-designated as a Mk 21 initial prototype.

=== Mk 21 (type 356) ===
Media related to Supermarine Spitfire Mark 21 at Wikimedia Commons
By early 1942, it was evident that Spitfires powered by the new two-stage supercharged Griffon 61 engine would need a much stronger airframe and wings. The proposed new design was called the Mk 21, which at first displayed poor flight qualities that damaged the excellent Spitfire reputation. The wings were redesigned with a new structure and thicker-gauge light alloy skinning. The new wing was torsionally 47 per cent stiffer, allowing an increased theoretical aileron reversal speed of 825 mph (1,328 km/h). The ailerons were 5 per cent larger and the Frise balanced type were dispensed with, the ailerons being attached by continuous piano-hinges. They were extended by eight inches, meaning that with a straighter trailing edge, the wings were not the same elliptical shape as previous Spitfires. The Mk 21 armament was standardised as four 20mm Hispano II cannon with 150 rounds per gun and no machine guns.

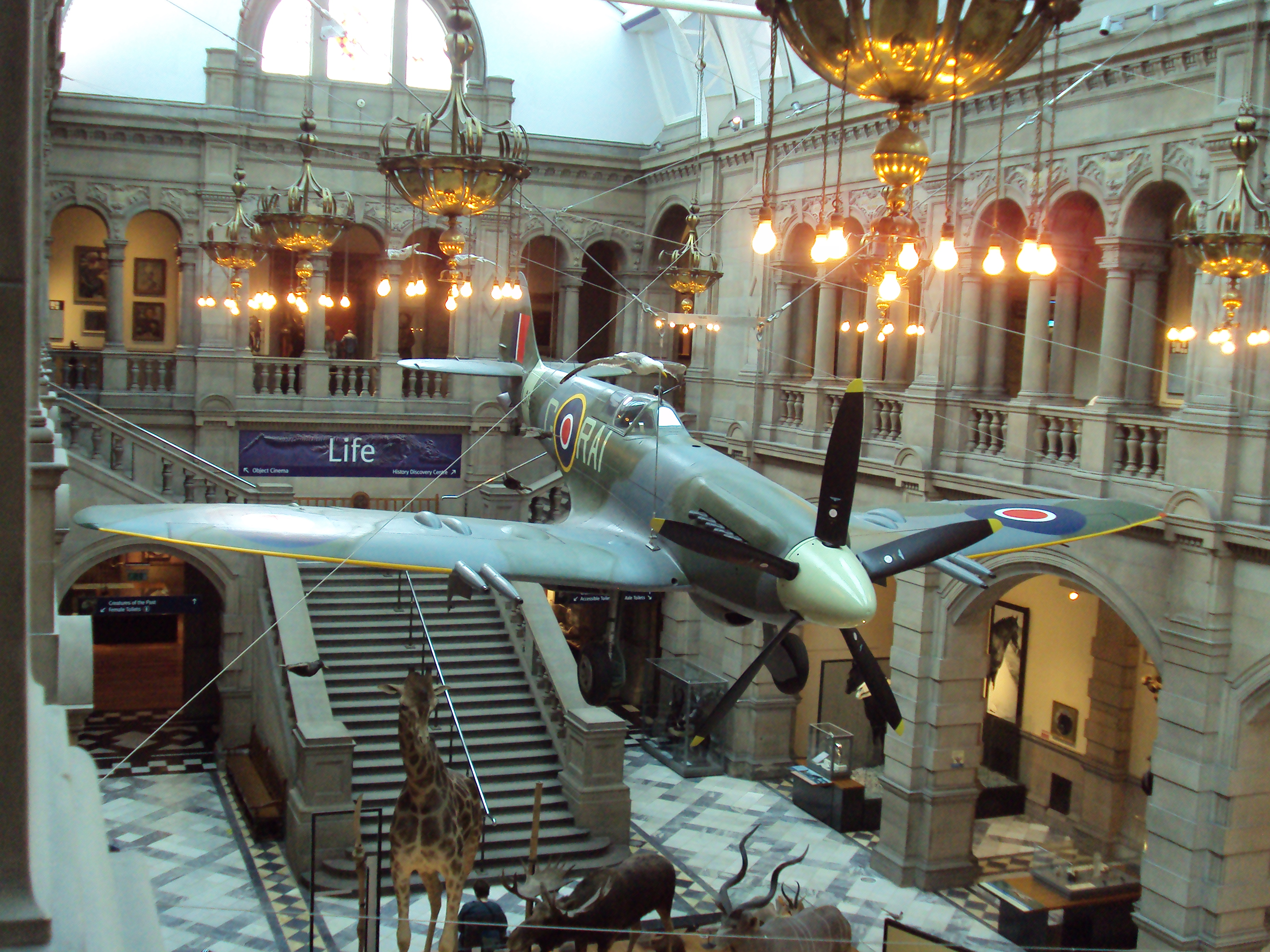
Five-bladed propeller and modified wing shape: F.21 LA198 of 1 Squadron (postwar with 602 Squadron), on display at Kelvingrove Art Gallery and Museum.

The Griffon engine drove an 11 ft (3.4 m)-diameter five-bladed propeller, some 7 in (18 cm) larger than that fitted to the Mk XIV. To ensure sufficient ground clearance for the new propeller, the undercarriage legs were lengthened by 4.5 in (11 cm). The undercarriage legs also had a 7.75 in (19.7 cm) wider track to help improve ground handling. The designers used a system of levers to shorten the undercarriage legs by about 8 in (20 cm) as they retracted, because the longer legs did not have enough space in which to retract; the levers extended the legs as they came down. The larger diameter four-spoke main wheels were strengthened to cope with the greater weights; post-war these were replaced by wider, reinforced three spoke wheels to allow Spitfires to operate from hard concrete or asphalt runways. When retracted the wheels were fully enclosed by triangular doors which were hinged to the outer edge of the wheel wells.

The first production Mk 21s used the same airframe as the Mk XIV. The first true Mk 21 prototype, PP139 first flew in July 1943, with the first production aircraft LA187 flying on 15 March 1944. The modifications over the Mk XIV made the Mk 21 sensitive to trim changes. LA201's poor flight control qualities during trials in late 1944 and early 1945, led to a damning report from the Air Fighting Development Unit

...it must be emphasised that although the Spitfire 21 is not a dangerous aircraft to fly, pilots must be warned ... in its present state it is not likely to prove a satisfactory fighter. No further attempts should be made to perpetuate the Spitfire family.

Supermarine were seriously concerned because Castle Bromwich had been converted to produce Mk 21s and more were coming off the production lines daily. Jeffrey Quill commented that,

The AFDU were quite right to criticise the handling of the Mark 21 ... Where they went terribly wrong was to recommend that all further development of the Spitfire family should cease. They were quite unqualified to make such a judgement and later events would prove them totally wrong.

After intensive test flying, the most serious problems were solved by changing the gearing to the trim tabs and other subtle control modifications, such that the Mk 21 was cleared for instrument flying and low level flight during trials in March 1945. An AFDU report on LA215 issued that month noted that the Spitfire 21 was now much easier to fly,

General Handling The modifications carried out to this aircraft have resulted in an improvement of the general handling characteristics at all heights ... Conclusions The critical trimming characteristics reported on the production Spitfire 21 have been largely eliminated by the modifications carried out to this aircraft. Its handling qualities have benefitted (sic) to a corresponding extent and it is now considered suitable both for instrument flying and low flying. It is considered that the modifications to the Spitfire 21 make it a satisfactory combat aircraft for the average pilot.

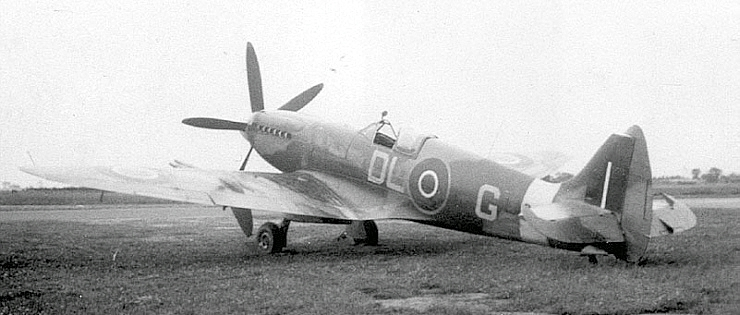
Spitfire F Mk 21 of 91 Squadron.

Spitfire 21s became operational on 91 Squadron in January 1945. The squadron had little opportunity to engage the Luftwaffe before the war ended but scored a rare success on 26 April 1945, when two Spitfire Mk 21s shot up and claimed to have sunk a German midget submarine which they caught on the surface. With the end of the war, most orders for the Mk 21 were cancelled and only 120 were completed. In 1946 forty Spitfire 21s were delivered to Shoeburyness; once there their leading edges were removed and destroyed in "lethality" tests. Some aircraft had less than five hours flying time.

=== Mk 22 (type 356) ===
Media related to Supermarine Spitfire Mark 22 at Wikimedia Commons

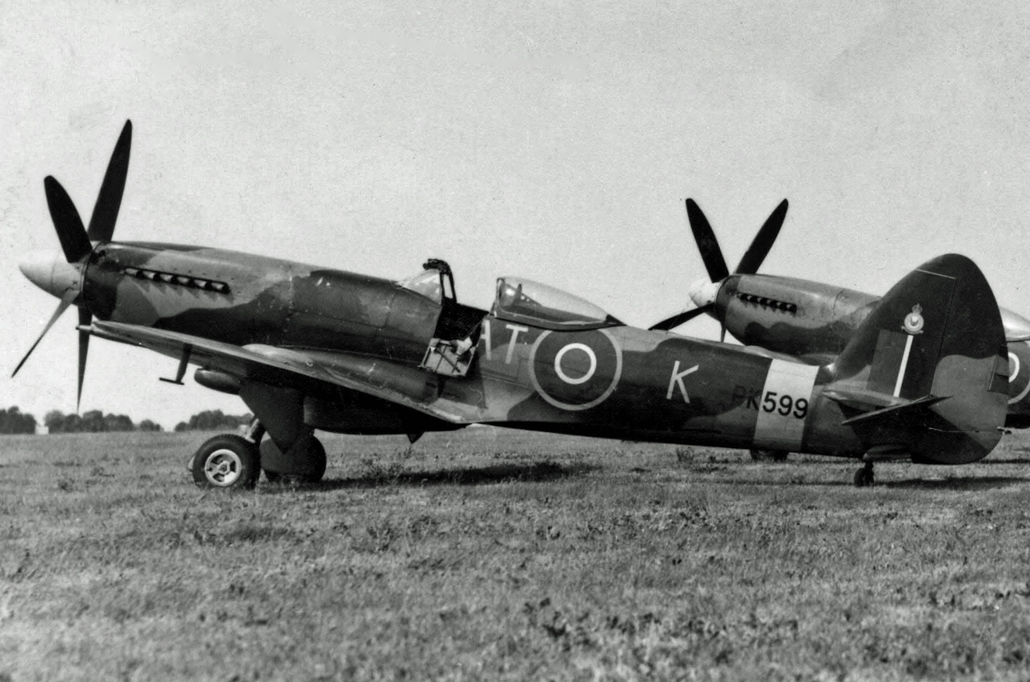
Spitfire F.22 of No. 613 (City of Manchester) Squadron in 1949

The Mk 22 was identical to the Mk 21 in all respects except for the cut-back rear fuselage, with the tear-drop canopy, and a more powerful 24 volt electrical system in place of the 12 volt system of all earlier Spitfires. Most of the Mk 22s were built with enlarged tail surfaces, similar to those of the Supermarine Spiteful. A total of 287 Mk 22s were built: 260 at Castle Bromwich and 27 by Supermarine at South Marston.

The Mk 22 was used by only one regular RAF unit, 73 Squadron based on Malta. However 12 squadrons of the Royal Auxiliary Air Force used the variant and continued to do so until March 1951. The Mk 22 was also used at Flying refresher schools. In May 1955 the remaining F.22s were declared obsolete for all RAF purposes and many were sold back to Vickers-Armstrongs for refurbishment and were then sold to the Southern Rhodesian, Egyptian and Syrian Air Forces.

=== Mk 23 (type 372) ===
The Mk 23 was to be a Mk 22 incorporating a revised wing design which featured an increase in incidence, lifting the leading edge by 2 inches (51 mm). It was hoped that this would improve the pilot's view over the nose in flight and increase the high speed and dive performance of the aircraft. The modified, hand-built wing was first fitted to a Mk VIII JG204 which was tested from July 1944. However the tests were disappointing and, after discussions at Supermarine, it was decided to build a new prototype using the Mk 21 prototype PP139: in this form the prototype was designated F Mk 23, and was to be renamed the Supermarine Valiant. However the new wing gave less than perfect handling characteristics and so the Mk 23 was never built from the Mk 22 airframe as intended.

=== Mk 24 (type 356) ===
Media related to Supermarine Spitfire Mark 24 at Wikimedia Commons

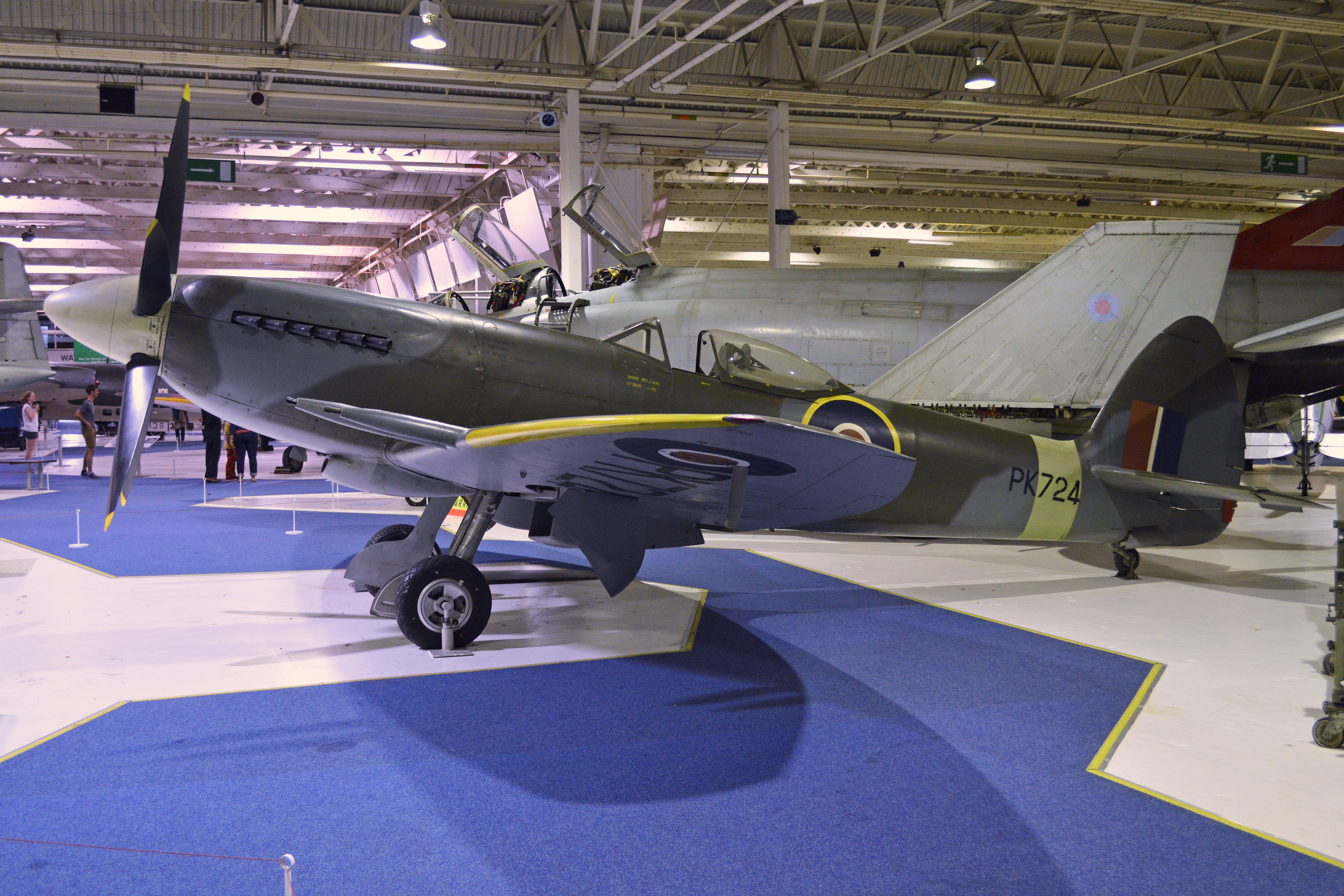
Spitfire F.24 in the RAF Museum, London

The final Spitfire variant, the Mk 24, was similar to the Mk 22 except that it had an increased fuel capacity over its predecessors, with two fuel tanks of 33 gal (150 L) each installed in the rear fuselage. There were also zero-point fittings for rocket projectiles under the wings. All had the larger "Spiteful" tail units; modifications were also made to the trim tab gearings to perfect the F Mk 24's handling. The F Mk 24 achieved a maximum speed of 454 mph (731 km/h) and could reach an altitude of 30,000 ft (9,100 m) in eight minutes, putting it on a par with the most advanced piston-engined fighters of the era.

Although designed as a fighter-interceptor aircraft, the Spitfire proved its versatility in other roles. As a fighter, the F Mk 24 armament consisted of four 20 mm Hispano cannon – operational experience had proved that the hitting power of these larger weapons was necessary to overcome the thicker armour encountered on enemy aircraft as the war progressed. The aircraft was also used as a fighter-bomber, carrying one 500 lb (230 kg) and two 250 lb (110 kg) bombs, with rocket-projectile launch rails fitted as standard. Late production aircraft were built with the lighter, short-barrelled, electrically-triggered Hispano Mark V cannon. A total of 81 Mk 24s were completed, 27 of which were conversions from Mk 22s. The last Mk 24 to be built was delivered in February 1948 and were used until 1952 by 80 Squadron. Some of the squadron's aircraft went to the Hong Kong Auxiliary Air Force where they were operated until 1955.

Introduced into service in late 1945, the F Mk 24 differed greatly from the Spitfire Mk I, was twice as heavy, nearly twice as powerful and showed an increase in climb rate of 80 per cent over that of the prototype, K5054. These remarkable increases in performance arose chiefly from the introduction of the Rolls-Royce Griffon engine in place of the famous Merlin of earlier variants. Rated at 2,050 hp (1,530 kW), the 12-cylinder Vee liquid-cooled Griffon 61 engine had a two-stage supercharger, giving the Spitfire the exceptional performance at high altitude that had been sometimes lacking in early models.

== Production ==
After the destruction of the main Itchen and Woolston works by the Luftwaffe in September 1940, all Supermarine manufactured Spitfires were built in a number of "Shadow Factories"; by the end of the war there were ten main factories and several smaller workshops which built many of the components. The main Castle Bromwich factory was also aided by a smaller number of the shadow factories. The breakdown of production figures is taken from Air International 1985, p. 187. Information as to when the first production aircraft emerged is from the serial number lists provided in Morgan and Shacklady 2000. Because the first XIVs were converted from existing Mk VIII airframes the first true production serial No. is listed. Protracted development of the Mk 21 meant that this variant did not reach operational service until January 1945.

Production by Mark
Mark	Built by	Numbers Built	Notes
F Mk XII	Supermarine	100	First Mk XII 13 October 1942
F Mk XIV, FR Mk XIV	Supermarine	957	First Mk XIV RB142 28 October 1943
F Mk XVIII	Supermarine	300	First Mk XVIII June 1945
PR Mk XIX	Supermarine	224	First Mk XIX RM626 May 1944
F Mk 21	Castle Bromwich	120	First Mk 21 LA187 27 January 1944
F Mk 22	Supermarine, Castle Bromwich	(27) + (260); 287	First Mk 22 March 1945
F Mk 24	Supermarine	54	First Mk 24 March 1946

== Specifications (Spitfire Mk.XIV) ==
General characteristics

- Crew: 1
- Length: 32 ft 8 in (9.96 m)
- Wingspan: 36 ft 10 in (11.23 m) (full span elliptical tips)
- Height: 10 ft 0 in (3.05 m)
- Wing area: 242.1 sq ft (22.49 m^{2})
- Airfoil: NACA 2213 (root), NACA 2209.4 (tip)
- Empty weight: 6,578 lb (2,984 kg)
- Gross weight: 7,923 lb (3,594 kg)
- Max takeoff weight: 8,400 lb (3,810 kg)
- Powerplant: 1 × Rolls-Royce Griffon 65 supercharged V12, 2,050 hp (1,530 kW) at 8,000 ft (2,438 m)
- Propellers: 5-bladed Jablo-Rotol

Performance

- Maximum speed: 441 mph (710 km/h, 383 kn) in FS supercharger gear at 29,500 ft. 391 mph in MS supercharger gear at 5,500 ft.
- Combat range: 460 mi (740 km, 400 nmi)
- Ferry range: 1,090 mi (1,760 km, 950 nmi)
- Service ceiling: 43,500 ft (13,300 m)
- Rate of climb: 5,040 ft/min (25.6 m/s) in MS supercharger gear at 2,100 ft. 3,550 ft/min in FS supercharger gear at 22,100 ft.
- Time to altitude: 7 mins to 22,000 ft (at max weight)
- Wing loading: 32.72 lb/sq ft (159.8 kg/m^{2})
- Power/mass: 0.24

Armament

- Guns: ** 2 × 20 mm (0.787-in) Hispano Mk II cannon, 120 rpg.
  - 4 × 0.303 in (7.7 mm) Browning machine guns, 350 rpg. Replaced by 2 x .50 in (12.7 mm) M2 Browning machine guns 250 rpg Mk XIVE and FR Mk XIV.

== See also ==
- Military history of the United Kingdom during World War II
- Rolls-Royce Merlin and Griffon

Related development

- Seafire
- Spiteful
- Seafang
- Supermarine Spitfire variants: specifications, performance and armament
- Supermarine Spitfire (early Merlin-powered variants)
- Supermarine Spitfire (late Merlin-powered variants)
