= Joseph Smith (aircraft designer) =

Aircraft designer

- Born: 25 May 1897
- Died: 20 February 1956 (aged 58); Chandler's Ford
- Education: Yardley Secondary School; Birmingham Municipal Technical School
- Engineering career
- Projects: Supermarine Spitfire
- Significant advance: Aircraft design
- Awards: CBE; Silver medal of the Royal Aeronautical Society

Joseph Smith CBE (25 May 1897 – 20 February 1956) was an English aircraft designer who took over as Chief Designer for Supermarine upon the death of R. J. Mitchell and led the team responsible for the subsequent development of the Supermarine Spitfire.

== Career ==
=== Early life ===
Joseph Smith was educated at the Yardley Secondary School and Birmingham Municipal Technical School. After leaving school he gained an apprenticeship with the Austin Motor Company at Longbridge, Birmingham in 1914. Following the outbreak of World War I he joined the Royal Naval Volunteer Reserve (RNVR) in 1914 and served on motor launches in the Mediterranean. After serving in the RNVR, he went back to Austin to finish his apprenticeship. After it was finished, he was appointed junior draughtsman in the aircraft department in 1919. He worked on the Austin Whippet which was designed to be an inexpensive single-seater aircraft. After the Whippet failed to attract sufficient sales Austin decided in 1920 to abandon aircraft production.

Smith who wished to continue his involvement in the aviation field moved in 1921 to Supermarine as a senior draughtsman, reporting to Chief Draughtsman Frank Holroyd.

Over the following years Smith took on more responsibility leading to in 1926 Frank Holroyd being formally designated as Assistant Chief Engineer, and Smith was designated as Chief Draughtsman. From then on Smith was involved in all of the Supermarine designs during the late 1920s and 1930s.

By 1927 Smith had a staff of 38 employees working under him in the drawing office.

Working under chief designer R. J. Mitchell, Smith was heavily involved with the early design of the Spitfire. Following the death of Mitchell in June 1937 his deputy Harold J. Payn was appointed chief designer. Following the placement of government orders for the Spitfire Smith was heavily involved in the design of the airframe's structure and preparation of production drawings.

=== Chief Designer ===
As war clouds gathered a security check in September 1939 identified that Payn had a German-born wife. Concerns about the risk this posed to a major war programme saw Payn dismissed. Smith was appointed acting manager of the design department and finally appointed chief designer in 1941 following approval from the Ministry of Aircraft Production.

Smith was confident that the Spitfire had great development potential and was unwilling to consider developing a replacement aircraft until the maximum capability had been obtained from the Spitfire. As a result he oversaw the development of the Spitfire and its naval version the Seafire through numerous variants, including introduction of the Rolls-Royce Griffon-engined series, all of which ensured that it remained a front-line fighter until superseded by jet fighters. The final development of the Spitfire was the Supermarine Spiteful and its naval version the Supermarine Seafang which retained a Spitfire-like fuselage, married to a new straight-tapered laminar flow wing, which gave Smith the opportunity to fit a wide-track inward-retracting undercarriage.

=== Post-war activities ===
Following his piston-engined aircraft Smith designed the first British naval jet fighter, the Supermarine Attacker, using the Spiteful wing, which saw service with the Royal Navy.

Following the Attacker he oversaw the design of the Type 510 a swept-wing jet fighter which was developed into the Supermarine Swift. Following the Swift came the Supermarine 525 and Supermarine Scimitar.

While he was mainly involved in the development of fighter aircraft in the post-war era he was also the chief designer of the Seagull, an amphibian flying boat.

Smith was appointed as a special director of Vickers-Armstrongs Ltd in 1948 and served as chairman of the Technical Board and Technical Executive Committee of the Society of British Aircraft Constructors from 1948 to 1951.

He also served as Chairman of the Aircraft Industries Standards Committee, and as a member of the Engineering Divisional Council of the British Standards Institute.

He died of cancer at Chandler's Ford on 20 February 1956.

== Honours ==
He was awarded a CBE in 1946 in recognition of his war efforts.

In 1950 he was awarded the silver medal of the Royal Aeronautical Society.

In 1956 the Royal Aeronautical Society posthumously awarded Smith the British Gold Medal for work of an outstanding nature in aeronautics.
