= Supermarine Spiteful =

1944 British fighter aircraft

Spiteful
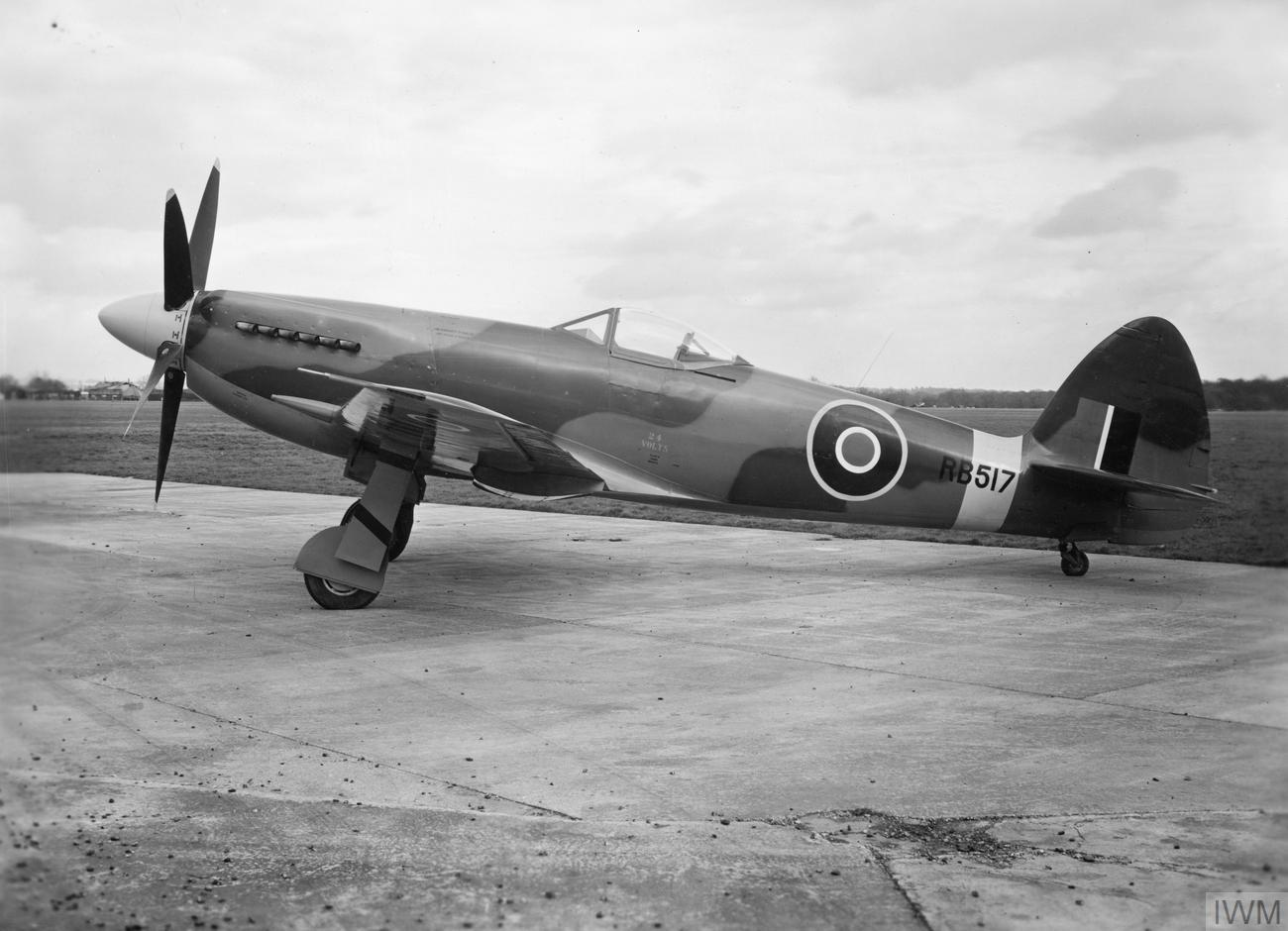
- Supermarine Spiteful F.XIV, RB517

General information
- Type: Fighter
- National origin: United Kingdom
- Manufacturer: Supermarine
- Designer: Joseph Smith
- Service: Royal Air Force
- Prototypes: NN660, NN664, and NN667
- Number built: 19 (including the three prototypes)

History
- First flight: 30 June 1944
- Developed from: Supermarine Spitfire
- Developed into: Supermarine Seafang; Supermarine Attacker

The Supermarine Spiteful was a British fighter aircraft designed by Supermarine during the Second World War as a successor to the Spitfire. Powered by a Rolls-Royce Griffon engine, it had a radical new wing design to allow safe operations at higher speeds and incorporating inwards-retracting undercarriage. Other changes included a larger fin to improve the marginal stability of Griffon Spitfires. Development of the wing was formalised by Air Ministry specification F.1/43; as well as a new aircraft, there was an expectation the wing could be used as a replacement for the elliptical wing on Spitfire production.

The Spiteful was ready for production as the war was ending but in testing had shown only marginal improvements over existing types and was now being overtaken by jet-powered designs. Of the original order for 150 Spitefuls, only 19 were built. The Royal Navy opted for a navalised variation of the Spiteful type, the Supermarine Seafang, but few of those were built either. The wing developed for the Spiteful was used for the Supermarine Attacker jet.

== Design and development ==
=== Background ===
In 1942, to improve the rolling characteristics of the Supermarine Spitfire, the British Air Ministry asked Supermarine to devise a new wing for the aircraft and to incorporate a laminar flow wing section in the new design. By November that year, the company's chief designer, Joseph Smith, was working on the new wing. It became clear to the Supermarine design team that the Spitfire's performance at speeds greater than 480 miles per hour (770 km/h) was compromised by the aeroelasticity of its elliptical wing. (Note: The engine of the 1935 prototype Spitfire was the Rolls-Royce Merlin, then the most powerful engine available. It produced about 950 horsepower (710 kW). The secondary structure of the Spitfire's wing needed to be as light as possible to keep the power/weight ratio, and therefore performance, as high as possible.) R.J. Mitchell's original elliptical design had been regularly strengthened and modified during the war to cope with increases in engine power, but if the Spitfire was to fly still higher and faster, a radical new design of wing would be needed. The design progressed in collaboration with the National Physical Laboratory at Teddington.

In September 1942, Supermarine used Specification No 469, which outlined the first steps towards designing the Type 371, later named the Spiteful. Specification No 470 was issued by Supermarine on 30 November,

A new wing has been designed for the Spitfire with the following objects: 1) To raise as much as possible the critical speed at which drag increases, due to compressibility, become serious. 2) To obtain a rate of roll faster than any existing fighter. 3) To reduce wing profile drag and thereby improve performance. The wing area had been reduced from 242 sq ft (22.5 m^{2}) to 210 sq ft (20 m^{2}), and a thickness to chord ratio of 13% had been used over the inner wing where the equipment is stored. Outboard the wing tapers to 8% thickness/chord at the tip.

Specification 470 described how the wing skins were to be relatively thick, aiding rotational stiffness, which was needed for good aileron control at high speeds. Although the prototype was to have a dihedral of 3° it was intended that this would be increased in subsequent aircraft. To improve the aircraft's ground handling, the Spitfire's outward-retracting undercarriage was replaced with one that was inward-retracting, so that the wheels were further apart. This eliminated a weakness in the original Spitfire design which had made it comparatively difficult to land.

The Air Ministry was impressed by the proposals. In February 1943 it issued Specification F.1/43 for a single-seat fighter with a laminar flow wing; there was also to be provision made for the pilot to have good visibility, for the wings to fold, to meet possible Fleet Air Arm requirements, for an armament of 4 × 20 mm (0.787 in) cannon, and for the propellers to be contra-rotating. Specification F.1/43 stated that the new fighter was to use a fuselage based on a Spitfire Mk VIII. Three aircraft with contra-rotating propellers were ordered under the specification which was largely experimental to test the wing and a contra-rotating propeller. Supermarine was initially left to decide whether to use a Merlin or Griffon; this was altered to the first two aircraft were to be built with Griffons and the third with a Merlin, all with the contra-rotating propeller. The specification also called for the wing to be used on Mark VIII or Mark 21 Spitfire airframes (with Merlin and Griffon engines respectively) with the expectation that it would be used on production lines from the end of 1944. However, the changes to the wing spar spacing meant the wing would not be a straight replacement. Internally Supermarine identified the wing as the Type 371 which—by extension—was used to refer to the aircraft design as a whole. (Note: The prototype programme was later revised to one Mk VIII Spitfire fuselage with new wing and contra-rotating Griffon, one Type 371 with contra-rotating Griffon and a Type 371 with Merlin and regular propeller. The change to the latter was due to no contra-rotating Merlin gearing having been ordered into production.)

=== Prototype trials ===
The new wing was fitted to a modified Spitfire XIV (serial NN660)—the specification having been amended by the Air Ministry from its original instruction for a Mk VIII fuselage to be used. The Mk XIV was chosen so that the new wing could be directly compared with the earlier elliptical wing. The aircraft was planned to fly for the first time on 15 March 1944, but delays to the construction of the new wing meant that the aircraft could not be delivered on time.

NN660 was first flown by Supermarine's chief test pilot Jeffrey Quill from Vickers' flight development site at RAF High Post, Wiltshire, on 30 June 1944. Although the new Spitfire's speed performance was comfortably in excess of an unmodified Spitfire XIV, the wing displayed issues at the stall which, although acceptable, did not come up to the high standards of the Spitfire's earlier elliptical wing. NN660 crashed on 13 September 1944 during an improvised low altitude mock-combat with a standard Spitfire XIV. The test pilot Frank Furlong was killed. No reason for the loss was established, although the subsequent accident report discussed the possibility that the aileron control rods had momentarily seized or become disconnected during the flight. Quill encountered a similar problem one day when the ailerons jammed during "a high g turn" in NN664 but he had the altitude to recover. The controls were afterwards redesigned, which caused the first flight of the second prototype (NN664) to be delayed. By December Supermarine was being criticised by the Ministry for slow progress on the aircraft. Flight testing showed that performance was better than that of the equivalent Spitfire, but not as good as expected, and anything (including splashes of mud or dead insects) on the wing broke the laminar flow and reduced speed.

The Spitfire's fuselage was redesigned to improve the pilot's sightline for deflection shooting and to use a larger fin and rudder to eliminate directional instability. (Note: The enlarged fin/rudder of the Spiteful was used on the Spitfire Mark 22 and 24 and Seafire Mks 46 and 47 and was usually referred to as the "Spiteful type" tail.) The instability had arisen following the introduction of the more powerful Griffon engine and was exacerbated by the introduction of the four-bladed and subsequent five-bladed Rotol propeller airscrews. At the same time Supermarine designed the airframe so it could take either Griffon or Merlin engines. The updated design incorporated the new fuselage but not the enlarged fin/rudder. NN664 first flew on 8 January 1945, still unpainted. Subsequent modifications used to try to resolve faults found during trial flights included altering the wing section, and enlarging the fin, rudder, tailplane and elevators. The enlarged tail improved handling but caused a further drop in top speed.

The Spiteful was found to be faster than the Spitfire, but the increase in speed was not as great as had been expected. The Spiteful had more adverse compressibility effects and poorer stalling characteristics than its predecessor.

=== Name ===
As early as 1943, the service name for any new type emerging from the Spitfire was under discussion. "Victor" was an option that was discussed by the Air Council (the governing body of the RAF), but this name was considered to have an air of overconfidence, and it lacked any suggestion of speed or aggression. The introduction of a new design to replace the Spitfire's original elliptical wing, which dated from the 1930s, prompted fresh discussions. Objections were raised against using the name Spitfire for a type that differed substantially from Mitchell's original design, though those using the Spitfire (from pilots to AOC Fighter Command) were against any change. The opinion of the Air Member for Supply and Organisation was that: "...no reason for giving the name Spitfire to what was a different aircraft and not another Spitfire. Little about the new aircraft was interchangeable with the Spitfire, and continuance of the latter name would be a nuisance from the supply point of view."

The Air Council was told in October 1943 that the British Prime Minister Winston Churchill was "interested in the choice of name" and wanted to discuss it with the Secretary of State. Sir Charles Portal, the Chief of the Air Staff, thought the name Valiant was much better than Victor. In November, needing to settle the matter, the Council decided that the Spitfire XXI would be named Valiant, provided the Admiralty agreed. However, Supermarine objected to Valiant and wanted one starting with the letter S. Portal suggested Spiteful which was accepted without discussion at a meeting in March 1944.

== Production ==
The Spiteful was ordered into production as the Spiteful F.XIV, the numerals being carried over from the original Spitfire Mk XIV. The numbering was chosen to allow for Merlin-engined variants though ultimately none were built. In total, 650 aircraft were ordered from Supermarine. The number contracted to be built was first reduced by 260 aircraft; a second cancellation left 80 machines to be built. The third and final cancellation reduced the size of the contract to 22 aircraft. The first production aircraft, RB515, flew for 15 minutes on 2 April 1945. A week later, it sustained damage when Quill had to make a forced landing at RAF Boscombe Down but was repaired and returned to flight.

With the advent of jet propulsion, the order was cancelled in May 1945, a few days before the end of the war in Europe, with only a handful of Spitefuls built. Supermarine received a replacement order for 150 Seafangs. A few Spitefuls were taken "on charge" for evaluation by the RAF but did not see squadron service. NN664 was delivered for official trials at Boscombe Down in June 1945, followed by NN667 between February and June the following year. The assessment was "below average" with criticism of the cockpit layout and time to refuel and rearm. By March 1946, Supermarine was informed that the RAF only needed the Spiteful as a "low altitude attack aircraft" and during the year RB516 was sent to the Aeroplane & Armament Experimental Establishment to see if the design had value as a fighter-bomber. (Note: Supermarine had been told in August 1945 that the Spiteful had been removed from the fighter programme though kept as a fighter-bomber) When the company objected, the Spiteful project was finally abandoned. In July 1948, 13 of the Spitefuls were sold for scrap.

== Variants ==
There were three variants of the type defined. Of the aircraft produced, those with the Griffon 69 engine and a five blade Rotol propeller were given the designation F. Mk 14. The two other variants, F Mk 15 and F Mk 16, differed only in the engine variant used or the number of propeller blades:

Variant	Engine	Weight	Maximum speed	Notes
F Mk 14	Griffon 69 with five blade Rotol and short intake 2,375 hp (1,771 kW)	9,950 lb (4,510 kg)	483 mph (777 km/h) at 21,000 feet (6,400 m)	19 built (two prototypes and 17 production: RB515–RB525, RB527–RB531, RB535).
F Mk 15	Griffon 85 (Note: Buttler gives Griffon 89 or 90 as the engine) with six blade contra-rotating propeller 2,350 hp (1,750 kW)	10,200 lb (4,600 kg)	476 mph (766 km/h)	1 built: (Note: No photographs of a F. Mk 15 are known) RB520, which was fitted with a hook as an interim Seafang prototype in early 1945.
F Mk 16	Griffon 101 2,420 hp (1,800 kW)	9,950 lb (4,510 kg) at take-off	494 mph (795 km/h) at 28,500 ft (8,700 m); 408 mph (657 km/h) at sea level	Conversion of RB518, which was used for propeller development with a Griffon 101 engine and a two-stage three-speed supercharger in 1948 and later designated as the F. Mk 16). Its 494 mph (at 27,500 ft) was a record for a British piston engine aircraft.

== Further development ==
=== "Jet Spiteful" ===
In late 1943 or early 1944, Smith proposed that the company develop a simple jet fighter based around the Spiteful's wing. (Note: Supermarine had suggested an aircraft using the Halford H.1 jet engine with a Spitfire wing in 1942.) and the new jet engine being developed by Rolls-Royce. (Note: At the time known as the B.41, the engine was later called the Rolls-Royce Nene.) Smith's Type 392 proposal was accepted, as the wing was judged suitable for jet aircraft, and specification E.10/44 was issued by the Air Ministry for an experimental aircraft that was initially referred to as the '"Jet Spiteful" (and "Jet Seafang" for a navalised version) with a contract for three prototypes. A contract for 6 E.10/44 and 18 E.1/45 (the specification for the naval version) followed in July. (Note: The 18 naval aircraft were cancelled 1946 and 18 Sea Vampires ordered.) The prototype Supermarine Type 392 (TS409), first flew on 27 July 1946. The E.10/44 was not ordered by the Royal Air Force (RAF) due to its performance not being much better than the Gloster Meteor and de Havilland Vampire.

The Admiralty expressed an interest in the aircraft for use as a naval fighter and issued specification E.1/45 around it. The aircraft, named the Supermarine Attacker, was the Royal Navy's first jet aircraft. It had a short career with the Royal Navy during the 1950s, and served with the Pakistan Air Force until 1964.

=== Supermarine Seafang ===
During the mid-1940s there was some uncertainty over whether jet aircraft would be able to operate from the Royal Navy's aircraft carriers so it was decided to develop a naval version of the Spiteful, to specification N.5/45, subsequently named the Seafang. The initial prototype was a converted Spiteful XV (RB520) with an arrestor hook fitted. The first full Seafang prototype was VB895. This was followed by 10 Seafang F.Mk 31, two of which were marked up as further prototypes (VG471 and VG474). The final fully navalised F Mk 32 version differed in that it had folding wingtips, a "sting"-type arrester hook, and two three-blade contra-rotating propellers. However, only the two prototypes (VB893 and VB895) are known to have been completed. With the introduction of the Supermarine Attacker from August 1951, the need for the Seafang disappeared. Smith's laminar flow wing design was used for the Supermarine Type 391, a variant of the aircraft.

== Specifications (Spiteful XIV) ==
Drawings of the Spiteful Mk.XIV, showing both the elliptical tailplane of the Spitfire and the new wing design

Data from Supermarine Aircraft since 1914

General characteristics

- Crew: 1
- Length: 32 ft 11 in (10.03 m)
- Wingspan: 35 ft (11 m)
- Height: 13 ft 5 in (4.09 m)
- Wing area: 210 sq ft (20 m^{2})
- Airfoil: root: Supermarine 371-I; tip: Supermarine 371-II
- Empty weight: 7,350 lb (3,334 kg)
- Gross weight: 9,950 lb (4,513 kg)
- Powerplant: 1 × Rolls-Royce Griffon 69 V-12 liquid-cooled piston engine, 2,375 hp (1,771 kW)
- Propellers: 5-bladed constant-speed propeller

Performance

- Maximum speed: 483 mph (777 km/h, 420 kn) at 21,000 ft (6,400 m)
- Cruise speed: 240 mph (390 km/h, 210 kn) at 255 mph (222 kn; 410 km/h)
- Range: 564 mi (908 km, 490 nmi)
- Service ceiling: 42,000 ft (13,000 m)
- Rate of climb: 4,890 ft/min (24.8 m/s) at 2,000 ft (610 m)

Armament

- Guns: 4 × 20 mm (0.787 in) Hispano Mk.V cannon with 156 rpg
- Rockets: 8–12 × RP-3 rocket projectiles

or 4 × 300 lb (140 kg) rockets

- Bombs: 2 × 1,000 lb (450 kg) bombs

== See also ==
Aircraft of comparable role, configuration, and era

- CAC CA-15
- Fiat G.56
- Hawker Sea Fury
- Martin-Baker MB 5
- Messerschmitt Me 309
- North American P-51 Mustang
- Yakovlev Yak-9

== Sources ==
- Andrews, C. F. & Morgan, Eric B. (1981). Supermarine Aircraft since 1914. London: Putnam. ISBN 978-0-370-10018-0.
- Bowyer, Chaz (1980). Supermarine Spitfire. London: Arms and Armour Press. ISBN 978-08536-8-464-0.
- Buttler, Tony (2004). Fighters & Bombers, 1935–1950. British Secret Projects. Vol. III. Hinckley, UK: Midlands Publishing. ISBN 978-1-85780-179-8.
- Buttler, Tony (2012). British Experimental Combat Aircraft of World War II: Prototypes, Research Aircraft and Failed Production Designs. Manchester, UK: Hikoki Publications. ISBN 978-19021-0-924-4.
- Delve, Ken (2007). The Story of the Spitfire: An Operational and Combat History. London: Greenhill. ISBN 978-18536-7-725-0.
- Jackson, Robert (2007). Britain's Greatest Aircraft. Barnsley, UK: Pen and Sword Books Ltd. ISBN 978-18441-5-600-9.
- Meikle, Nick (2014). Malloch's Spitfire: The Story and Restoration of PK350. Oxford, UK: Casemate Publishers (Ignition). ISBN 978-16120-0-253-8.
- Morgan, Eric B.; Shacklady, Edward (2000). Spitfire: The History (5th ed.). London: Key Publishing. ISBN 978-0-946219-48-3.
- Pegram, Ralph (2022). Supermarine Secret Projects. Vol. 2: Fighters and Bombers. Mortons.
- Quill, Jeffrey (1986). Spitfire: A Test Pilot's Story. London: Arrow Books. ISBN 978-0-09-937020-8.
- Robertson, Bruce (1960). Spitfire: The Story of a Famous Fighter. Hemel Hempstead, UK: Model & Allied Publications Ltd. ISBN 0-900435-11-9.
- Thetford, Owen (1946). Russell, Douglas Arthur (ed.). Aircraft of the Fighting Powers. Vol. 7. Leicester, UK: Harborough Publishing Company Limited. OCLC 774473103.
- White, Graham (2019). Allied Aircraft Piston Engines of World War II (2nd ed.). Warrendale, Pennsylvania: SAE International. ISBN 978-07680-9-554-8.
