= Rolls-Royce Griffon =

1930s British piston aircraft engine

Griffon
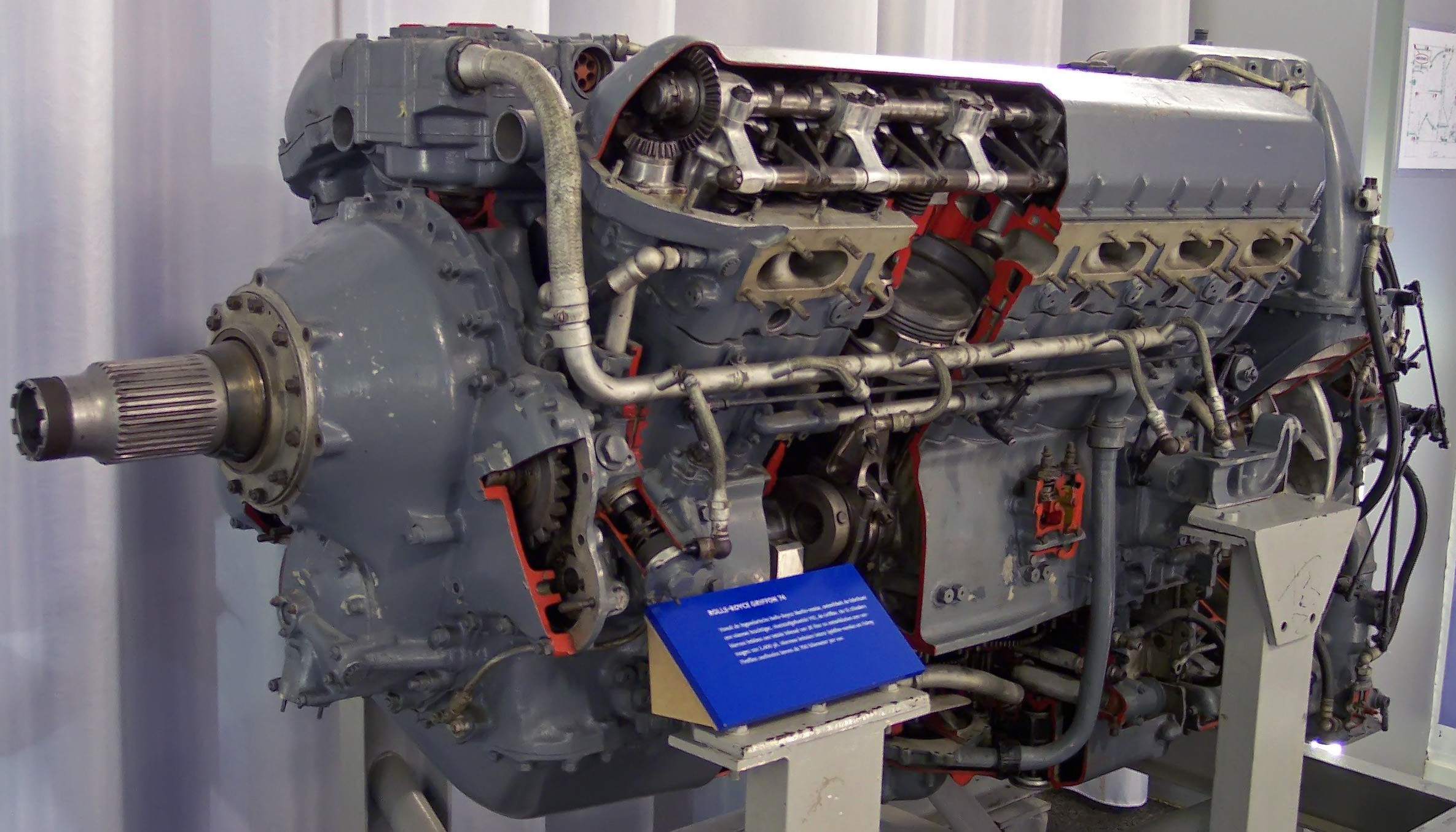
- Preserved Rolls-Royce Griffon with cutaway sections.
- Type: Liquid-cooled V12 four-stroke piston aero engine
- Manufacturer: Rolls-Royce
- First run: November 1939
- Major applications: Avro Shackleton; Fairey Firefly; Supermarine Spitfire
- Number built: 8,108

The Rolls-Royce Griffon is a British 37-litre (2,240 cu in) capacity, 60-degree V12, liquid-cooled aero engine designed and built by Rolls-Royce Limited. In keeping with company convention, the Griffon was named after a bird of prey, in this case the griffon vulture.

Design work on the Griffon started in 1938 at the request of the Fleet Air Arm, for use in new aircraft designs such as the Fairey Firefly. In 1939 it was also decided that the engine could be adapted for use in the Spitfire. Development was stopped temporarily to concentrate efforts on the smaller Merlin and the 24-cylinder Vulture; the engine did not go into production until the early 1940s.

The Griffon was the last in the line of V12 aero engines to be produced by Rolls-Royce with production ceasing in 1955. Griffon engines remain in Royal Air Force service today with the Battle of Britain Memorial Flight.

== Design and development ==
=== Origins ===
The first Griffon-powered Spitfire IV, DP845

According to Arthur Rubbra's memoirs, a de-rated version of the "R" engine, known by the name Griffon at that time, was tested in 1933. This engine, R11, which was never flown, was used for "Moderately Supercharged Buzzard development" (which was not proceeded with until much later), and bore no direct relationship to the volume-produced Griffon of the 1940s.

In 1938, the Fleet Air Arm approached Rolls-Royce and asked whether a larger version of the Merlin could be designed. The requirements were that the new engine have good power at low altitude and that it be reliable and easy to service. Work began on the design of the engine soon afterwards. (Note: Although the Griffon from 1933 shared the R engine's bore and stroke with the Griffon I of 1939, the Griffon I was a completely new design.) The design process was relatively smooth compared with that of the Merlin, and the first of three prototype Griffon Is first ran in the Experimental Department on 30 November 1939.

Although the Griffon was designed for naval aircraft, on 8 November 1939 N. E. Rowe of the Air Ministry suggested fitting the Griffon in a Spitfire. Three weeks later, permission was given to Supermarine to explore the possibilities of adapting the Griffon to the Spitfire; Supermarine issued 'Specification 466' on 4 December. This decision led to a change in the disposition of the engine accessories to reduce the frontal area of the engine as much as possible. The frontal area of the bare Griffon engine was 7.9 square feet (0.73 m^{2}) compared with 7.5 square feet (0.70 m^{2}) of the Merlin, despite the Griffon's much larger capacity. This redesigned engine first ran on 26 June 1940 and went into production as the Griffon II.

In early 1940, with the expected Battle of Britain looming, on the orders of Lord Beaverbrook, Minister of Aircraft Production, work on the new engine was halted temporarily to concentrate on the smaller 27 L (1,650 cu in) Merlin which had already surpassed the output achieved with the early Griffon.

=== Design ===
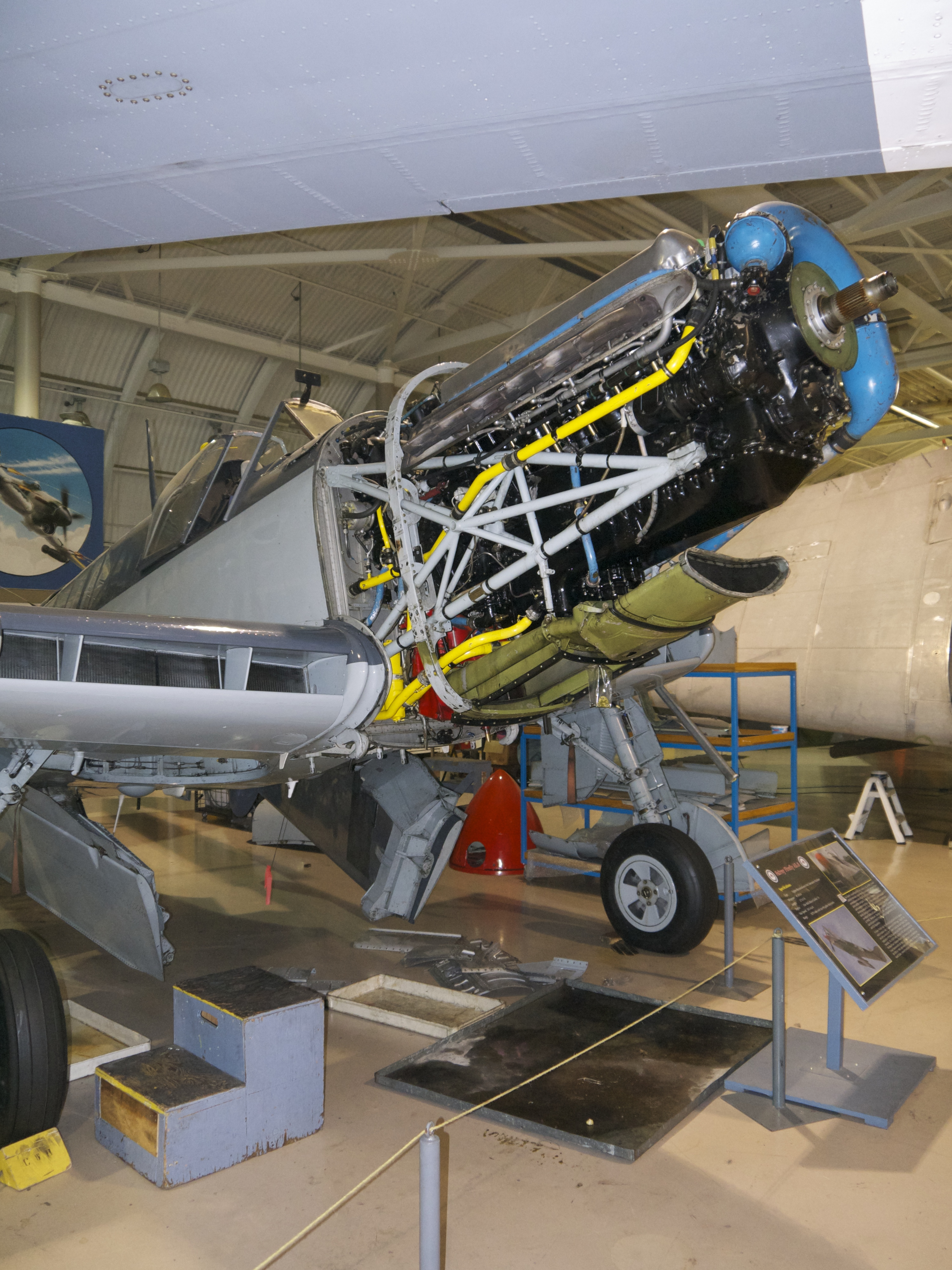
A Griffon installed on WH632, an airworthy Fairey Firefly at the Canadian Warplane Heritage Museum (2014)

Compared with earlier Rolls-Royce designs, the Griffon engine featured several improvements, which meant that it was physically only slightly larger than the Merlin, in spite of its 36% larger capacity of 37-litres (2,240 cu in).

One significant difference was the incorporation of the camshaft and magneto drives into the propeller speed reduction unit at the front of the engine, rather than using a separate system of gears driven from the back end of the crankshaft; this allowed the overall length of the engine to be reduced as well as making the drive train more reliable and efficient. (Note: Incorporating four sets of gears (two camshaft drives, plus propeller reduction gears and magneto drive) into one unit meant that the extra group of gears for the magnetos and camshafts, which were normally mounted at the rear of the crankshaft, could be omitted.) The drive for the supercharger was also taken from the front of the engine, which required a long shaft to run to its location at the back of the engine.

The Merlin engine's crankshaft lubrication was via a gallery cut into the engine block to feed each main bearing and then onto a secondary adjacent big end bearing via a gallery in the crankshaft itself. The crankpin was second in line to the main bearing in oil flow and pressure, with oil having to flow through the main bearing first. The Griffon improved on this arrangement being the first Rolls-Royce production aero engine to use a hollow crankshaft as the means of lubricating the main and big end bearings, with oil being fed from each end of the crankshaft giving even flow to all bearings.

In another change from convention, one high efficiency B.T.H-manufactured dual magneto was mounted on top of the propeller reduction casing; earlier Rolls-Royce designs using twin magnetos mounted at the rear of the engine.

The Griffon 61 series introduced a two-stage supercharger and other design changes: the pressure oil pumps were now housed internally within the sump and an effort was made to remove as many external pipes as possible. In addition, the drive for the supercharger was moved to the crankshaft at the back of the engine, via a short torsion shaft, rather than at the front of the engine, using a long drive shaft as used by earlier Griffon variants.

Production of the aero version of the Griffon ended in December 1955, while a marine version, the Sea Griffon, continued to be produced for the RAF's High Speed Launches.

=== Basic component overview (Griffon 65) ===
From Jane's and Flight.

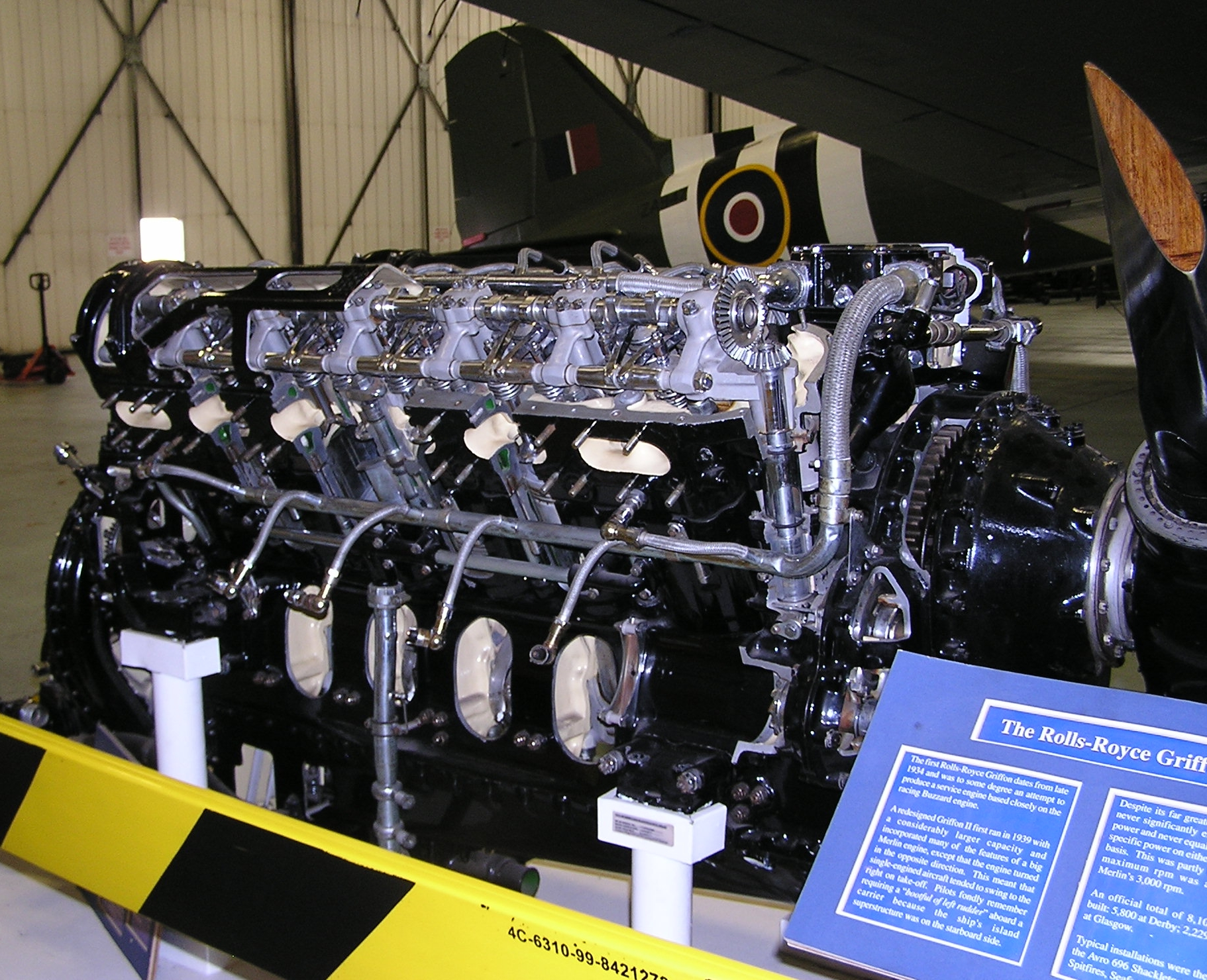
Griffon, cut away to show camshaft drives etc., at the Battle of Britain Museum at RAF Coningsby

Cylinders
Twelve cylinders consisting of high-carbon steel, floating wet liners set in two, two-piece cylinder blocks of cast aluminium alloy having separate heads and skirts. Cylinder liners chromium plated in the bores for 2.5 in (64 mm) from the head. Cylinder blocks mounted with an included 60-degree angle onto inclined upper faces of a two-piece crankcase. Cylinder heads fitted with cast-iron inlet valve guides, phosphor bronze exhaust valve guides, and renewable "Silchrome" steel-alloy valve seats. Two diametrically opposed spark plugs protrude into each combustion chamber.
Pistons
Machined from "R.R.59" alloy forgings. Fully floating gudgeon pins of hardened nickel-chrome steel. Two compression and one drilled oil-control ring above the gudgeon pin, and another drilled oil-control ring below.
Connecting rods
H-section machined nickel-steel forgings, each pair consisting of a plain and a forked rod. The forked rod carries a nickel-steel bearing block which accommodates steel-backed lead-bronze-alloy bearing shells. The "small-end" of each rod houses a floating phosphor bronze bush.
Crankshaft
One-piece, machined from a nitrogen-hardened nickel-chrome molybdenum steel forging. Statically and dynamically balanced. Seven main bearings and six throws. Internal oilway, with feed from both ends, used to distribute lubricants to main and big end bearings. "Floating" front end bearing consisting of an internally toothed annulus bolted to crankshaft, meshing with and incorporating a semi-floating ring, internally splined to a short coupling shaft. Coupling shaft splined at front end to driving wheel of propeller reduction gear. Clockwise rotation when viewed from rear.
Crankcase
Two aluminium-alloy castings joined on the horizontal centreline. The upper portion bears the wheelcase, cylinder blocks and part of the housing for the airscrew reduction gear; and carries the crankshaft main bearings (split mild-steel shells lined with lead–bronze alloy). The lower half forms an oil sump and carries the main pressure oil pump, supercharger change-speed operating pump and two scavenge pumps. It also houses the main coolant pump which is driven through the same gear-train as the oil pumps.
Wheelcase
Aluminium-alloy casting fitted to rear of crankcase. Carries the supercharger; and houses drives to the supercharger, auxiliary gearbox coupling, engine speed indicator, airscrew constant-speed unit, intercooler pump and fuel pump, as well as the oil and coolant pumps in the lower half crankcase.
Valve gear
Two inlet and two exhaust poppet valves of "K.E.965" austenitic nickel-chrome steel per cylinder. Exhaust valves have sodium-cooled stems. "Brightray" (nickel-chromium) protective coating to the whole of the combustion face and seat of the exhaust valves, and to the seat only of the inlet valves. Each valve is held closed by a pair of concentric coil springs. A single, seven-bearing camshaft, located centrally on the top of each cylinder head operates 24 individual steel rockers; 12 pivoting from a rocker shaft on the inner, intake side of the block to actuate the exhaust valves, the others pivoting from a shaft on the exhaust side of the block to actuate the inlet valves.

=== Engine capacity, mass flow, and supercharging ===
Although it is common practice to compare different piston engines and their performance potential by referring to the engine displacement or swept volume, this does not give an accurate reading of an engine's capabilities. According to A C Lovesey, who was in charge of the Merlin's development, (Note: After helping design the two-stage, two-speed supercharger for the Merlin Lovesey went on to help develop the Rolls-Royce jet engines; although the quote refers to the Merlin it applies equally as well to the Griffon.) "The impression still prevails that the static capacity known as the swept volume is the basis of comparison of the possible power output for different types of engine, but this is not the case because the output of the engine depends solely on the mass of air it can be made to consume efficiently, and in this respect the supercharger plays the most important role."

Unlike the Merlin, the Griffon was designed from the outset to use a single-stage supercharger driven by a two-speed, hydraulically operated gearbox; the initial production versions, the Griffon II, III, IV, and VI series, were designed to give their maximum power at low altitudes and were mainly used by the Fleet Air Arm. The Griffon 60, 70, and 80 series featured two-stage supercharging and achieved their maximum power at low to medium altitudes. The Griffon 101, 121, and 130 series engines, collectively designated Griffon 3 SML, used a two-stage, three-speed supercharger, adding a set of "Low Supercharger (L.S)" gears to the already existing Medium and Full Supercharger (M.S and F.S) gears. Another modification was to increase the diameters of both impellers, thus increasing the rated altitudes at which maximum power could be generated in each gear. While the 101 continued to drive a five-blade propeller, the 121 and 130 series were designed to drive contra-rotating propellers. In 1946 a Griffon 101 was fitted to the Supermarine Spiteful XVI, RB518 (a re-engined production Mk.XIV); this aircraft achieved a maximum speed of 494 mph (795 km/h) with full military equipment.

=== Pilot transition ===
Pilots who converted from the Merlin to the Griffon-engined Spitfires soon discovered that, because the Griffon engine's propeller rotated in the opposite direction to that of the Merlin, the fighter swung to the right on takeoff rather than to the left. (Note: The propeller of the Griffon rotated to the left (counter-clockwise) when viewed from the cockpit.) This tendency was even more marked with the more powerful 60- and 80-series Griffon engines, with their five-bladed propellers. As a result, pilots had to learn to apply left (port) trim on takeoff, instead of the right (starboard) trim they were used to applying. On takeoff, the throttle had to be opened slowly, as the pronounced swing to the right could lead to "crabbing" and severe tyre wear.

Some test Spitfire XIVs, 21s, and 24s were fitted with contra-rotating propellers, which eliminated the torque effect. Early problems with the complex gearbox that was required for contra-rotating propellers prevented them from ever becoming operational in Spitfires, but they were used on later aircraft, including the Seafire FR. Mk 46 and F and FR.47, which were fitted with Griffon 87s driving contra-rotating propellers as standard equipment. The Griffon 57 and 57A series, installed in Universal Power Plant (UPP) installations and driving contra-rotating propellers, was used in the Avro Shackleton maritime patrol aircraft.

== Variants ==
The Griffon was produced in approximately 50 different variants, the Griffon 130 being the last in the series. Details of representative variants are listed below:

- Griffon IIB

1,730 hp (1,290 kW) at 750 ft (230 m) and 1,490 hp (1,110 kW) at 14,000 ft (4,270 m); Single-stage two-speed supercharger; impeller diameter 10 in (254 mm); gear ratios 7.85:1, 10.68:1. Used on Firefly Mk.I and Spitfire XII.

- Griffon VI

Increased maximum boost pressure, 1,850 hp (1,380 kW) at 2,000 ft (610 m); impeller diameter 9.75 in (247 mm). Used on Seafire Mk.XV and Mk. XVII, Spitfire XII.

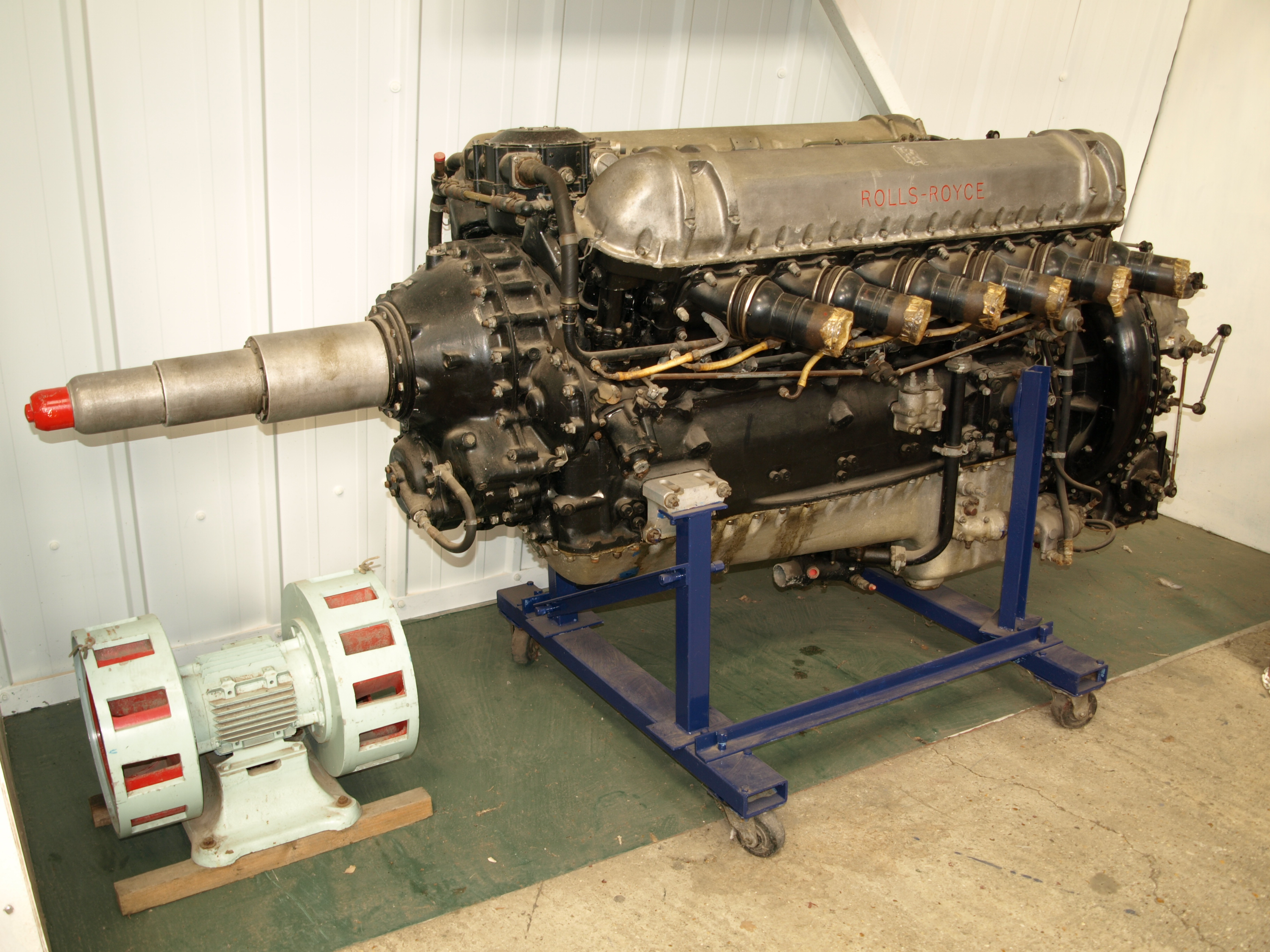
A Rolls-Royce Griffon 58 displayed at the Shuttleworth Collection (2008)

- Griffon 57 and 57A

1,960 hp (1,460 kW); 2,345 hp (1,749 kW) with water-methanol injection on take-off: used on Avro Shackleton.

- Griffon 61

Introduced a two-speed two-stage supercharger with aftercooler similar to that on Merlin 61; 2,035 hp (1,520 kW) at 7,000 ft (2,100 m) and 1,820 hp (1,360 kW) at 21,000 ft (6,400 m); used on Spitfire F.Mk.XIV, Mk.21.

- Griffon 65

Similar to Griffon 61 with different propeller reduction gear; Impeller diameters 1st stage: 13.4 in (340 mm), 2nd stage: 11.3 in (290 mm); used on Spitfire F.Mk.XIV.

- Griffon 72

Increased maximum boost pressure to take advantage of 150-grade fuel; 2,245 hp (1,675 kW) at 9,250 ft (2,820 m).

- Griffon 74

Fuel-injected version of Griffon 72; used on Firefly Mk.IV.

- Griffon 83

Modified to drive contra-rotating propellers; 2,340 hp (1,745 kW) at 750 ft (230 m) and 2,100 hp (1,565 kW) at 12,250 ft (3,740 m).

- Griffon 85

2,375 hp (1,770 kW); used on Spiteful Mk.XIV.

- Griffon 89

2,350 hp (1,755 kW); used on Spiteful Mk.XV.

- Griffon 101

2,420 hp (1,805 kW); Two-stage, three-speed supercharger using Low Supercharger (L.S), Moderate Supercharger (M.S), or Full Supercharger (F.S); reduction gear ratio 4.45; Rolls-Royce fuel injection system. Used on Spiteful Mk.XVI.

- Griffon 130

2,420 hp (1,805 kW) at 5,000 ft (1,524 m) in L.S gear, 2,250 hp (1,678 kW) at 14,500 ft (4,419 m) M.S and 2,050 hp (1,529 kW) at 21,000 ft (6,400 m) F.S; reduction gear ratio 4.44; modified to drive contra-rotating propellers; Rolls-Royce fuel injection system.

- Compound Griffon RGC.30.SM.; turbo-compound engine - cancelled 1949
- Turbo Griffon RGT.30.SM.; similar to Napier Nomad - as above

== Applications ==
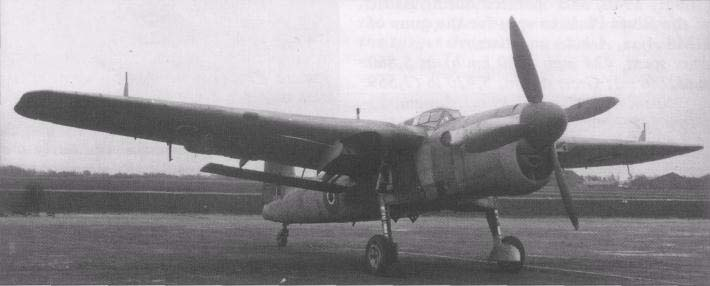
Griffon-engined Fairey Barracuda

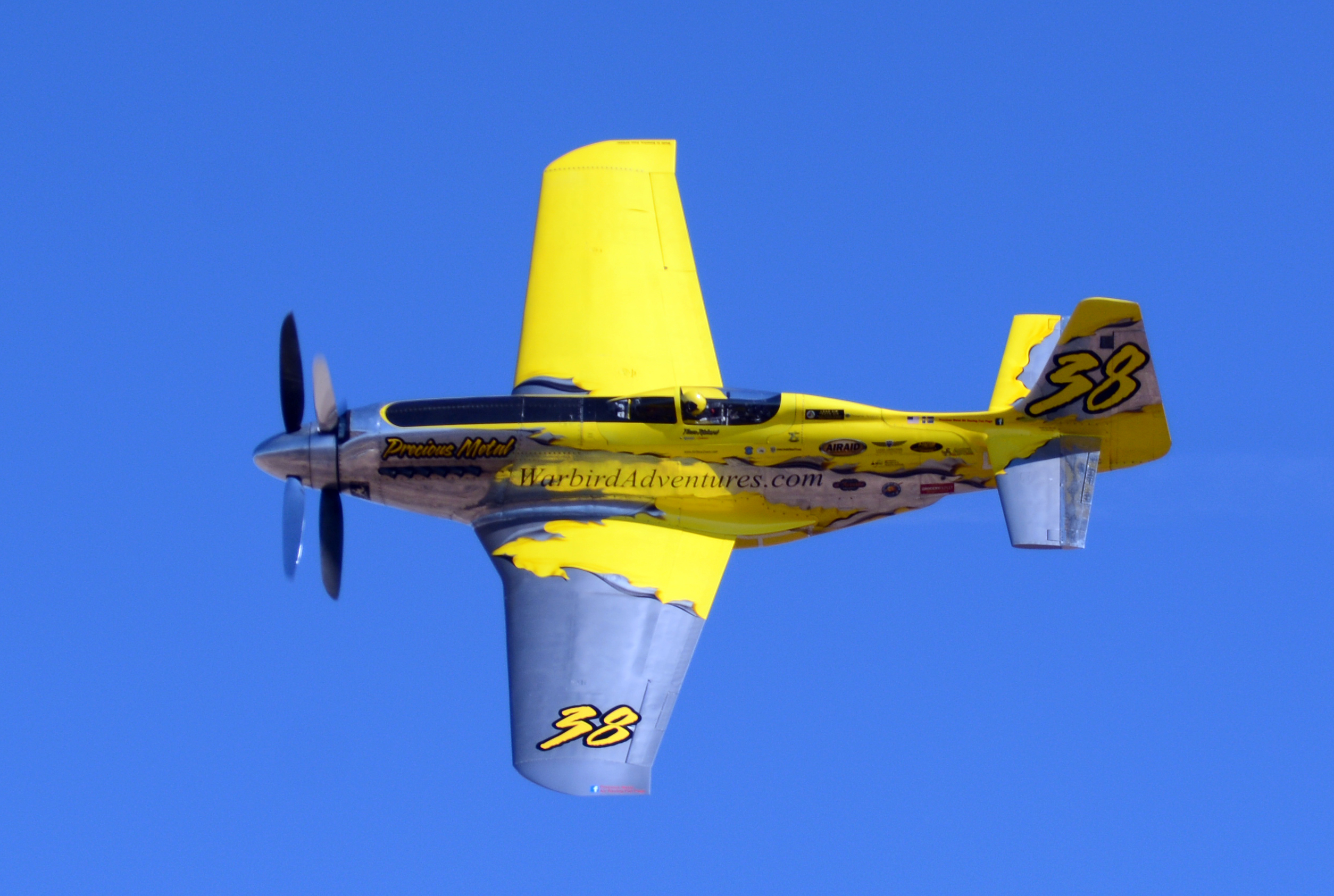
Griffon engine with contra-rotating propellers on the P 51XR Mustang N6WJ "Precious Metal" 2014 Reno Air Races

Note: (Note: Generic types given only, the Griffon was not the main powerplant for some of these aircraft.) (Note: Beaufighter II, Griffon IIB)

- Avro Shackleton
- Blackburn B-54
- Bristol Beaufighter
- CAC CA-15
- Fairey Barracuda
- Fairey Firefly
- Folland Fo.108
- Hawker Fury
- Hawker Henley
- Hawker Tempest Mk III/IV
- Martin-Baker MB 5
- Supermarine Seafang
- Supermarine Seafire
- Supermarine Seagull
- Supermarine Spiteful
- Supermarine Spitfire

=== Racing aircraft ===
Several North American Mustangs raced in the Unlimited Class races at the Reno Air Races have been fitted with Griffons. These include Red Baron (NL7715C), as well as the custom-built P-51XR Precious Metal (N6WJ) and Mustang/Learjet hybrid Miss Ashley II (N57LR). In all cases, Griffons with contra-rotating propellers, taken from Avro Shackleton patrol bombers were used in these aircraft. The RB51 Red Baron is noteworthy for holding the FAI piston-engine 3-kilometre world speed record from 1979 to 1989 499.018 mph (803.1 km/h).

=== Non-aircraft usage ===
The 1980 Miss Budweiser Unlimited Hydroplane dominated the race circuit with a Rolls-Royce Griffon engine. It was the last of the competitive piston-engined boats, before turboshaft powerplants took over.

In modern-day tractor pulling, Griffon engines are also in use, a single or double, rated each at 3,500 hp (2,600 kW).

== Survivors ==
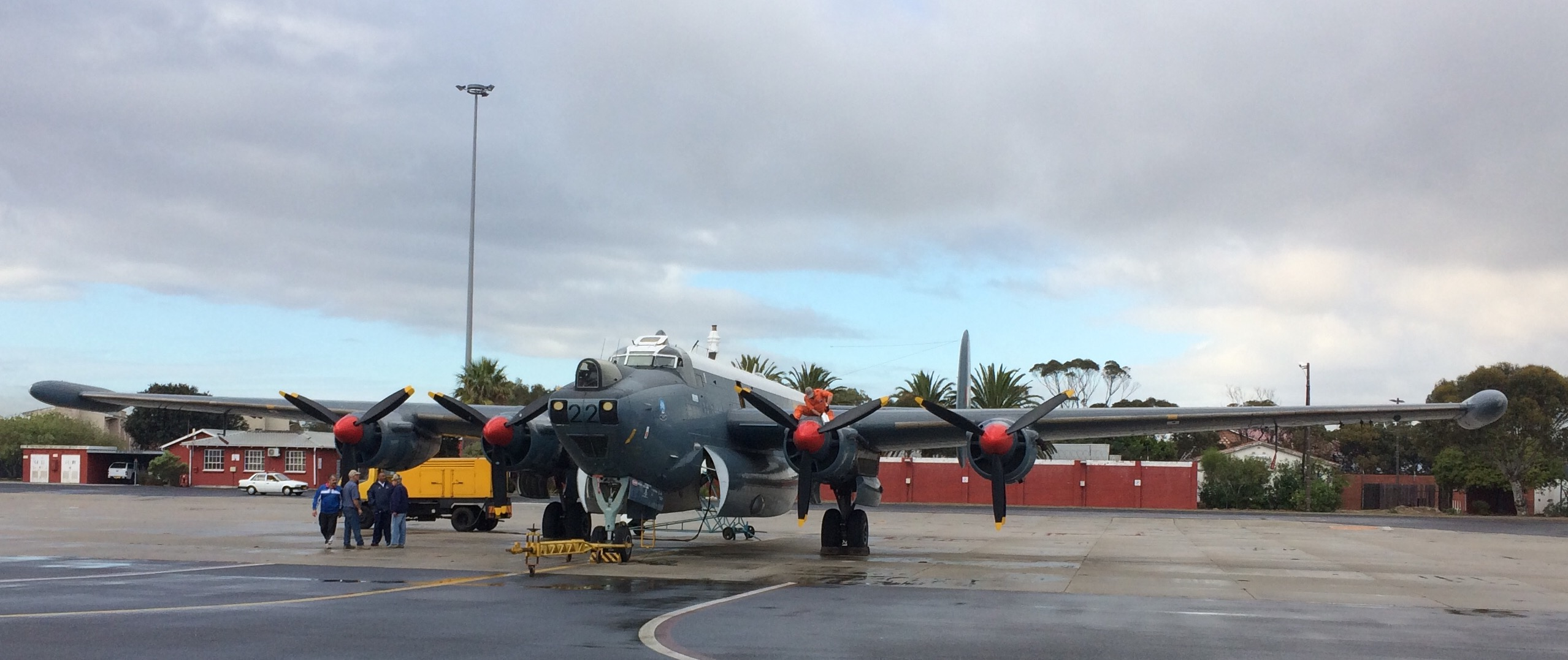
Avro Shackleton Mk 3 at Ysterplaat AFB in South Africa, serial 1722, a.k.a. Pelican 22. Taken 27 May 2017 at engine run-up. No longer flying but considered mostly airworthy.

The Griffon engine continues to be used in restored Fireflies and later mark Spitfires worldwide. The Royal Air Force Battle of Britain Memorial Flight is a notable current operator of the Griffon.

The sole remaining technically airworthy Avro Shackleton is based at the Air Force Base Ysterplaat. However, at least one further airframe is in running condition at the Gatwick Aviation Museum and another is being reassembled to ground running condition at Yorkshire Air Museum.

== Engines on display ==
Preserved Griffon engines are on public display at the:

- Atlantic Canada Aviation Museum
- Birmingham Museum Collection Centre
- Bournemouth Aviation Museum
- Kissimmee Air Museum
- Midland Air Museum
- Rolls-Royce Heritage Trust, Derby
- Royal Air Force Museum London
- Shuttleworth Collection
- South African Air Force Museum, AFB Ysterplaat
- South Yorkshire Aircraft Museum
- Stonehenge Air Museum, Fortine, Montana
- Tangmere Military Aviation Museum

== Specifications (Griffon 65) ==
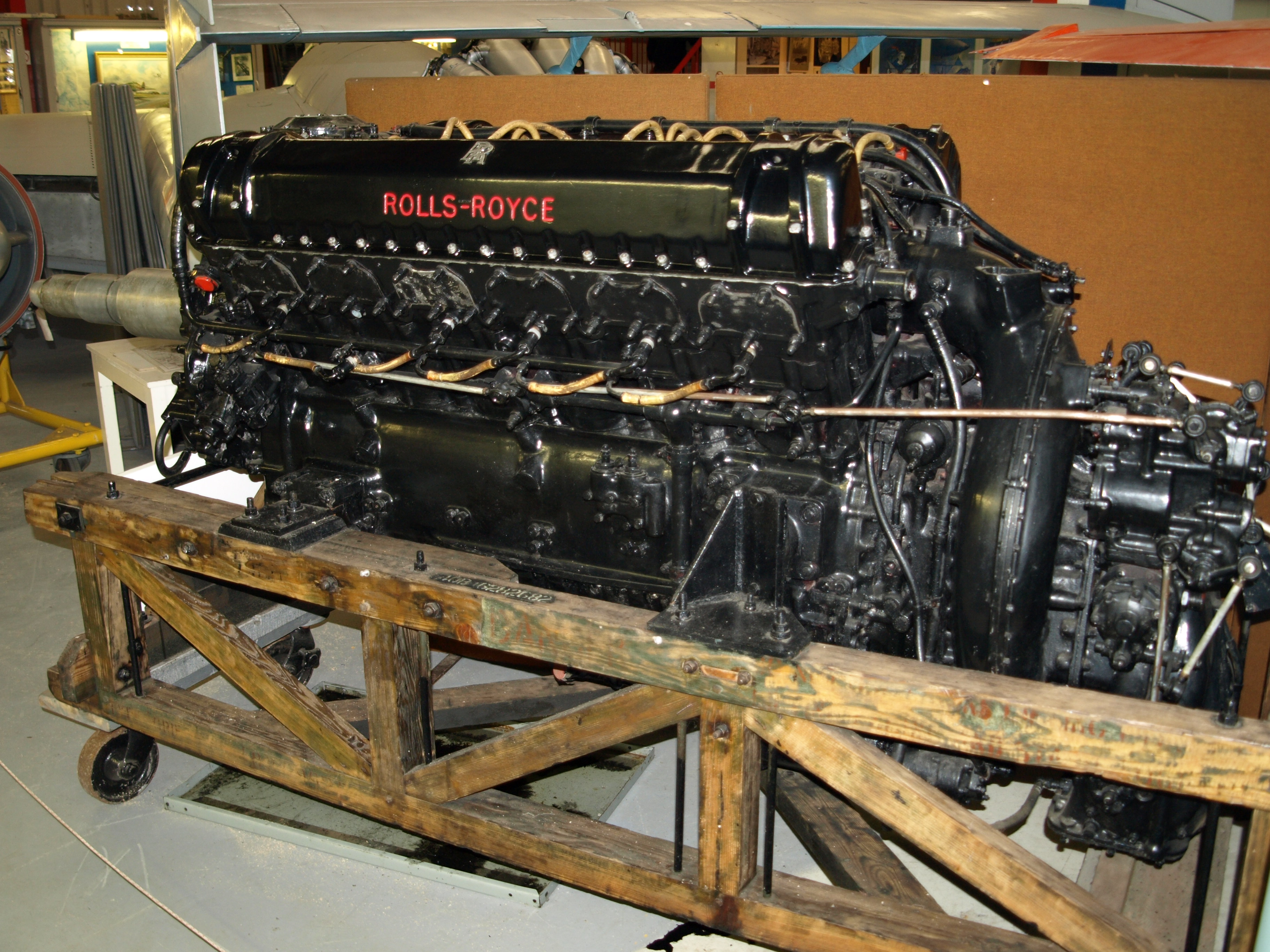
Side view showing supercharger and carburettor detail

Data from Lumsden and The Aeroplane.

=== General characteristics ===
- Type: 12-cylinder supercharged liquid-cooled 60° Vee aircraft piston engine
- Bore: 6 in (152.4 mm)
- Stroke: 6.6 in (167.6 mm)
- Displacement: 2,240 cu in (36.7 L)
- Length: 81 in (205.7 cm)
- Width: 30.3 in (77.0 cm)
- Height: 46 in (116.8 cm)
- Dry weight: 1,980 lb (898 kg)

=== Components ===
- Valvetrain: Two intake and two exhaust valves per cylinder with sodium-cooled exhaust valve stems, actuated via an overhead camshaft.
- Supercharger: Two-speed, two-stage centrifugal type supercharger, boost pressure automatically linked to the throttle, water-air intercooler installed between the second stage and the engine.
- Fuel system: Triple-choke Bendix-Stromberg updraught, pressure-injection carburettor with automatic mixture control
- Fuel type: 100 octane (150 octane January to May 1945)
- Oil system: Dry sump with one pressure pump and two scavenge pumps
- Cooling system: 70% water and 30% ethylene glycol coolant mixture, pressurised. Liquid-cooled Intercooler radiator with its own separate system, again using 70/30% water/glycol mix.
- Reduction gear: 0.51:1, left-hand tractor

=== Performance ===
- Power output:

- 2,035 hp (1,520 kW) at 7,000 ft (2,135 m MS gear), (Note: MS and FS refer to the supercharger blower speeds: Moderate/Fully Supercharged.) +18 psi boost pressure at 2,750 rpm
- 2,220 hp (1,655 kW) at 11,000 ft (3,350 m MS gear), +21 psi at 2,750 rpm using 150 octane fuel
- 1,820 hp (1,360 kW) at 21,000 ft (6,400 m) at 2,750 rpm

- Specific power: 0.91 hp/in^{3} (41.4 kW/L)
- Compression ratio: 6:1
- Power-to-weight ratio: 1.03 hp/lb (1.69 kW/kg)

== See also ==
- Rolls-Royce R
- Rolls-Royce aircraft piston engines

Comparable engines

- Allison V-1710
- Daimler-Benz DB 603
- Daimler-Benz DB 605
- Junkers Jumo 213
- Klimov VK-107
- Mikulin AM-38

Related lists

- List of aircraft engines

== Media ==
Griffon Mk 58
