= Supermarine Seafang =

1940s British fighter aircraft

Seafang
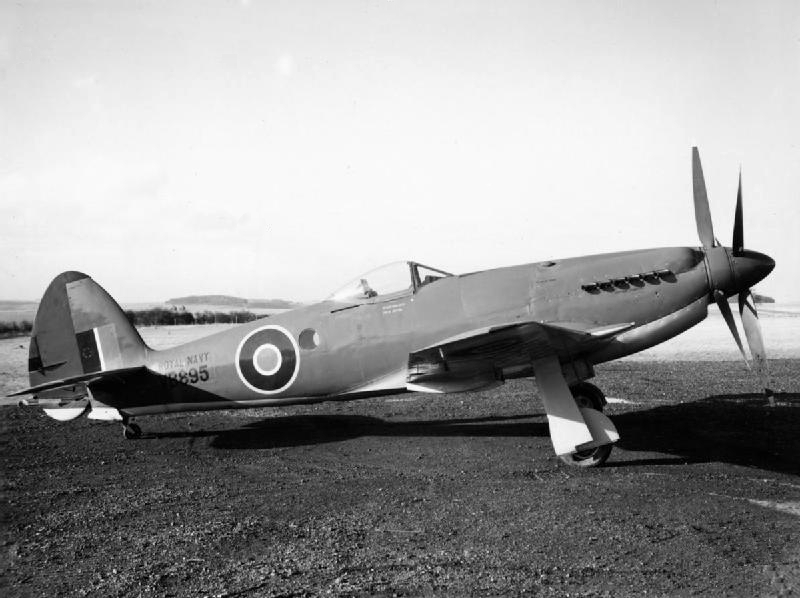
- VB895, the prototype Seafang F.32

General information
- Type: Naval fighter
- National origin: United Kingdom
- Manufacturer: Supermarine
- Primary user: Royal Navy
- Number built: 18

History
- First flight: 1946
- Developed from: Supermarine Spiteful

The Supermarine Seafang was a British Rolls-Royce Griffon–engined naval fighter aircraft designed by Supermarine to Air Ministry specification N.5/45. It was based on the Spiteful, which was a development of Supermarine's Griffon-engined Spitfire. By that time the design of the Spitfire was 10 years old, in a period of rapid technical development in aviation. The Seafang was outmoded by jet aircraft, and only 18 were built.

== Design and development ==
The Seafang was essentially a Spiteful redesigned for Royal Navy carrier use, with the addition of an arrester hook, a contra-rotating propeller to eliminate engine torque effects, and power folding outer wing panels.

Two prototype Type 396 Seafang Mark 32s were ordered on 12 March 1945 followed by an order for 150 Type 382 Seafang Mark 31s on 7 May 1945. To expedite entry into service the interim Mark 31 was ordered which was a navalised Spiteful, basically a Spiteful with an arrestor hook added. This would allow the Mark 32 to be developed; it would be the definitive naval variant, with the folding outer wings and contra-rotating propeller.

The first Seafang flew in 1946; it was the first interim production Mark 31 VG471. Although 150 of the interim variant were ordered, only nine were completed before the order was cancelled as the urgency of an interim type was removed due to the end of the war.

The first prototype Mark 32 VB895 was first flown in June 1946. It was powered by a Griffon 89 engine rated at 2,350 hp (1,750 kW) driving two three-bladed contra-rotating propellers. In August 1946, VB895 was demonstrated to the Royal Netherlands Navy at Valkenburg. The same aircraft was flown by test pilot Mike Lithgow in May 1947 during deck landing trials on HMS Illustrious. Compared to the Seafire F.47, its performance advantage was not deemed to be enough to disrupt series production of new navalised Gloster Meteor and de Havilland Vampire jet fighters. Also, the Seafang's low-speed handling characteristics were not as good as hoped, and the contemporary Hawker Sea Fury was preferred as a fleet fighter.

Seafang Mark 31 VG474 was used as a development aircraft for the Supermarine Attacker jet, receiving power-operated ailerons and contra-rotating propellers. The Attacker was a jet aircraft which used the Spiteful laminar-flow wing and landing gear.

== Variants ==
Type 382 Seafang F Mk.31
Interim production variant with a 2,375 hp Griffon 61 engine, five-bladed constant-speed Rotol airscrew. 150 ordered but only 9 built; the rest were cancelled.
Type 396 Seafang F Mk.32
Two prototypes built powered by a 2,350 hp (1,752 kW) Griffon 89 piston engine, folding wings, increased fuel capacity, dual contra-rotating 3-bladed propellers.

== Operators ==
United Kingdom

- Fleet Air Arm

== Specifications (F Mk.32) ==
Data from The British Fighter since 1912, British Naval Aircraft since 1912

General characteristics

- Crew: 1
- Length: 34 ft 1 in (10.39 m)
- Wingspan: 35 ft 0 in (10.67 m)
- Width: 27 ft (8.2 m) wings folded
- Height: 12 ft 6.5 in (3.823 m)
- Wing area: 210 sq ft (20 m^{2})
- Airfoil: root: Supermarine 371-I; tip: Supermarine 371-II
- Empty weight: 8,000 lb (3,629 kg)
- Gross weight: 10,450 lb (4,740 kg)
- Powerplant: 1 × Rolls-Royce Griffon 89 V-12 liquid-cooled piston engine, 2,350 hp (1,750 kW)
- Propellers: 6-bladed contra-rotating constant-speed propeller

Performance

- Maximum speed: 475 mph (764 km/h, 413 kn) at 21,000 ft (6,400 m)
- Cruise speed: 220 mph (350 km/h, 190 kn) to 240 mph (390 km/h)
- Range: 393 mi (632 km, 342 nmi) at cruise speed
- Service ceiling: 41,000 ft (12,000 m)
- Rate of climb: 4,630 ft/min (23.5 m/s) at 2,000 ft (610 m)
- Wing loading: 49.8 lb/sq ft (243 kg/m^{2})
- Power/mass: 0.188–0.225 hp/lb (0.309–0.370 kW/kg)

Armament

- Guns: 4 × 20 mm (0.787 in) Hispano Mk V cannon
- Rockets: 4 × "60lb" RP-3 rockets
- Bombs: 2 × 1,000 lb (454 kg) bombs
