= Fireflash =

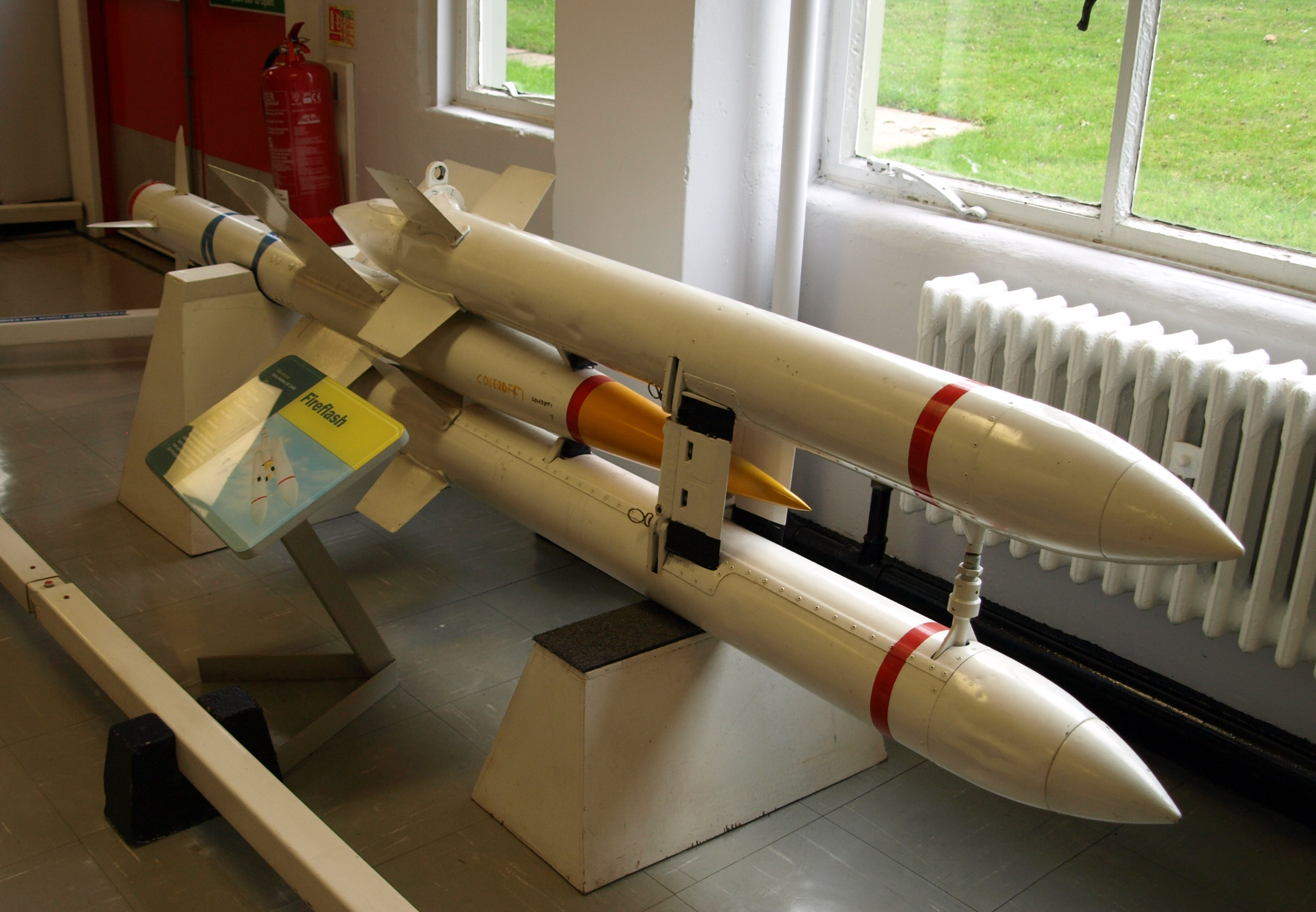
- A Fireflash missile at the Royal Air Force Museum Cosford (2014)
- Type: Air-to-air missile
- Place of origin: United Kingdom

Service history
- In service: 1957–1958
- Used by: United Kingdom
- Wars: None

Production history
- Designed: 1949
- Manufacturer: Fairey Aviation
- No. built: c. 300

Specifications
- Mass: 150 kilograms (330 lb)
- Length: 111.75 inches (2,838 mm)
- Wingspan: 28.11 inches (714 mm)
- Detonation mechanism: Proximity fuze
- Engine: Two solid fuel rocket motors
- Operational range: 1.9 miles (3.1 km)
- Maximum speed: Mach 2
- Guidance system: beam rider
- Steering system: control surfaces
- Launch platform: Aircraft

Fireflash was the United Kingdom's first air-to-air guided missile to see service with the Royal Air Force. Constructed by Fairey Aviation, the missile utilised radar beam riding guidance. Fireflash had relatively limited performance and required the launching aircraft to approach the target from a limited angle astern.

The approximately 300 production Fireflash missiles were mostly expended as a training weapon to familiarize RAF pilots with missile firing. It was declared operational very briefly in 1957, thus becoming the RAF's first operational air-to-air missile, but was quickly replaced by the de Havilland Firestreak the next year.

== Development ==
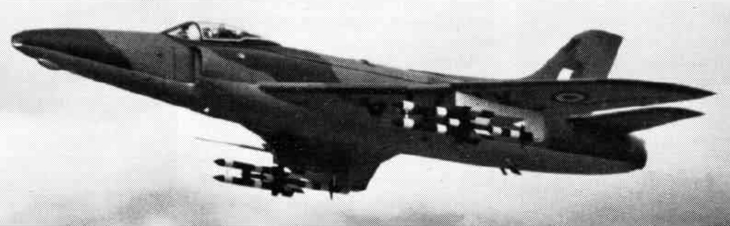
A Supermarine Swift with two Fireflash missiles (1956)

=== Red Hawk ===
In January 1945 the Air Ministry issued Operational Requirement OR.1056, given the Ministry of Supply rainbow code "Red Hawk", for an air-to-air missile. The basic design was based on studies carried out at the Royal Aircraft Establishment (RAE) on earlier weapons. Their experiments with the manually-guided Air Spaniel concept had convinced them that automatic guidance of some sort was required. This led to Artemis semi-active radar homing system, and the larger Little Ben which used beam riding. OR.1056 was overall similar to Little Ben, using beam riding along the AI Mk. IX radar signal as the illumination source.

In 1947, the various ongoing guided weapon projects in the UK were centralized at the RAE. In the immediately following period, a rationalized development program was laid out that called for the development of a surface-to-air missile (SAM) for the Royal Navy that became Seaslug, a similar SAM design for the British Army and Royal Air Force known by the code name "Red Heathen", (Note: Which subsequently diverged into separate Army and RAF projects, Red Shoes and Red Duster respectively.) the Blue Boar anti-shipping bomb, and ongoing development of Red Hawk.

The initial development contract for Red Hawk was released to Gloster Aircraft in October 1947. They developed what was essentially a drone aircraft resembling a small swept-wing fighter, which would be carried in a recessed bay under the aircraft and lowered into the airstream before launch. The RAE was unimpressed, and in late 1947 developed their own design. (Note: Perhaps under the direction of Flt Lt Benson, who had worked on the Spaniel and Artemis projects.) This called for a smaller weapon using four RP-3 motors for boost which were then ejected, leaving the central projectile to coast onward to the target.

=== Pink Hawk and Blue Sky ===
It was soon realized that the all-aspect capability of Red Hawk was beyond the state of the art and a simpler weapon would be needed in the interim. In 1949, the RAE developed a watered-down specification they called "Pink Hawk" that called for a tail-chase attack and was intended to target piston-engined bombers. The Pink Hawk nickname was soon replaced with the official rainbow code, "Blue Sky". The Red Hawk project continued as well, but only briefly before its specifications were relaxed as well; in November 1951 the Air Staff issued OR.1117, given the code "Blue Jay", for an infrared seeking design which became Firestreak.

Fairey Aviation won the contract to develop Blue Sky, which they referred to internally as Project 5. Like the original Little Ben, Project 5 called for a beam riding missile able to be launched from the rear aspect within a 15° cone. Wartime German research suggested that the rocket exhaust would ionize the air behind the missile and make it difficult to receive the radar signal, so Fairey based their design on the original Red Hawk layout using separate boosters that fell away during flight, leaving the signal clear while the unpowered "dart" continued on to the target. In place of the original four RP-3 rockets, two custom-designed "Stork" rockets were used. The two solid-fuel motors were connected to the dart about mid-way along the fuselage. The rocket nozzles were canted slightly to spin the missile assembly on launch, evening out any asymmetries in the thrust. When the boosters are empty, a small cordite charge separates them, leaving the dart to carry on towards the target.

Development of Blue Sky was aided by ongoing projects at Fairey in rocket propulsion that were being used to support the development of the Fairey Delta 2 supersonic aircraft. This involved launching scale models of the proposed design using a locally designed liquid-fuel rocket engine, Beta 2. This also required the development of a complex multi-channel telemetry system that proved invaluable during the development of Blue Sky.

=== Testing and service ===
Fireflash was given its name by the RAF as development continued. It scored its first live-fire success in 1953, successfully destroying a Fairey Firefly drone aircraft flying off RAF Aberporth. In unarmed tests, Fireflash directly hit the drone aircraft, in one case severing its tailwheel.

About 300 missiles had been produced by 1955, but the Royal Air Force soon decided not to retain the type in its inventory as much more advanced designs were on their way. Many of the 300 missiles were expended in testing by No. 6 Joint Services Trials Unit at RAF Valley and Woomera, South Australia from 1955–1957 using Gloster Meteor NF11 (nightfighter) trials aircraft and subsequently by the Supermarine Swift fighters of No. 1 Guided Weapons Development Squadron at RAF Valley.

Fireflash was deployed on a very limited scale by the RAF in August 1957, and "had a limited capability against piston-engine bombers." The RAF deployed the later and more effective de Havilland Firestreak infra-red missile from August 1958.

== Description ==
Drawing of a Fireflash missile

The Fireflash was a beam riding missile - it was designed to fly down a radio beam emitted by the launch aircraft, which the pilot would keep aimed at the target.

It had a very unusual configuration: the missile body was unpowered. It was propelled by a pair of rocket boosters on the forward fuselage that were jettisoned 1.5 seconds after launch. (Note: A cordite charge within a cylinder drove a piston, that sheared the pin that attached each rocket to the missile.) The missile body, now travelling at around Mach 2, would coast the remaining distance to its target under guidance from the launch aircraft (the missile was unguided during the boost phase). (Note: The unusual configuration (an unpowered guided munition that coasts to the target after boosted to high speed by a rocket) was also used decades later in the British Starstreak missile.) The rocket engine nozzles were slightly offset to rotate the missile - this increased accuracy by evening out the effect of any slight asymmetry in thrust.

This configuration drastically limited both range and flight duration, but was used because of fears that ionised particles in the hot, rocket motor exhaust stream would interfere with the guidance radar signals; further development showed the fears were unfounded.

Steering was accomplished by four rudders in a cruciform configuration. These were moved by four pairs of pneumatic servos, operated by solenoid valves. An air bottle, pressurized to 3,000 pounds per square inch (21,000 kPa), supplied air for the servos and also supplied the air that spun the three, air-blown gyroscopes in the missile's inertial navigation system. A high pressure air supply from the aircraft was also required to spin the gyros before the missile was launched.

The purpose of the control system was to keep the missile centred in the guidance beam emitted by the launch aircraft. The pilot of the aircraft would keep the beam aligned with the target using his gunsight, which was harmonized with the axis of the radio beam. An advantage of this system was that it would be unaffected by the target aircraft using radar countermeasures such as chaff. The missile's receiver, fitted at the rear, only detected signals from the launch aircraft.

== Operators ==
United Kingdom

- Royal Air Force

== Survivors ==
Fireflashes are part of the collections of the Royal Air Force Museum Cosford, the Cornwall Aviation Museum at RAF St. Mawgan and (in May 2014) the Combined Military Services Museum at Maldon. A Fireflash unit, missing the tips of the propulsion sections, is in storage at the RAF Hornchurch Heritage Centre.

== See also ==
- Sea Slug missile – a contemporary naval beam-riding missile with wrap-around boosters
- Rainbow Codes
