= Crescent wing =

Aircraft wing configuration

Crescent wing configuration

The crescent wing is a fixed-wing aircraft configuration in which a swept wing has a greater sweep angle on the inboard section than the outboard, giving the wing a crescent shape.

The planform attempts to reduce several unpleasant side-effects of the swept wing design, notably its tendency to "pitch-up", sometimes violently, when it nears a stall.

== Basic concept ==
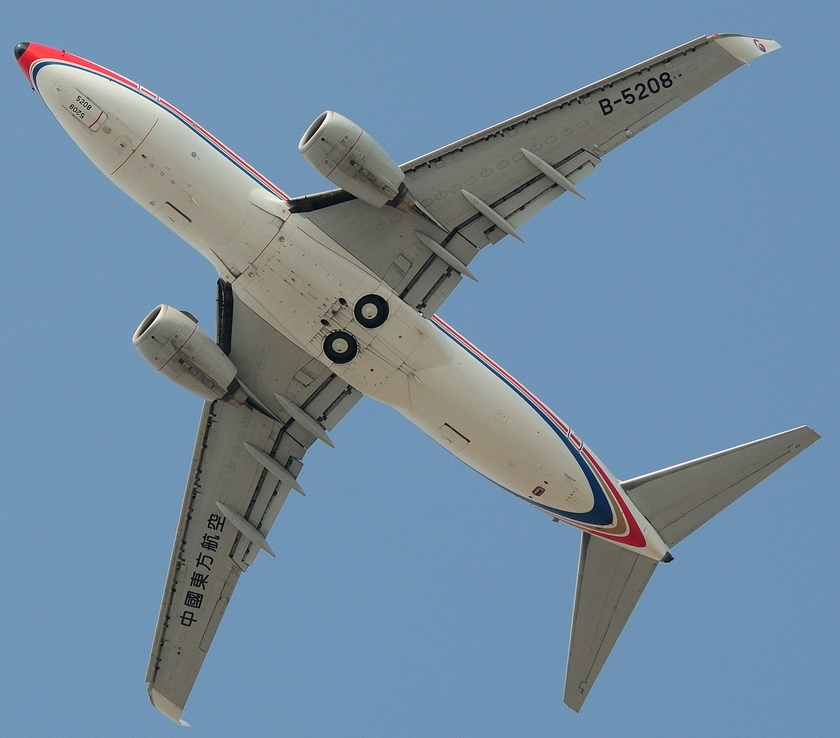
Some jet aircraft have a degree of crescent shaping, like the inboard section of the Boeing 737.

As an aircraft enters the transonic region close to the speed of sound, the acceleration of air over curved areas can cause the flow to go supersonic. This generates a shock wave and creates considerable drag, known as wave drag. The increase in drag is so rapid and powerful that it gives rise to the concept of a sound barrier.

The speed at which this effect becomes noticeable, known as critical mach, is based on the rate of curvature on the upper and lower surfaces; airfoils with greater curvature will have a lower critical Mach speed and thus suffer more heavily from wave drag. A wing designed for good transonic and supersonic performance should spread the curvature of the wing over a longer distance. This naturally leads to thin, long-chord, low aspect-ratio designs like the wing on the Lockheed F-104 Starfighter. Such designs suffer from much greater induced drag, making them less efficient at slower speeds. They also have practical drawbacks, notably a lack of room for fuel and storage of the landing gear.

Swept wings are a way to lower the amount of effective curvature of a wing without having a longer physical chord. Instead of meeting the leading edge curvature directly, the sweep of the wing lengthens the path of the airflow over the wing by the sine of the sweep angle, increasing the effective chord. This allows a thicker wing to have the same critical Mach as a thinner unswept design. Most transonic designs use sweep for this reason, allowing them to use a wing that is thick enough for practical internal storage without incurring a heavy wave drag penalty.

In real-world designs, the wing root, where the wing meets the fuselage, is thicker than the wing tip. This is because the wing spar has to support the forces from the entire wing outboard, meaning there is very little force on the spar at the tip, but the lift force of the entire wing at the root. Spars generally get much larger as they approach the root to account for these forces, and streamlining the wing profile around such designs generally requires the wing to be much thicker and be more heavily curved at the root than the tip.

If one desires to keep the critical Mach number close to constant on such a design, the thinner outboard sections of the wing should have less sweep than the thicker root. Shaping a wing to incorporate a constant critical Mach along the span naturally gives it the crescent shape. The design has two added advantages, which are related to each other. The combination of these effects allows the crescent wing to have better handling characteristics across a wider range of speeds.

When air flows over a swept wing, it encounters a force towards the wing tip. At high speeds, this force is too small to have an effect before the air is past the wing. At lower speeds, this sideways motion becomes more evident, and as the sideways motion pushes on the air outboard of it, this spanwise flow becomes more and more noticeable towards the wing tips. At very low speeds, the flow can become so sideways that the front-to-back flow, which is what gives rise to lift, is no longer above the stall speed of the airfoil, and the wing tips may stall. Because the sweep means the tips are behind the center of gravity, this loss of lift at the rear of the aircraft causes a nose-up force, which may cause further stalling. A dangerous runaway effect may occur, known as pitch up.

A crescent wing reduces this problem. Since the sweep angle at the tip is less than at the root, the sideways force is reduced. When considered over the entire width of the wing, this can greatly reduce the spanwise flow, and thereby lower the speeds where the tips stall. Moreover, even when the wing tips do stall, they are located more forward than they would be in the case of a straight swept wing. This means the loss of lift occurs closer to the center of gravity, and thereby reduces the magnitude of the pitching forces.

At the opposite end of the speed range, another effect comes into play. As a wing is loaded, it bends upward. In the case of a swept wing, because these loads are rear of the mean chord, this upward force becomes a torque around the spar, causing the tips to rotate tips-down. This lowers the amount of lift at the tips as they become flatter to the airflow, or "wash out". This causes the same nose-up force as the low-speed case, and at high speeds, the forces involved can be very high and lead to structural problems. Again, as the crescent wing's tips are closer to the center of pressure, these forces are reduced.

Ailerons, located at the wing tips, also create a large torque force when actuated. This can cause a problem known as aileron reversal, where the twisting motion of the entire wing causes the opposite force to be applied. This problem was well known on the Supermarine Spitfire and required its wing to be greatly strengthened to counteract this effect. In the case of a crescent wing, this effect is no more or less pronounced than on other designs. However, it does set a minimum torsional strength requirement which may be higher than would otherwise be needed due to the crescent shape's lowering of the maneuvering loads, thus potentially offsetting this advantage.

The self-flaring capability, often mentioned in discussions of the Handley Page Victor, is not inherent to the crescent wing, but may occur on any high-tailed aircraft with some wing sweep. This effect is caused by the fact that the wing enters the ground effect before the tail, which is mounted high in the T-tail case. This creates a brief period of added lift on the wing that is not countered by the tail, causing the nose to rise. This rotation stops as soon as the aircraft descends low enough that the tail begins to enter the ground effect as well.

== History ==
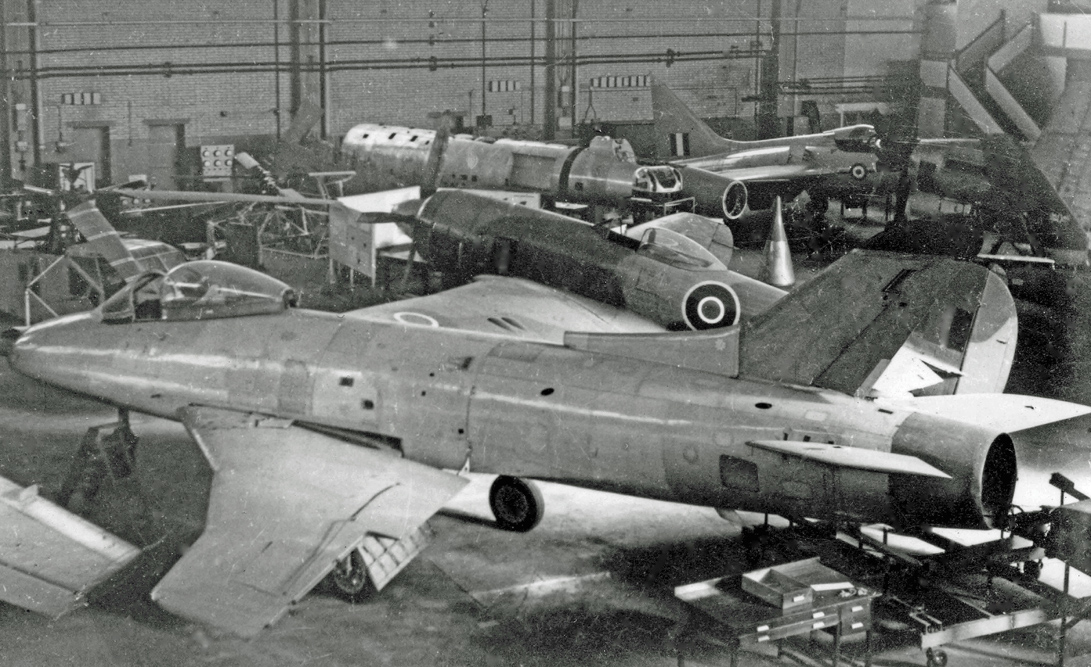
The Supermarine 545 had a three-stage sweep in its crescent wing. It was not put into production.

The crescent wing planform was invented by the German aerodynamicist Dipl.-Ing. Rüdiger Kosin and Walther Lehmann, while working for Arado Flugzeugwerke Gmbh during the Second World War. A prototype wing was constructed by April 1945, with the intention of fitting it to the Arado Ar 234 V16 prototype airframe. However, before it could be fitted, the British Army overran the site and the wing was destroyed.

Design staff from the British aircraft manufacturer Handley Page - amongst whose staff was engineer Gustav Lachmann - were sent to Germany, where they were impressed by the work at Arado. They subsequently incorporated the configuration in their proposal for the HP.80 V-bomber, later to be named the Victor.

Handley Page proposed a one-third scale research glider, the HP.87, but soon abandoned it in favour of a powered research aircraft, the HP.88 having a 0.36-scale wing. The HP.88 first flew on 21 June 1951. During its brief career it showed a tendency to pitching oscillations and, on 26 August 1951, this was observed to occur increasingly violently before the aircraft broke up in the air.

By then the Victor design was already well advanced, with the first prototype flying on 24 December 1952 and production examples entering service in April 1958. The problem seen on the HP.88 was ultimately traced to a servomechanism on the tail controls, not a problem inherent to the layout of the bomber.

Meanwhile, in France, Bréguet proposed the Br.978A design for a crescent-winged airliner, which they referred to as the "croissant". The design was not built. The layout was also selected for the Supermarine 545, a supersonic version of the Supermarine Swift, but this was not put into production.

== Handley Page Victor ==
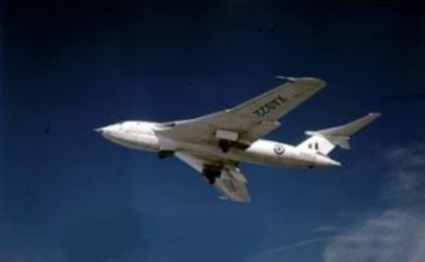
A Victor B.1 showing its crescent wing

The Victor was the only crescent-wing type to enter production. It served with the Royal Air Force for many years, serving in a variety of roles besides bomber, including as an inflight refuelling tanker during the Falklands War.

The profile and shaping of the crescent wing was subject to considerable fine-tuning and alterations throughout the early development stages, particularly to counter unfavourable pitching behavior in flight.

During the flight tests of the first prototype, the Victor proved its aerodynamic performance, flying up to Mach 0.98 without handling or buffeting problems; there were next to no aerodynamic changes between prototype and production aircraft. Production aircraft featured an automated nose-flap operation to counteract a tendency for the aircraft to pitch upwards during low-to-moderate Mach numbers. One unusual flight characteristic of the early Victor was its self-landing capability; once lined up with the runway, the aircraft would naturally flare as the wing entered into ground effect while the tail continued to sink, giving a cushioned landing without any command or intervention by the pilot.

The Victor had good handling and excellent performance, along with favourable slow speed flight characteristics and has been described as an agile aircraft, atypical for a large bomber aircraft; in 1958, a Victor had performed several loops and a barrel roll during practices for a display flight at Farnborough Airshow.

The Victor was designed for flight at high subsonic speeds, although multiple instances have occurred in which the sound barrier was broken.
