= Supermarine Seagull =

Supermarine Seagull may refer to one of the following types of amphibious aircraft produced by the British aircraft company Supermarine:

- Supermarine Seagull (1921), amphibian flying boat
- Supermarine Seagull V, the original name for the Supermarine Walrus, and a name retained by the Royal Australian Air Force
- Supermarine Seagull (1948), Supermarine's last military flying boat
