= ASR-1 =

ASR-1 or ASR 1 may refer to:

- Supermarine Seagull (1948), a seaplane, also known as the "Seagull ASR-1", built by the British company Supermarine
- USS Widgeon (AM-22), a United States Navy minesweeper, which saw service during World War I and was later converted to a Submarine Rescue Ship, ASR-1
