= Handley Page HP.88 =

British research aircraft

General information
- Type: Research aircraft
- Manufacturer: Blackburn Aircraft Limited
- Status: Destroyed
- Number built: 1

History
- First flight: 21 June 1951
- Developed from: Supermarine Attacker

The Handley Page HP.88 was a British research aircraft, built in the early 1950s for Handley Page to test the aerodynamics of the Victor crescent wing design, and was intended to be a scaled-down version of that aircraft.

== Development ==
The single HP.88 aircraft was designed to Air Ministry Specification E.6/48, issued on 12 March 1948, for an aerodynamic testbed for the proposed Handley Page Victor V-bomber, and in particular the crescent wing to be used by Handley Page's jet bomber.

To save time and cost it was decided to base the fuselage on the Supermarine Attacker. In the event, the many changes led Supermarine to give the design its own designation as the Supermarine 521. Detail design was contracted to General Aircraft (GAL) at Hanworth Aerodrome, but after GAL merged with Blackburn the work was moved to Brough Aerodrome and the design was given the Blackburn/SBAC designation YB-2. The aircraft was allocated military serial VX330.

The HP.88 had a 0.36 scaled-down equivalent of the Victor's crescent wing and T-tail with slab tailplane. However where the Victor had a mid wing, the Type 521 set the wing low on the fuselage. Also, the Victor design continued to be refined, so the HP.88 was no longer representative of the Victor. The HP.88 wing featured inboard trailing-edge flaps, which badly affected trim when deployed. The tailplane was too small to counter the trim change, so a system was developed where the ailerons deflected upwards together to balance the trim forces. The system was wholly automatic with no pilot intervention, and in the event of any failure all surfaces would return to their normal positions. Uprigging the ailerons was a technique used during flutter testing on the second prototype Victor. The fin flutter speed was critically dependent on the steady airload on the tailplane. With both ailerons rigged in the up position the pressure distribution around the wing was altered and hence the trim load required from the tailplane.

The Supermarine fuselage was delivered to the Blackburn factory at Brough, where it was modified and the wing fitted. The completed HP.88 was taken by road to Carnaby near Bridlington, where it was flown for the first time on 21 June 1951. Testing by Blackburn revealed pitching oscillations at speeds above 230 knots. Modifications to the tailplane gave acceptable behaviour, with only minor oscillation, up to 450 knots (Mach 0.82). The HP.88 was delivered to Handley Page and on 6 August 1951 was flown to Stansted for further testing.

On 26 August 1951, in preparation for the 1951 SBAC Air Display at Farnborough, the HP.88 carried out a high-speed pass at 300 ft over Stansted, and was seen to start a pitching oscillation before breaking up in mid-air. The "black box" flight recorder subsequently showed pitching accelerations of +/-12g. The cause was traced to a tailplane control system servo instability involving a bob-weight that had been added as a safety measure. The HP.88 had only flown 14 hours in 26 sorties over a lifetime of just 36 days, and had little time to gather useful information, but the loss of the aircraft was of little significance to the V bomber project; two prototype Victors were already nearing completion by the time of the HP.88's first flight.

== Specifications (HP.88) ==
Data from Jane's Pocket Book of Research and Experimental Aircraft

General characteristics

- Crew: 1
- Length: 40 ft (12 m)
- Wingspan: 40 ft (12 m)
- Wing area: 284 sq ft (26.4 m^{2})
- Airfoil: root: 16% Modified RAE Airfoil; tip: 6% Modified RAE Airfoil
- Empty weight: 11,630 lb (5,275 kg)
- Gross weight: 14,640 lb (6,641 kg)
- Powerplant: 1 × Rolls-Royce Nene 102 centrifugal-flow turbojet engine, 4,770 lbf (21.2 kN) thrust

Performance

- Maximum speed: Mach 0.9
- Thrust/weight: 0.3

== See also ==
- Avro 707

Related development

- Handley Page Victor
