= Supermarine Attacker =

Carrier-based fighter aircraft; first jet fighter in Royal Navy service

Attacker
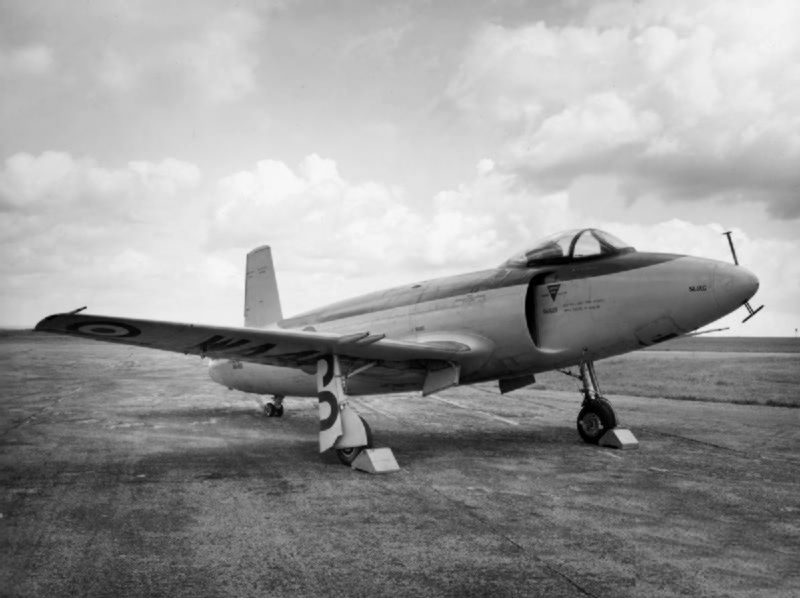

General information
- Type: Naval fighter
- National origin: United Kingdom
- Manufacturer: Supermarine
- Primary users: Royal Navy Royal Naval Volunteer Reserve; Pakistan Air Force
- Number built: 182 + 3 prototypes

History
- Introduction date: August 1950
- First flight: 27 July 1946
- Retired: FAA: 1954; RNVR: 1957; PAF: 1964
- Developed from: Supermarine Spiteful
- Developed into: Supermarine Type 510

The Supermarine Attacker is a British single-seat naval jet fighter designed and produced by aircraft manufacturer Supermarine for the Royal Navy's Fleet Air Arm (FAA). It was the first jet fighter to enter operational service with the FAA.

In order to rapidly introduce jet aircraft to Navy service, Supermarine proposed using the wing developed for their most advanced piston-powered design, the Supermarine Spiteful, with a new fuselage for the Rolls-Royce Nene engine. Performing its maiden flight on 27 July 1946, the flight testing phase of development was protracted due to several issues, including handling difficulties. The first Attackers were introduced to FAA service in August 1951.

Common to the majority of other first-generation jet fighters, the Attacker had a relatively short service life before being replaced. This was due to increasingly advanced aircraft harnessing the jet engine, being developed during the 1950s and 1960s. Despite its retirement from front line service by the FAA during 1954, only three years following its introduction, the Attacker would be adopted by the newly formed Pakistan Air Force, who would continue to operate the type possibly as late as 1964.

== Development ==
=== Origins ===
The origins of the Attacker can be traced back to a wartime fighter jet project requested under Specification E.10/44 (the E standing for experimental) issued by the Air Ministry during 1944, which had called for the development of a jet fighter furnished with a laminar flow wing and a single jet engine. In response, British aircraft manufacturer Supermarine produced their submission, which involved designing a brand new fuselage, complete with bifurcated intakes to provide airflow to the Rolls-Royce Nene turbojet engine powering the type. This fuselage was mated with the pre-existing laminar flow straight wings which had been designed for the Supermarine Spiteful, a piston-engined fighter that had been intended to replace the Supermarine Spitfire.

Joe Smith presented the Type 392 for consideration and three prototypes (TS409, TS413 and TS416) were ordered. Prior to the design being officially named Attacker, the aircraft had was referred to as the "Jet Spiteful" with "Jet Seafang" for a naval version.

E.10/44 (issued February 1945) specified a maximum speed of 550 mph (885 km/h) up to 30,000 ft (9,100 m).

As originally intended, the Type 392 was supposed to provide an interim jet fighter to equip the Royal Air Force (RAF) while another aircraft, the Gloster E.1/44, that was also powered by the same Rolls-Royce Nene engine, completed development; (Note: The E.1/44 was low priority and there was a lack of enthusiasm within Gloster for the project. Gloster's design was being built in two forms - one with de Havilland Ghost and one with the Nene. The production order to F.23/46 of September 1945 was later cancelled.) the expectation was that, with the wing already designed, the remaining work required for the aircraft would be completed quickly. On 30 August 1944, an order for three prototypes was placed with Supermarine; it was stipulated that the second and third prototypes were both to be navalised. On 7 July 1945, a follow-on order for 24 pre-production aircraft, six for the RAF and the remaining 18 (to Specification E1/45) for the Fleet Air Arm (FAA), was placed.

Handling problems with the Spiteful prototype delayed progress on the jet-powered version, leading to the pre-production order of 24 being stopped, although work on the three prototypes continued. In January 1945 Supermarine had been ordered to stop work on their Seagull air-sea rescue amphibian and give the Type 392 maximum priority. Due to the delay, the FAA instead ordered a batch of 18 de Havilland Vampire Mk. 20s for the purpose of gaining experience with jet aircraft. After evaluating both the Jet Spiteful and the E.1/44, the RAF decided to reject both designs since neither aircraft offered any perceptible performance advantage over contemporary fighters such as the Gloster Meteor and the de Havilland Vampire, which were the RAF's first two operational jet aircraft.

=== Into flight ===
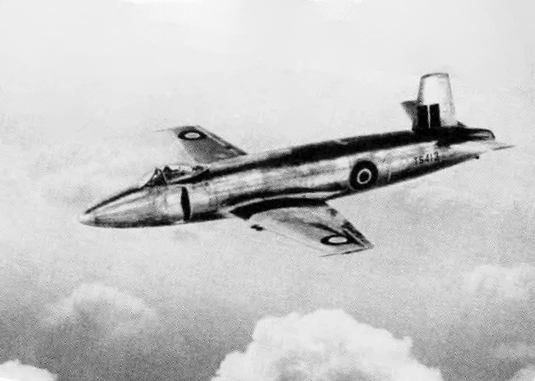
The second Type 398 Attacker (TS413) in flight, 1947

Following the design's rejection by the RAF, Supermarine decided to approach the Admiralty with an offer of developing a navalised version of the project. On 27 July 1946, the maiden flight of the type was performed by prototype Type 392 serial number TS409, a land-based version, by test pilot Jeffrey Quill. The Air Ministry issued Specification E.1/45 to cover production aircraft; meeting its various requirements necessitated a range of extensive modifications to be made to the design, including a revised fin and tailplane arrangement, as well as an increased internal fuel capacity. Accordingly, a large external ventral fuel tank was adopted, along with an extended dorsal fin and folding wing tips.

Flight testing was largely conducted at Supermarine's newly created experimental establishment at the former RAF Chilbolton. The Attacker had several deficiencies, one of which was using the Spiteful tail-wheel undercarriage rather than a nose-wheel undercarriage, a configuration that resulted in the Attacker being considerably more difficult to land on an aircraft carrier. According to aviation author Bill Gunston, this tail-dragger undercarriage meant that, when operating from grass airfields, the jet exhaust would create a long furrow in the ground that "three men could lie down in". However, according to aviation periodical Flight, claims of scorched or ploughed surfaces, even grass, were exaggerated. The Attacker was neither the only nor the first jet aircraft to be equipped with such an undercarriage, which was also used on the experimental Heinkel He 178 and several early Messerschmitt Me 262 aircraft. The chief designer at Vickers-Supermarine, Mr. Joseph Smith, claimed that testing had validated the performance of the tail-dragger undercarriage as acceptable.

On 17 June 1947, the first navalised prototype, Type 398 TS413, conducted its first flight, flown by test pilot Mike Lithgow; occurring four years after the Meteor had performed its first flight. During November 1949, production orders on behalf of the FAA were received by Supermarine. On 5 May 1950, the first production variant of the aircraft, designated Attacker F.1, performed its first flight; one year later, deliveries of the type commenced.

== Design ==
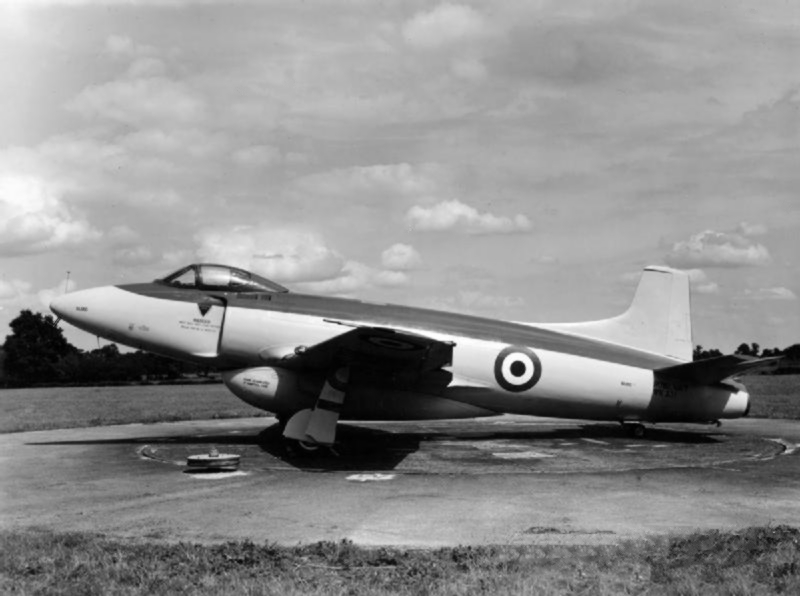
An Attacker FB2 on the ground, August 1952

For a jet aircraft, the Attacker's design was unusual, with a tail-dragger undercarriage with twin tailwheels, as well as an unswept wing. The flight controls were relatively conventional, based on those of the Spiteful. The forward position of the cockpit was well-received, and provided an exceptionally good view for the pilot.

The Attacker had a relatively strong structure, making extensive use of heavy-gauge materials, principally aluminium alloy, which were used with stressed-skin construction and supported by 24 closely spaced stringers and formers. The nose had an unusual lobster-claw structure, comprising thick laminated aluminium-alloy sheet at the top and bottom, with no stiffening members; it gave armour protection to the pilot and carried pressurisation loads. The tip of the nose was detachable to accommodate a gun camera or ballast; between this and the cockpit was an avionics bay. Aft of the cockpit was the semi-monocoque fuel tank, followed by the engine bay.

In terms of its aerodynamics, the Attacker was well streamlined, described by Flight in 1947 as being "perhaps more perfect than any other fighter". The fuselage was continuously curved with no straight lines. It was shaped to have some of the wing's laminar flow characteristics and its lines were interrupted only by the faired cockpit canopy and the engine air intakes on either side of the cockpit. The intakes diverted the front fuselage boundary layer to prevent it entering the engine; tests with the diverters faired-over gave reduced engine performance including thrust.

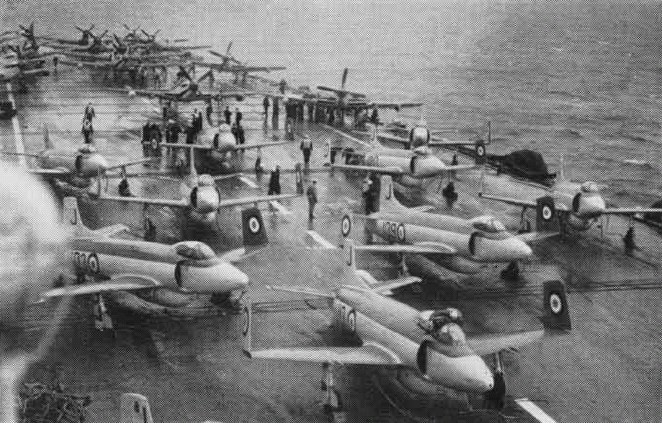
Flight deck of the Royal Navy aircraft carrier HMS Eagle; multiple Attacker FB.2 fighters are in the foreground; in the background are Fairey Firefly FR.4s, circa 1953

The design of the wing was largely unchanged from the Spiteful, save for being slightly enlarged to match the bigger Attacker. It used split flaps along the trailing edge, as well as slotted ailerons and electrically operated trim tabs. With a single main spar and one auxiliary spar, the wing was bolted directly onto stub spar booms as there was no centre-section. The exterior skins were flush-riveted and manufactured with considerable care in an attempt to achieve the laminar flow predicted from wind tunnel tests. Flight attributed the laminar-flow wing to enabling the Attacker to exceed the maximum speed of the Spiteful by more than 100 mph. However, other reports claim that the Attacker's wing was aerodynamically inferior to the original elliptical wing of the Spitfire, possessing unfavourable characteristics such as a lower critical Mach number.

The Attacker was powered by a single Rolls-Royce Nene Mk. 101 turbojet engine; at the time, the Nene was the most powerful jet engine in the world, with a thrust of 5,000 lb. The engine was supported by a heavy box-section rear spar frame, which was braced fore and aft to the main spar. As the jet-pipe was relatively long, a manually operated variable exhaust outlet was used during engine starting to prevent jet-pipe resonances and excessive turbine temperatures. The exterior skin surrounding the intake had several louvres to regulate pressures during starting; they automatically closed to seal the engine bay after starting. The engine bay incorporated a pilot-operated fire extinguisher system. Although an automatic fuel transfer system was not originally incorporated, experience with the initial prototypes led to its incorporation.

In terms of armament, the Attacker F.1 had four 20 mm (.79 in) Hispano Mk. V cannon; at the time, this was viewed as the standard armament for a frontline RAF fighter. These cannon were fired using electronically operated Maxifiux-Star units. The inboard cannon had a maximum capacity of 167 rounds of ammunition each, while the outboard cannon had up to 145 rounds each. External stores included two 1,000 lb bombs or four 300 lb rockets.

== Operational history ==
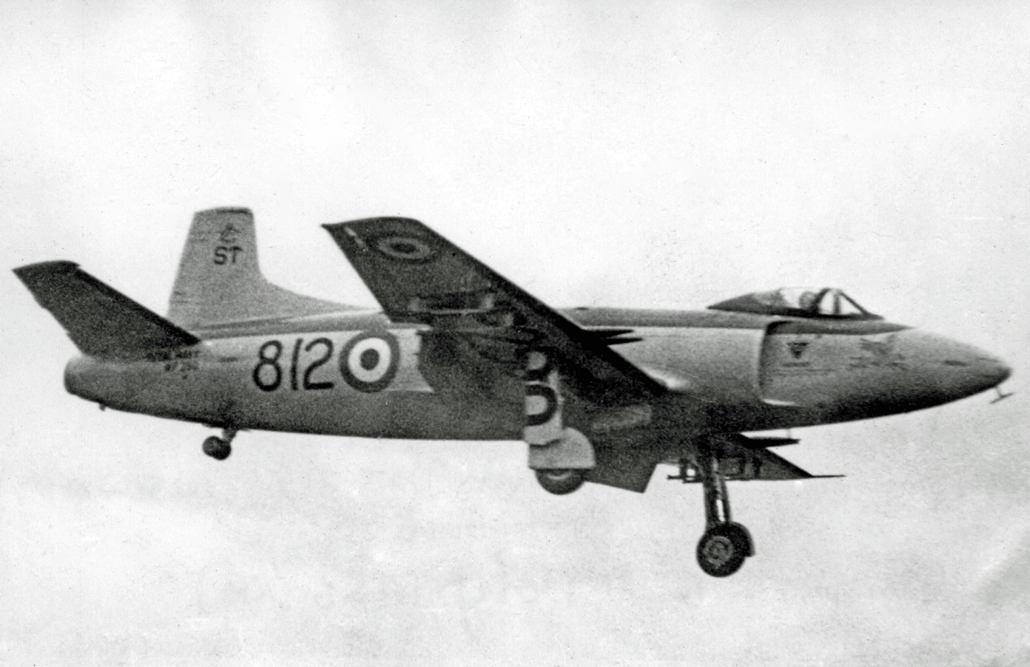
Attacker FB.2 of 1831 Squadron RNVR landing at RNAS Stretton in 1956

=== Britain ===
During August 1951, the Attacker entered operational service with the FAA; the first squadron to receive production aircraft was 800 Naval Air Squadron, based at RNAS Ford. Following the introduction of the Attacker F.1, two further variants of the aircraft were developed and produced for the FAA. The Attacker FB.1 was a fighter-bomber that differed little from the original F.1 model, except that it was expected to operate as a ground attack aircraft. The third, and last, variant was the Attacker FB.2, which was powered by a more capable model of the Nene engine that was accompanied by various modifications to its structure. On this model, the Supermarine Attacker was furnished with a total of eight underwing hard points, which could carry a pair of 1,000 lb (454 kg) bombs or a maximum of eight unguided rockets.

A total of 146 production Attackers would be delivered to the FAA. It had a relatively brief career with the FAA, none of its variants seeing any action during the type's service life with the FAA and being taken out of first-line service during 1954. The type had been replaced in front line squadrons by multiple more capable jet-propelled fighters, including the Hawker Sea Hawk and de Havilland Sea Venom. For several further years, the Attacker remained in service with squadrons of the Royal Naval Volunteer Reserve (RNVR), the type being finally taken out of reserve service during early 1957.

=== Pakistan ===
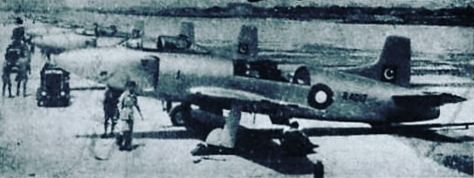
Pakistani Supermarine Attackers

During the early 1950s, the Royal Pakistan Air Force (RPAF) sought to acquire its first-ever jet-powered aircraft. A combination of a lack of funds and political pressure that was exerted by British suppliers persuaded the service to acquire a variant of the Attacker known as the Type 538, which was essentially a "de-navalised" variant of the aircraft used by the FAA.

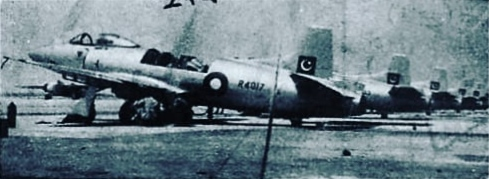
Supermarine Attackers of the No. 11 Squadron of Pakistan Air Force

Pakistan received its first Attackers in 1951, with deliveries eventually reaching 36 units. Only a single squadron was ever equipped with these aircraft, an interceptor unit, the No. 11 Squadron, with the Attackers also equipping the PAF's first aerial display team, the "Paybills". No. 11 Squadron's Attackers remained operational for seven years with the last examples withdrawn from service in 1956 when they were replaced with the North American F-86F Sabres. Officially, the Attacker remained in Pakistani service until 1958, although some sources claim the aircraft were still being used as late as 1964.

== Variants ==
Type 392
Prototype land version to specification E.10/44, ordered as one of three prototypes on 30 August 1944, one built and first flown 27 July 1946.
Type 398
Prototype navalised variant ordered on 30 August 1944, one built and first flown 17 June 1947.
Type 510
Prototype with swept wings and tail whose development led to the Supermarine Swift.
Type 513
Prototype second naval prototype to specification E.1/45 ordered on 30 August 1943, one built and first flown 24 January 1950.
Type 398 Attacker F.1
Production Nene 3 powered variant, 63 ordered on 29 October 1948 and built at South Marston, 50 built as F1 as two were cancelled and the last 11 built as FB.1s. First flight of production F.1 was on 4 April 1950.
Attacker FB.1
Last 11 production F 1s were built as FB 1s plus an additional aircraft ordered on 27 March 1950 to replace one aircraft destroyed on a production test flight. The FB1 had been modified from the original design to allow it to carry rocket projectiles or bombs under the wings.
Attacker FB.2
Updated fighter-bomber variant powered by the Nene 102, 24 ordered on 21 November 1950, 30 ordered on 16 February 1950 and a further 30 ordered on 7 September 1950, all 84 built at South Marston.
Type 538 Attacker FB.50
Land based fighter-bomber variant powered by the Rolls-Royce Nene 4, made specifically for export to the Royal Pakistan Air Force, 36 built with the first delivered in 1953.

== Operators ==
Pakistan

- Pakistan Air Force, 36 FB.50 from 1951 to 1958
  - No. 11 Squadron Arrows 1951-1956
  - Paybills aerobatic team 1952-1958

United Kingdom

- Fleet Air Arm, 146 aircraft.
  - 700 Naval Air Squadron - FB.2 (1955-56)
  - 702 Naval Air Squadron - F.1 (1952)
  - 703 Naval Air Squadron - F.1, FB.1 & FB.2 (1951 & 1952 & 55)
  - 718 Naval Air Squadron - FB.2 (1955)
  - 736 Naval Air Squadron - F.1 (1952-54)
  - 767 Naval Air Squadron - F.1, FB.1 & FB.2 (1953-54)
  - 787 Naval Air Squadron - F.1, FB.1 & FB.2 (1951-54)
  - 800 Naval Air Squadron - F.1, FB.1 & FB.2 (1951-54)
  - 803 Naval Air Squadron - F.1, FB.1 & FB.2 (1951-54)
  - 890 Naval Air Squadron - F.1, FB.1 & FB.2 (1952)
- Royal Naval Volunteer Reserve
  - 1831 Naval Air Squadron - FB.2 (1955-57)
  - 1832 Naval Air Squadron - FB.2 (1955-56) (Pooled aircraft)
  - 1833 Naval Air Squadron - FB.2 (1955-57)
  - 1835 Naval Air Squadron - FB.2 (1955-56) (Pooled aircraft)
- Airwork Fleet Requirements Unit - FB.2 (1955-57)

== Accidents and incidents ==
- On 23 May 1950, Vickers test pilot Les Colquhoun was flying the first production Attacker F.1 WA469. He was carrying out high-speed tests when during one of the tests the outer portion of the starboard wing folded up and the ailerons became locked. Colquhoun decided not to eject and managed to do a high-speed landing at Chilbolton, in the course of which he used all but the last 100 yards (90 m) of the runway and burst a tyre. The intact aircraft was examined so the cause of the incident could be discovered, Colquhoun was awarded the George Medal for his efforts in saving the aircraft.
- On 5 February 1953, Attacker FB.1 WA535 from RNAS Stretton crashed near Winwick, Cheshire, killing the pilot Mr Roy Edwin Collingwood.
- On 21 July 1953, Attacker FB.2 WP293 (803 NAS) from RNAS Ford, crashed at North Stoke Farm, near Arundel, Sussex, killing the pilot Lieutenant Commander William T R Smith.
- On 10 November 1955, an accident involving Attacker FB.2 WP281, claimed the life of the chief Flying Instructor, Lieutenant Commander Charles James Lavender DSC when he tried to avoid collision with a Percival Sea Prince near RNAS Stretton.
- On 26 June 1956, Attacker FB.1 WK328 practicing deck landings at RNAS Ford crashed near the parish church at Climping, West Sussex. The pilot, Lieutenant Jack Stanner Wyatt of 1832 (RNVR) Squadron, was killed. He was later buried in the churchyard he crashed close to.
- On 6 July 1956, Attacker WP275 crashed into the English Channel off Littlehampton, West Sussex after a wing folded in flight; the pilot ejected safely. Parts of the aircraft were brought to the surface by a dredging vessel in 2005.
- 15 July 1956 WP283, Attacker FB2, 1833 Sqn stalled on approach to RAF Honiley and crashed on a road, killing a civilian.

== Surviving aircraft ==
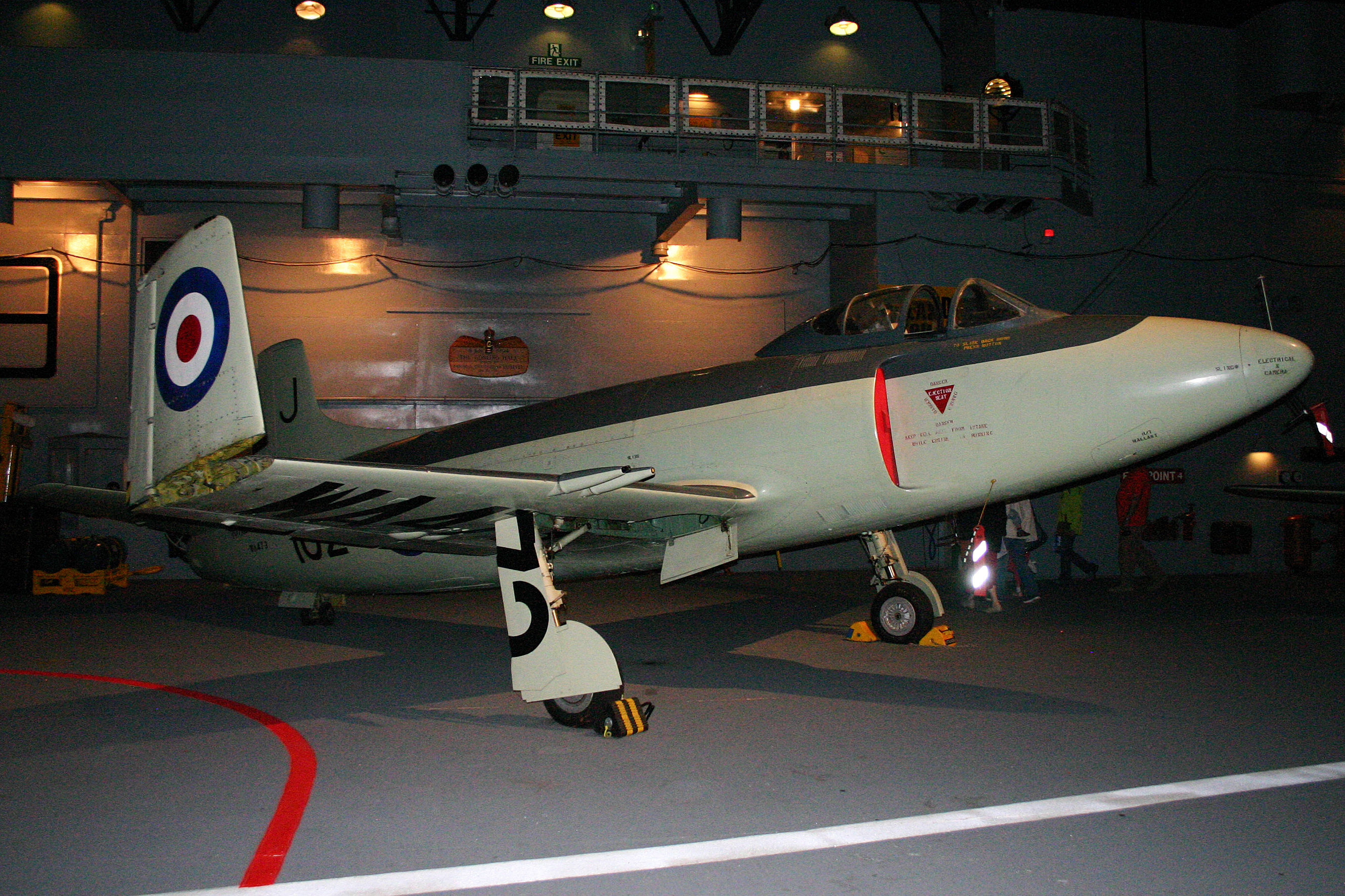
Attacker F.1 WA473 displayed the Fleet Air Arm Museum (2011)

Following its retirement from service in 1956, Attacker F.1 Serial number WA473 was placed on display on the gate at RNAS Abbotsinch. Completed at VAs South Marston factory in July 1951, it had served with 702 and 736 Naval Squadrons. In late 1961, it was moved to the Fleet Air Arm Museum in Somerset.

== Specifications (F.1) ==
Supermarine Attacker 3-view drawing

Data from The Illustrated Encyclopedia of Aircraft

General characteristics

- Crew: 1
- Length: 37 ft 6 in (11.43 m)
- Wingspan: 36 ft 11 in (11.25 m)
- Height: 9 ft 11 in (3.02 m)
- Wing area: 226 sq ft (21 m^{2})
- Empty weight: 8,434 lb (3,826 kg)
- Gross weight: 12,211 lb (5,339 kg)
- Powerplant: 1 × Rolls-Royce Nene turbojet, 5,000 lbf (22 kN) thrust

Performance

- Maximum speed: 590 mph (950 km/h, 512 kn)
- Range: 590 mi (950 km, 510 nmi)
- Service ceiling: 45,000 ft (13,700 m)
- Rate of climb: 6,350 ft/min (32.3 m/s)

Armament

- Guns: 4 × Hispano No. 3 Mark 5 20mm Cannon

== See also ==
Related development

- Supermarine Spiteful
- Supermarine Swift

Aircraft of comparable role, configuration, and era

- de Havilland Sea Vampire – (United Kingdom)
- Hawker Sea Hawk – (United Kingdom)
- McDonnell FH Phantom – (United States)
- North American FJ-1 Fury – (United States)
- Vought F6U Pirate – (United States)
