= Supermarine Type 545 =

1950s British cancelled fighter aircraft

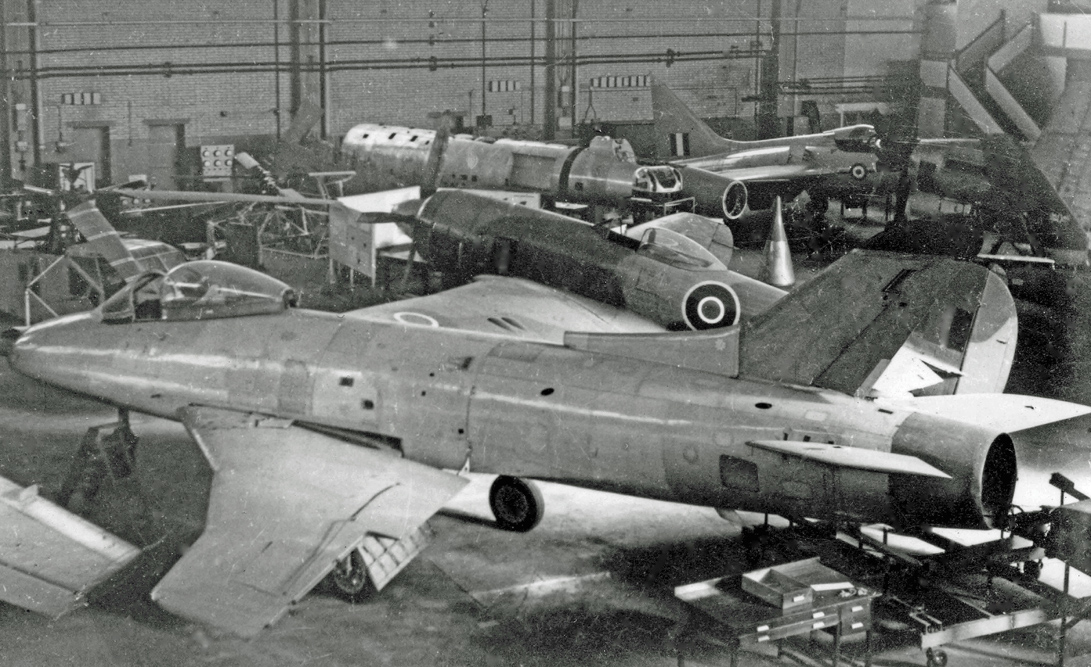
- The Supermarine Type 545 in use as a training airframe at the College of Aeronautics at Cranfield in 1960

General information
- Type: Supersonic fighter aircraft
- National origin: United Kingdom
- Manufacturer: Supermarine
- Status: Completed, but not flown
- Number built: 1

History
- Developed from: Supermarine Swift

The Supermarine Type 545 was a supersonic jet fighter project designed by the British aircraft manufacturer Supermarine. A single aircraft was built, but remained unflown, largely due to the project having fallen out of political favour.

The project commenced during the early 1950s in response to interest in transonic aircraft within the Royal Air Force. Supermarine, which was at the time engaged in the development of another front-line fighter, the Swift, decided to use this existing programme as the Type 545's starting point. Major differences from the proceeding Swift was the adoption of a crescent wing and a more powerful powerplant in the form of the reheated Rolls-Royce Avon turbojet engine; amongst its performance capabilities, Supermarine claimed that the aircraft would be capable of achieving Mach 1.3.

During February 1952, the company received an order for a pair of prototypes to be built. However, by the time that the first was completed, the project had become politically unpalatable due to the considerable shortcomings of the Swift. Having lost confidence in Supermarine, on 25 March 1956, the contract was cancelled prior to the first aircraft ever taking flight. After a brief period in storage, the sole Type 545 was donated as an instructional aid to College of Aeronautics at Cranfield Airport, Bedfordshire; it was eventually scrapped in 1967. A few years later, Supermarine ceased to exist as an independent company.

== Design and development ==
=== Background ===
The origins of the Type 545 can be traced back to the early 1950s and the Royal Air Force's (RAF) interest in developing transonic aircraft to serve as a stopgap while the next generation of supersonic fighters were being developed. Two rival aircraft manufacturers, Supermarine and Hawker, separately prepared proposed such aircraft, both choosing to design derivatives of their respective Swift and Hunter fighter aircraft, these being the Type 545 and Hawker P.1083 respectively. During February 1951, Supermarine made its initial submission; it was formally accepted by the Air Ministry roughly one month later.

At this stage, the Swift programme was in development and its shortcomings were yet to become apparent, this fortunate timing is a factor that aviation author Derek Wood accredits as a major reason for Supermarine's submission having received greater favour over Hawker's bid amongst RAF officials reviewing the two proposals.

The Type 545 had been designed to meet the Air Ministry's Specification F.105D; it was projected to have a maximum speed of Mach 1.3; with better performance than the rival P.1083. Externally, the Type 545 bore a crude resemblance to the Swift. However, the aircraft was radically redesigned, with an area-ruled fuselage amongst other changes.

One of the most visually prominent features of the Type 545 was its unusual crescent-shaped wing, required to meet its performance specification, particularly at supersonic speeds. The lower portion of the fuselage was flattened around the junction with the wings to smooth airflow and avoid the poor low-speed handling characteristics of the Swift. The aircraft's structure comprised a relatively thick exterior skin supported by a thin closely-positioned spanwise web underneath that was claimed to provide the fuselage with an above-average strength-to-weight ratio compared to its contemporaries. The aircraft was powered by a single Rolls-Royce Avon turbojet, which was fitted with reheat, and supplied with air through an elliptical intake near the nose. The position of the intake was different from that of the Swift, which had side intakes.

The crescent wing had three sections, 50° of sweep inboard, 40° in the centre and 30° outboard, the mean aspect ratio would be 7.5 per cent and the thickness/chord ratio reduce from 8 per cent at the root to 6 per cent at the tips.

=== Order and termination ===
During February 1952, Supermarine received an order for two prototype Type 545s to be completed under contract 6/Acft/7711. During 1955, it was announced that work on the Type 545 project was to be cancelled. According to Wood, this was in part due to the considerable difficulties that had been experienced with the Swift, which largely remained unresolved. Specifically, Wood observed that the Swift had become a national scandal by early 1955, which not only tarnished the aircraft but also the RAF and the British aircraft industry, the public and ministers alike generally adopting a more averse nature to aviation and other aircraft projects. The Type 545, with its close association to the Swift, thus became a particular target for scepticism. Others reasons, such as budget constraints having compelled cutbacks, were publicly spoken at the time.

The first of the prototypes, serial number XA181, had been completed at Hursley Park and was preparing for its maiden flight when news was received of the contract's formal cancellation on 25 March 1956. The second aircraft, XA186, which was to be furnished with a more powerful model of the Avon engine that was to enable a maximum speed of Mach 1.6 to be achieved, was cancelled prior to construction of the airframe being commenced. Roughly two years later, Supermarine was effectively dissolved, having been absorbed into what would emerge as the British Aircraft Corporation (BAC).

Shortly following its completion, the sole completed prototype was put into storage by Supermarine during mid-1950s. Several years later, the aircraft was donated to the College of Aeronautics at Cranfield Airport, Bedfordshire, where it was used as an instructional aid for aircraft engineering students attending the college. During 1967, the sole Type 545 was scrapped.

== Specifications (performance estimated) ==
Data from The British Fighter since 1912, Supermarine Aircraft Since 1914

General characteristics

- Crew: 1
- Length: 47 ft 0 in (14.33 m)
- Wingspan: 39 ft 0 in (11.89 m)
- Gross weight: 20,147 lb (9,139 kg)
- Powerplant: 1 × Rolls-Royce RA.14R Avon turbojet, 9,500 lbf (42 kN) thrust dry, 14,500 lbf (64 kN) with afterburner

Performance

- Maximum speed: 858 mph (1,381 km/h, 746 kn) at 36,000 ft (11,000 m)
- Maximum speed: Mach 1.3
- Service ceiling: 53,000 ft (16,000 m)

Armament

- Guns: 4 × 30 mm ADEN cannon
