= Les Colquhoun =

British air pilot (1921-2001)

Leslie Robert Colquhoun
- Born: 15 March 1921; Hanwell, Middlesex, England
- Died: 2001; Kent, England
- Military career
- Allegiance: United Kingdom
- Branch: Royal Air Force
- Rank: Flight Lieutenant
- Conflicts: Second World War
- Awards: Distinguished Flying Cross; George Medal; Distinguished Flying Medal
- Other work: Vickers Armstrongs test pilot

Leslie Robert Colquhoun, DFC, GM, DFM (15 March 1921 – 2001) was a Royal Air Force photographic reconnaissance pilot during the Second World War, test pilot and hovercraft pioneer.

== Early life ==
Colquhoun was born on 15 March 1921 at Hanwell, Middlesex and was educated at Ealing.

== Royal Air Force ==
He joined the Royal Air Force in August 1940 and trained as a pilot. His first posting was to 603 Squadron where he flew the Supermarine Spitfire on operations over France and convoy protection patrols. Later in 1941 Colquhoun was delivering a photographic reconnaissance Spitfire to Cairo but during a stop at Malta he was ordered to join 69 Squadron when it was decided that their need for a PR Spitfire was more important. For nine months in 1941 and 1942, Colquhoun flew operational sorties in his unarmed and pale blue painted Spitfire over Italy. By the time more aircraft arrived in May 1942 aboard HMS Eagle Colquhoun had carried out 154 operational sorties. For his work with 69 Squadron Sergeant Colquhoun was awarded the Distinguished Flying Medal and commissioned as a Pilot Officer.

Colquhoun returned to the United Kingdom where he trained to fly the photographic reconnaissance variant of de Havilland Mosquito at 2 OTU in Scotland. In 1943 he joined 682 Squadron based in Algeria and later moved to Italy. He stayed with the squadron until October 1944 and carried out 262 operational sorties. For his work with 682 Squadron he was awarded the DFC.

After a short period as an instructor at 2 OTU he was posted to Vickers Supermarine as a production test pilot. He was part of a team that test flew Spitfires as they left the production lines.

== Test pilot ==
In 1946 when he left the RAF he was invited to remain at Vickers as part of the test flying team. He soon showed an aptitude for testing new types and was soon involved in the testing of new naval fighters the jet-powered Attacker and Scimitar.

In May 1950 Colquhoun was flying an Attacker to test the effectiveness of the air brakes. On the third of two dives the outer portion of the starboard wing folded up and the ailerons became locked. Colquhoun decided not to eject and managed to do a high-speed landing at Chilbolton, he used all but the last 100 yards (90m) of the runway and burst a tyre. He had saved the aircraft so the cause could be discovered and was awarded the George Medal for his efforts.

== Hovercraft ==
Colquhoun was soon testing the new hovercraft being produced by Vickers and went on to become operations manager of Vickers' Hovercraft division. In 1962 Colquhoun piloted a Vickers-Armstrongs VA-3 on the first public hovercraft service which was between Wallasey and Rhyl. In 1966 he joined Hoverlloyd as operational manager for the cross channel hovercraft service, he later becoming managing director. When Hoverlloyd was taken over by Seaspeed he then ran their jetfoil service to Dieppe.

== Later life ==
Colquhoun became custodian of Chiddingstone Castle before he retired to live at Broadstairs in Kent. He died in 2001 leaving a wife and four daughters.

== Honours and awards ==
- 1 August 1950 – Leslie Robert Colquhoun, DFC, DFM, Civil Test Pilot, Vickers Armstrongs Ltd., Supermarine Works. (Chilbolton, Hampshire) is awarded the George Medal:

Colquhoun was carrying out high speed tests on the first production of an aircraft and in the course of one of these tests, at a very high speed, the outer portion of the starboard wing folded up and remained vertical. The ailerons were virtually locked and control was almost lost, but the pilot found that by the use of full left rudder and by maintaining a speed in excess of 200 knots he could retain some measure of control. He would have been fully justified in abandoning the aircraft, but he realised the importance of investigating the cause of the failure quickly and the delay which would be involved if the aircraft was damaged so extensively as to conceal the original cause. He therefore decided to attempt to retain control and land. By skill and judgment of a very high order he made a successful landing at the airfield, thereby enabling the cause of the wing failure to be quickly ascertained and rectified. Colquhoun showed exceptional courage and coolness in circumstances of great danger and deliberately risked his life to bring the aircraft down intact.

— London Gazette

== Bibliography ==
Bingham, Victor (2004). Supermarine Fighter Aircraft. The Crowood Press. ISBN 1-86126-649-9.
