= Spaniel (missile) =

British World War II missile family

Spaniel was a series of experimental British missiles of the Second World War. They began as surface-to-air missile designs developed by the Air Ministry from 1941. Based on the 3-inch Unrotated Projectile anti-aircraft rocket, it proved to have too little performance to easily reach typical bomber altitudes, leading to further development as an air-to-air missile carried aloft by heavy fighters. Some progress had been made by 1942 when the program was cancelled as the threat of German air attack dwindled. Further research was directed at a dedicated air-to-air design, Artemis.

== Spaniel SAMs ==
Development of cast solid fuel rockets began at the Woolwich Arsenal in the years immediately before the opening of World War II. This research was moved to the newly-formed Ministry of Supply Projectile Development Establishment at Fort Halstead. Three designs were initially developed under the name Unrotated Projectile, a 2 in (51 mm) diameter short-range weapon, a 7 in (180 mm) short-range weapon that carried a large warhead or a wire intended to snag aircraft, and the 3 in (76 mm) anti-bomber weapon that triggered by a photoelectric cell intended to fire when it lost illumination by a searchlight as it passed the target.

As the development of the UP series continued, in 1941 the idea was raised that the same photoelectric system could be used to guide the rocket, not just trigger it. This idea had been raised on several occasions in the past, and led to similar development efforts in other UK military research establishments, notably the contemporary Royal Aircraft Establishment (RAE) Ben. In an era when several thousand anti-aircraft artillery rounds had to be fired to get a single "kill", the idea that a small number of rockets could achieve the same seemed like an enormous advantage, and at a predicted price of £130 per round, the concept seemed to be dramatically less expensive as well.

For manoeuvering, the basic 3-inch UP was modified by adding long wings running along the fuselage from just behind the nose to just in front of the tail-mounted fins. Those fins, initially triangular and fixed in position on the UP-3, were replaced by rectangular ones that rotated for control. Two guidance systems were developed. The first, PE Spaniel, used the original photoelectric guidance system. The cell was mounted in a pod at the end of one of the wings and sent control inputs to the movable rear-mounted fins. The second, RDF Spaniel, used beam riding using the signal from the GL Mark III radar sets.

In testing, it was found that the energy needed to manoeuvre the rocket in flight greatly limited its range, to the point where it was no longer able to effectively reach target altitudes. Some consideration was given to using separate rocket motors for manoeuvering, but it is unclear whether this was actually attempted. A larger 4.2-inch (110 mm) diameter version was also considered, but development was cancelled in 1942 when the Luftwaffe activity over England dwindled.

== Air Spaniel ==
Another development of the Spaniel system was Air Spaniel, a version of PE Spaniel intended to be carried by heavy fighters like the Bristol Beaufighter. Because it was air-launched it did not suffer from the same problems of a lack of energy needed to reach its targets, but the system was considered too inaccurate to be useful.

Further development followed, using command guidance by the radar operator in the aircraft. This relied on the AI Mark V radar which included a separate display for the pilot which indicated the relative direction of the target compared to the nose of the aircraft. Superimposed on the target's "blip" was a horizontal line indicating the range, growing longer as the aircraft approached. This was similar to the appearance of wings on the target, which appear to grow larger as you approach. Marks on the radar display indicated fixed ranges when the "wing" line was spanning the marks.

For RDF Spaniel, the idea was that the pilot would use this display to position the fighter behind its target and then approach to a fixed range of about 2,000 yd (1,800 m). The missile would then be fired, and after a short time would also appear on the display. Because it was closer to the fighter, the "wings" on its blip would be longer, allowing it to be distinguished from the target. The radar operator, viewing the same display, would use a joystick to guide the missile so the two dots overlapped, and then watch until the missile's wing was the same length as the targets and trigger the warhead.

When fired from the specified 2000 yards, the actual distance traveled by the missile would be about 3,000 yd (2,700 m) as both aircraft continued moving. Flying at 1,150 ft/s (780 mph; 1,260 km/h), the flight took a total of six seconds. The missile was unguided during the first two seconds of flight.
