= Supermarine Swift =

British single-seat jet-propelled fighter aircraft

Swift
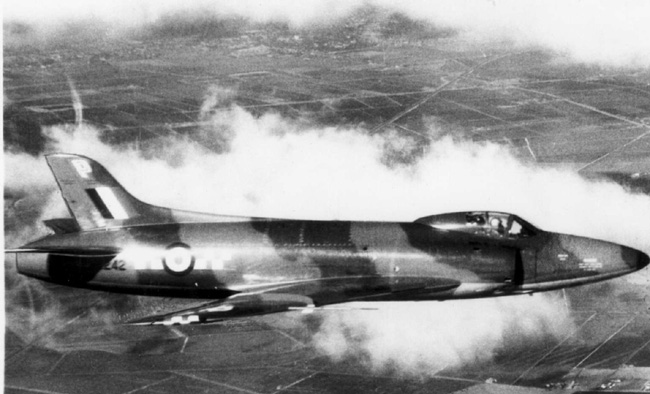
- Swift F Mk.2 WK242 / "P" of No. 56 Sqn.

General information
- Type: Fighter, interceptor
- National origin: United Kingdom
- Manufacturer: Supermarine Aviation Works (Vickers) Ltd.
- Status: Retired
- Primary user: Royal Air Force
- Number built: 197

History
- Introduction date: 1954
- First flight: 29 December 1948 (Type 510)
- Retired: 1967
- Developed from: Supermarine Attacker
- Developed into: Supermarine 545

The Supermarine Swift is a British single-seat jet fighter aircraft that was operated by the Royal Air Force (RAF). It was developed and manufactured by Supermarine during the 1940s and 1950s. The Swift featured many of the new jet age innovations, such as a swept wing. On 26 September 1953, a Swift F.4 piloted by Mike Lithgow broke the world absolute speed record, reaching a speed of 735.7 mph (1,187 km/h).

After a protracted development period, the Swift entered service as an interceptor aircraft with the RAF in 1954. However, due to a spate of accidents incurred by the type, the Swift was grounded for a time, and had a relatively brief service life. The problems with the Swift led to a public scandal surrounding the development and performance of the aircraft, harming the reputations of the British government, the RAF, and the British aircraft industry.

Ultimately, the less problematic Hawker Hunter assumed much of the role intended for the Swift and only half as many Swifts were manufactured as had once been intended. A later photo reconnaissance variant of the Swift had resolved some of the teething problems, but that proved to be too late for it to regain favour. An advanced derivative of the Swift that was to be capable of transonic speeds, the Supermarine 545, was also under development during the early 1950s. However, it was cancelled in 1955, principally due to the poor performance of the Swift.

== Design and development ==
=== Background ===
In 1945 the Second World War ended and a new Labour government, headed by Clement Attlee, came to power in Britain. The incoming government's initial stance on defence was that no major conflict would occur for at least a decade, so there would be no need to develop or procure any new aircraft until 1957. Accordingly, apart from a few exceptions such as what would become the Hawker Sea Hawk for the Royal Navy, the majority of Specifications issued by the Air Ministry for fighter-sized aircraft during the late 1940s were for research purposes.

In part, the Swift had its origins in the experimental fighter prototypes that had been developed. Specifically, a number of Supermarine-built prototypes had been ordered under Specification E.41/46, which had sought the production of an experimental fighter aircraft with a swept wing. The first of these was the Type 510, which was substantially based on the straight-wing Supermarine Attacker, which was procured for the Fleet Air Arm. The principal difference from the Attacker was that it had a swept wing. The Type 510 made its maiden flight in 1948, a year after the first navalised prototype Attacker had flown, making it the first British aircraft to fly with both swept wings and a swept tailplane. In trials for the Fleet Air Arm, the Type 510 was also the first swept-wing aircraft to take off from and land on an aircraft carrier.

During the late 1940s, in the face of the emerging Cold War, the RAF came to recognise that it would urgently require the development and procurement of fighters equipped with features such as swept wings. That need was felt to be so pressing that it was willing to accept interim fighter aircraft while more capable fighters were being developed. In 1950, with the outbreak of the Korean War, Britain's involvement in that conflict led to a flurry of orders being placed. In particular, the RAF felt that a pair of proposed fighter aircraft from Hawker Aircraft and Supermarine were of great importance and, in the same year, ordered the proposed fighters "off the drawing board". The Supermarine design was designated as the Type 541, and was essentially an advanced development of the earlier Type 510 experimental aircraft.

The initial order placed in 1950 for 100 aircraft was intended to serve as an insurance policy in the event that Hawker failed to produce a viable aircraft. . In early 1946, the Type 541 order was increased to 150 aircraft, the Air Ministry hoping that it would enter service before the rival Hunter. However, the development of both types was protracted.

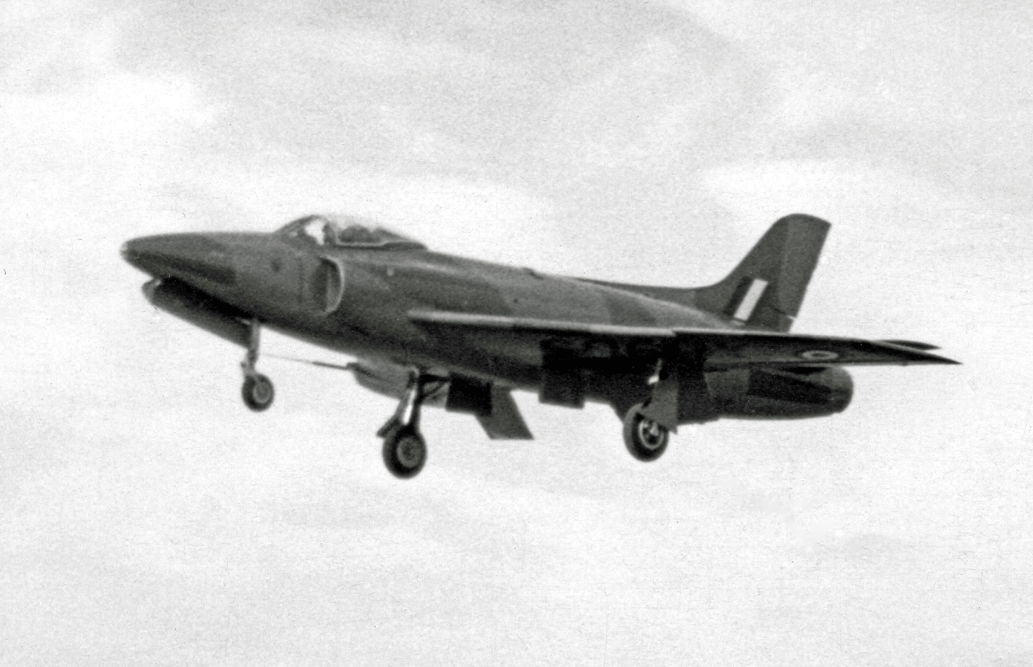
Swift FR.5 landing at the Farnborough air show in 1955

The Type 541 replaced its predecessors' Rolls-Royce Nene centrifugal flow turbojet engine with the axial-flow Rolls-Royce AJ.65 turbojet, which became the Avon series. The fuselage, which had been given a cross section suitable for the Nene engine, was not redesigned for the narrower AJ.65 and Avon engines, and retained a somewhat portly appearance. The aircraft also had with a tricycle undercarriage. Two of Type 541 prototypes were built. The first made its maiden flight on 1 August 1951 and the second during the following year.

=== Into production ===
Production of the Swift had been declared to be a "super-priority" item under a policy created by Sir Winston Churchill, who had regained the position of Britain's prime minister in 1951, as a means of increasing projects considered to be of vital military importance. Volume manufacturing commenced in advance of the implementation of modifications based on the results of flight experiences with the prototypes: "too much had been asked for in too little time and production aircraft were coming the production line before a major redesign could be accomplished".

The first production variant was a fighter designated the Swift F Mk 1, of which 18 were eventually built. It was powered by a single 7,500 lbf (33.4 kN)-thrust Avon 109 engine and was armed with two 30 mm ADEN cannons. On 25 August 1952, the first flight of a production standard Swift F 1 took place. Peter Thorne, who had been appointed as the senior RAF test pilot for the incoming Swift in 1954, came to doubt the aircraft's suitability. Thorne and several other pilots noted the Swift had unusual handling qualities, as well as a troublesome engine.

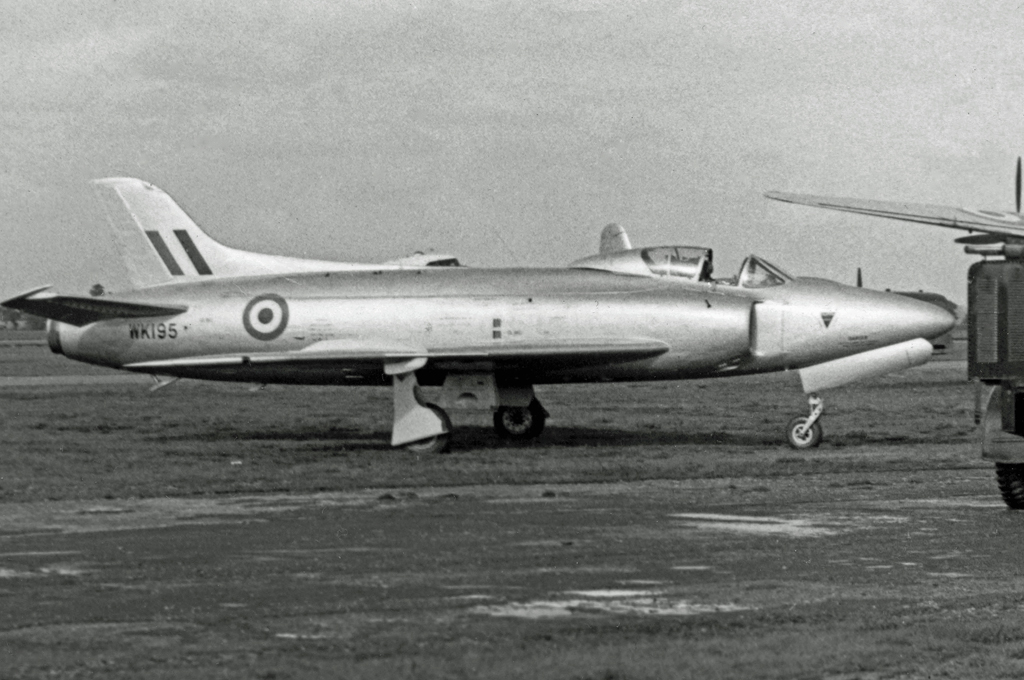
Swift.F.1 test aircraft operated by Vickers-Armstrong in 1953

The second variant was the Swift F Mk 2, of which 16 were built. It was practically the same as the F 1, except for being fitted with two extra ADENs and the leading edge of the wing was altered from straight to a compound sweep. However, the addition of the cannon caused problems, because the modifications required to house the increased ammunition load led to dangerous handling characteristics, and it was also clear that more thrust was required from its engine. Numerous further modifications were required to resolve the problems.

The third Swift variant was the F Mk 3, of which 25 were built, powered by an Avon 114 engine with reheat. It was never put into operational service with the Royal Air Force and was used as an instructional airframe. The next variant was the F Mk.4, which included a variable incidence tailplane, intended to correct the handling problems that the Swift suffered from. It did fix the problem, but it was found that reheat could not be ignited at high altitude, adding to the Swift's list of problems.

The next in the line, the FR Mk 5, had a longer nose to accommodate a number of cameras to allow a reconnaissance role, as well as other modifications to its structure. The FR 5 also reverted to the F 1's twin ADEN cannon armament. It first flew in 1955 and entered service the following year, performing reconnaissance mainly at low level, making the reheat problem at high altitude irrelevant.

Two further variants were designed. The PR Mk 6 was an unarmed photo reconnaissance plane. However, its use was short-lived, due to the ever-present reheat problems. The last variant was the F Mk 7, which was the first Swift model to be fitted with guided missiles, the Fairey Fireflash air-to-air missile, and was powered by a new model of the Avon. Only fourteen F 7 aircraft were built and none ever entered service with the RAF, being relegated – along with its prototype missiles – to conducting guided-missile trials.

=== Proposed derivative ===
In 1953, as a response to growing RAF interest in developing transonic aircraft to serve as a stopgap while the next generation of supersonic fighters were being developed, both Supermarine and Hawker proposed derivatives of their respective Swift and Hunter aircraft. By that time, the shortcomings of the Swift were not yet apparent, which perhaps had allowed Supermarine to gain the RAF's favour for its proposal, designated as the Type 545, over the rival Hawker P.1083. The Type 545 had been drawn up to conform with the requirements given by Specification F.105D. It was to have been capable of attaining Mach 1.3. powered by an Avon engine, promising superior performance to that of the P.1083. The Type 545 bore a resemblance to the Swift, although it was a complete redesign, having an area-ruled fuselage and wing changes. In 1955, work on the project was cancelled, in part due to the considerable difficulties experienced with the Swift.

== Operational history ==
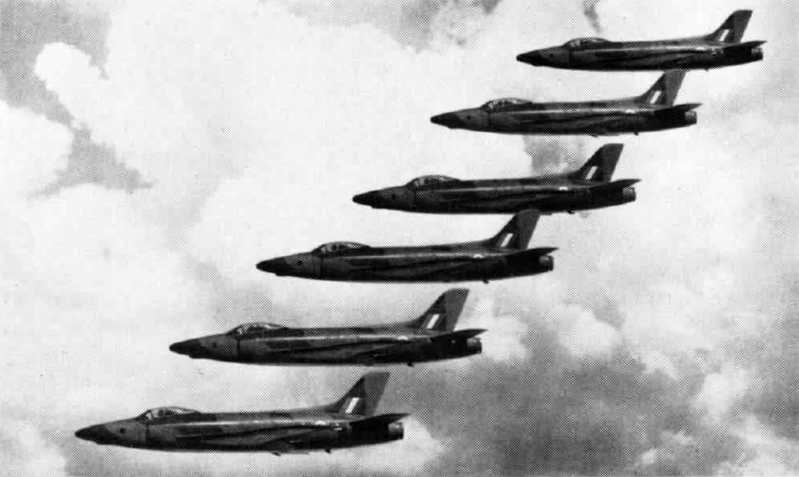
Close formation of six Swifts, 1956

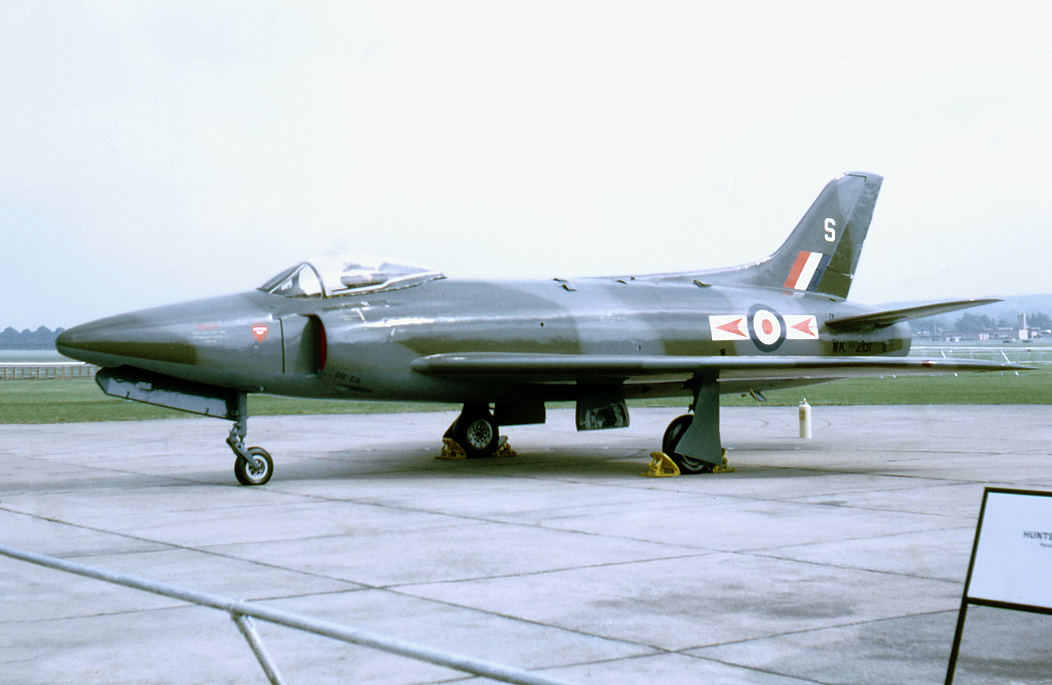
Swift FR.5 WK281 wearing the markings of No. 79 Squadron RAF

In February 1954, the Swift F 1 entered service with the RAF, No. 56 Squadron becoming the first RAF squadron to operate the type. With its introduction, the Swift became the RAF's first swept-wing aircraft. The Swift F 2 entered service that same month. Wood refers to the type's introduction as having been "panicked", and that the adoption soon proved to be an "abysmal failure". Tragedy struck very early in the career of the Swift: there were a number of accidents that involved the F 1 and F 2, one of them being fatal. In August 1954, it was decided that the Swift F 1 would be grounded, and the Swift F 2, which had effectively replaced the F 1 that same month, was also soon grounded as well, for similar reasons.

The Swift F 3 and F 4 fighters were noted to have improved performance over their predecessors. The F 4 was the last variant that the RAF would accept in an interceptor role. All fighter variants of the Swift were withdrawn from service by the RAF after a short time in service, to be replaced by the more capable Hawker Hunter. While subject to its own problems, the Hunter had quickly proved to be a successful fighter aircraft. By autumn 1954, the problems with the Swift had become public knowledge, and reports of the pending cancellation of the Swift appeared in the national press. In Parliament, Under-Secretary of State for Air Sir George Ward said of the aircraft: "Aerodynamic difficulties have been encountered, and it is not possible to say with certainty if they can be overcome in the version under development".

In early February 1955, it was rumoured that the Swift had failed its final evaluation by the RAF Central Fighter Establishment, and that the type was likely to be restricted to aerial reconnaissance or to ground attack roles. On 2 March 1955, Minister of Supply Selwyn Lloyd acknowledged that development of the Swift had cost £20 million prior to the scrapping of the fighter variants. According to Wood, the Swift had become a national scandal by early 1955, which not only tarnished the aircraft, but also the RAF and the British aircraft industry, with the public and the government generally becoming more averse to other aircraft projects.

The FR.5 was the last Swift variant to enter service with the RAF and was eventually replaced by the Hunter FR.10, with the FR.5 leaving RAF service entirely in 1961. The Swift FR. 5 had been deemed suitable for its role and was based with two squadrons that were assigned to RAF Germany. The Swift never saw combat action with the RAF, but it did break a number of speed records in its time. In Libya, on 26 September 1953, an F.4 (WK198) piloted by Mike Lithgow broke the world absolute speed record, reaching a speed of 735.7 mph (1,187 km/h), It was broken again eight days later by the Douglas Skyray, a United States Navy (USN) fighter. The Swift has the distinction of being the last British production aircraft to hold the record (the Fairey Delta 2 was experimental). Fewer than two hundred Swifts were built from an order of 497. A number of Swift airframes were taken to Australia for Operation Buffalo in 1956. They were placed at various distances from a detonating atomic bomb to assess the effects of nuclear weapons on aircraft structures.

Its last variant had resolved many of the problems that had plagued earlier Swifts but the programme was not continued. The Hunter, performing satisfactorily in the same roles, removed any requirement to persist with the Swift.

== Variants ==
World Air Speed Record certificate for Swift WK198, piloted by Mike Lithgow.

Type 510
Prototype developed from the Vickers Supermarine Attacker still with a tailwheel undercarriage but with swept wings and tail.
Type 517
Prototype fitted with a variable incidence tailplane.
Type 535
Prototype fitted with a nosewheel undercarriage.
Swift F.Mk 1
Single-seat fighter aircraft, fitted with a fixed variable-incidence tailplane, powered by a Rolls-Royce Avon 109 turbojet engine, armed with two 30-mm ADEN cannons.
Swift F.Mk 2
Single-seat fighter aircraft, powered by a Rolls-Royce Avon 109 turbojet engine, armed with four 30-mm ADEN cannons.
Swift F.Mk 3
Single-seat fighter aircraft, wing leading edges extended at the wingtips, powered by a Rolls-Royce Avon 114 afterburning turbojet engine, armed with four 30-mm ADEN cannons.
Swift F.Mk 4
Single-seat fighter aircraft, fitted with a variable-incidence tailplane, tailfin increased in height by one foot, powered by a Rolls-Royce Avon 114 afterburning turbojet engine, armed with four 30-mm ADEN cannons.
Swift FR.Mk 5
Single-seat tactical-reconnaissance aircraft, fitted with a lengthened nose to accommodate three cameras, equipped with a frameless cockpit canopy, powered by a Rolls-Royce Avon 114 afterburning turbojet engine, armed with two 30-mm ADEN cannons.
Swift PR.Mk 6
Proposed unarmed reconnaissance variant, one partially built before being cancelled.
Swift F.Mk 7
Single-seat fighter aircraft, fitted with a lengthened nose to accommodate a radar, powered by a Rolls-Royce Avon 114 afterburning turbojet engine, armed with four Fairey Fireflash air-to-air missiles and four 30-mm ADEN cannons.

== Operators ==
United Kingdom

- Royal Air Force
  - No. 2 Squadron RAF operated FR.5 variant.
  - No. 4 Squadron RAF operated the FR.5 variant.
  - No. 56 Squadron RAF operated F.1 and F.2 variants.
  - No. 79 Squadron RAF operated FR.5 variant.

== Aircraft on display ==
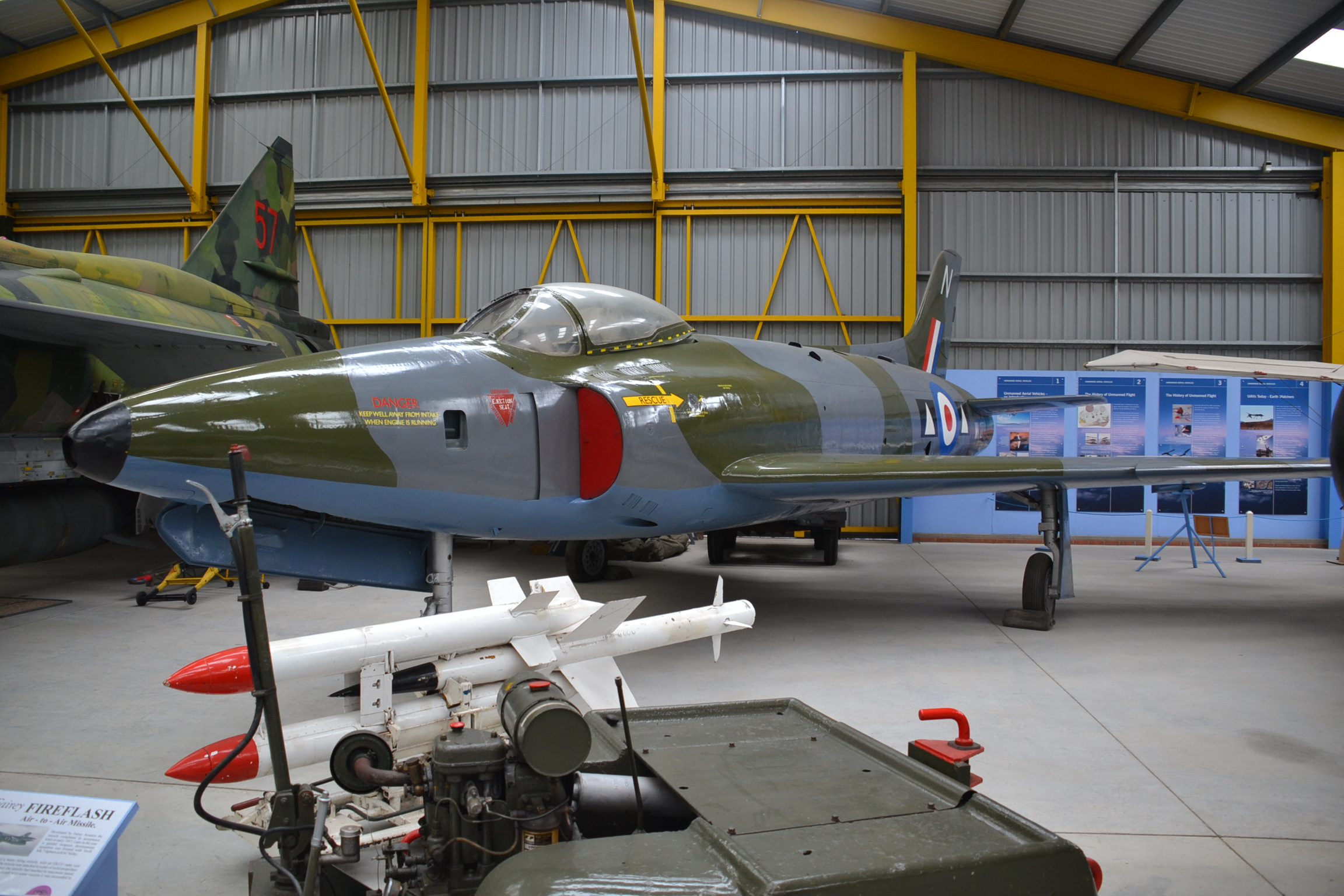
A Swift FR.5 on static display at Newark Air Museum In the foreground is a Fairey Fireflash, the missile armament intended for the Swift F.7.

- VV106 (Supermarine Type 517) is stored by the Fleet Air Arm Museum, Yeovilton, England.
- WK198 (the F.4 prototype, fuselage only) this former World Air Speed record holder is on display at Brooklands Museum, Surrey; it was first held at the North East Aircraft Museum, Sunderland, England, on 2 April 2008 it was relocated to the RAF Millom Museum, Cumbria, but with that museum's closure in September 2010, WK198 was transferred to Brooklands on 3 February 2011.
- WK275 (F.4) Having spent four years being restored to exhibition standard by Jet Art Aviation, this aircraft is now on loan to the Vulcan To The Sky Trust. It represents the definitive fighter variant with slab tail.
- WK277 (FR.5) on display at the Newark Air Museum, Newark, England.
- WK281 (FR.5) on display at the Tangmere Military Aviation Museum, Tangmere, England.
- G-SWIF (F.7, the former XF114) is stored by Solent Sky, Southampton, England.

== Specifications (Supermarine Swift FR Mk.5) ==
Supermarine Swift 3-view drawings

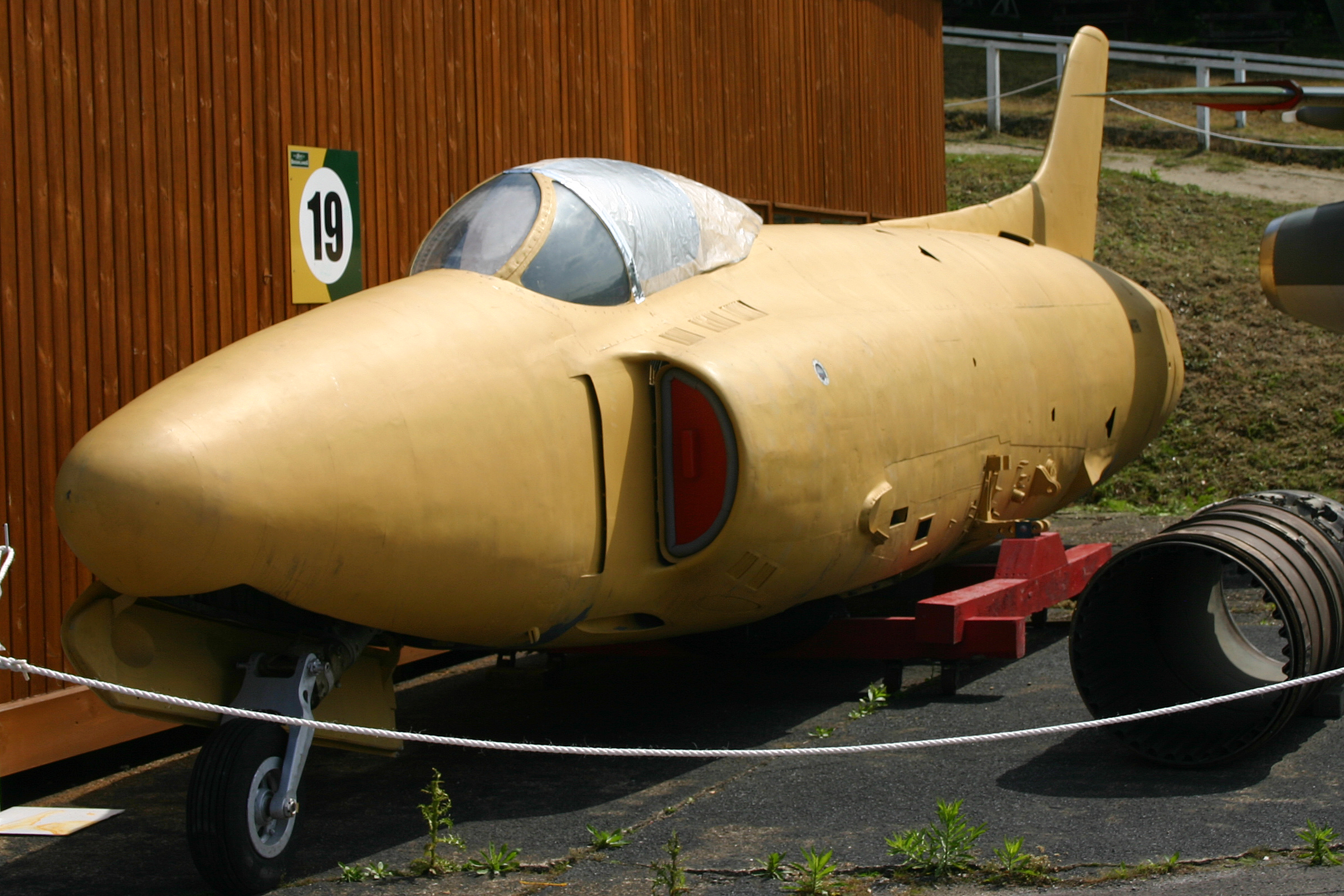
The fuselage of WK198 on display at the Brooklands Museum

Data from Supermarine Aircraft since 1914 (2nd ed.)

General characteristics

- Crew: 1
- Length: 42 ft 3 in (12.88 m)
- Wingspan: 32 ft 4 in (9.86 m)
- Height: 13 ft 2 in (4.01 m)
- Wing area: 327.7 sq ft (30.44 m^{2})
- Empty weight: 13,435 lb (6,094 kg)
- Gross weight: 21,673 lb (9,831 kg)
- Fuel capacity: 778 imp gal (934 US gal; 3,540 L) internals with 220 imp gal (260 US gal; 1,000 L) belly drop tank
- Powerplant: 1 × Rolls-Royce Avon RA.7R (Avon 114) turbojet engine, 7,175 lbf (31.92 kN) thrust dry, 9,450 lbf (42.0 kN) with afterburner

Performance

- Maximum speed: 620 kn (710 mph, 1,150 km/h) at sea level
- Range: 547.5 nmi (630.1 mi, 1,014.0 km)
- Service ceiling: 45,800 ft (14,000 m)
- Rate of climb: 14,660 ft/min (74.5 m/s)
- Time to altitude: 40,000 ft (12,000 m) in 4 minutes 41 seconds

Armament

- Guns: 2 × 30 mm (1.181 in) ADEN cannon
- Rockets: provisions for rockets
- Bombs: provisions for bombs

== See also ==
Related development

- Supermarine Spiteful
- Supermarine Attacker

Aircraft of comparable role, configuration, and era

- CAC Sabre
- Dassault Ouragan
- de Havilland Venom
- Grumman F9F Cougar
- Hawker Hunter
- Mikoyan-Gurevich MiG-17
- North American F-86D Sabre
- Republic F-84F Thunderstreak
- Saab 29 Tunnan

Related lists

- List of aircraft of the Royal Air Force
