= Artemis (missile) =

Artemis, named for the Greek goddess of the hunt, was an early air-to-air missile project carried out by the Royal Aircraft Establishment (RAE) beginning in late 1943. The missile was intended for radar-equipped night fighters like the Bristol Beaufighter, which would track the target on their AI Mk. IV radar and then fire at a set range, with the missile homing on the signal of the AI radar being reflected off the target.

The concept for Artemis led from an earlier project, Spaniel, a surface-to-air missile based on the RP-3 rocket motor. During development, a variation known as Air Spaniel was considered which would use radio control for guidance. It was clear from early in the project that the six-second flight time would make such a system extremely difficult for the operator to correctly aim the missile in time, and the RAE decided that any such weapon had to be automatically guided.

Artemis replaced the radio control system with a radio receiver to produce a simple form of semi-active radar homing that would guide it on a curving path to its target. The project was cancelled when it was seen that the RP-3 based rocket had too short a range to keep the fighter outside the bomber aircraft's defensive guns, especially during the period when the Luftwaffe was upgrading its aircraft with more powerful 20mm cannon. A larger design, Little Ben, took over development.

There was a brief reprieve during the early stages of the V-1 flying bomb attacks in June 1944 as Artemis would allow slower aircraft to attack these weapons, but this was abandoned when radar-guided anti-aircraft guns and high-performance fighters proved effective.

== Spaniel ==
Artemis ultimately traces its history to a 1941 project known as Spaniel. Spaniel was initially developed as a surface-to-air missile (SAM) using a 3-inch Unrotated Projectile (UP-3) rocket with an optical guidance system using a photocell. When it was found that the UP-3 had too little performance to reach the targets while still having enough speed to guide itself using aerodynamic surfaces, two new concepts were developed.

The first was to use rockets to guide the weapon instead of traditional aerodynamic surfaces, but it is unclear whether any actual development was carried out along these lines. The second was to mount the Spaniel on a heavy fighter like the Bristol Beaufighter, at which point its limited range was no longer seen as a problem. As this concept was developed, a new seeker system using command guidance was developed. This would work in concert with new display systems for the AI Mk. IV radar that would allow the radar operator in the aircraft to see both the missile and the target on a single display, and then use a joystick to guide the missile to the target as it flew.

There were numerous concerns with the overall concept, ultimately leading to it being cancelled in 1942, as Luftwaffe attacks on the UK declined.

== Artemis ==
The primary concern with the Spaniel was its short flight time, on the order of six seconds when fired at its ideal range of about 2,000 yards (1,800 m). Flight Lieutenant Benson of the RAE had worked on Spaniel and felt that the operator would have too little time to accurately guide the weapon, especially given the first two seconds were unguided. He also pointed out systems were needed to keep the missile from spinning, which would make manual control impossible if the "up and down" axis continually rotated. These systems added significant cost and complexity.

In 1943, Benson began the design of a new missile dedicated from the start as an air-to-air weapon. He proposed the name Artemis as "the Greek goddess of chase and death (may the Hun offer continual sacrifice)." The new design was created around the basic idea of allowing the missile to spin, using this as the primary method of stabilization and guidance.

A small radio receiver tuned to the launch aircraft's AI Mk. IV radar was mounted in the nose of the missile. It had a highly directional antenna that made it sensitive only to one side of the missile fuselage. As the missile spun, it would periodically receive the radar signal as the antenna rotated past the target. Every time a signal was seen, a small plate would be flipped into the airstream, pulling the nose in that direction.

The guidance system was not particularly powerful as it only actively turned the missile toward the target during the short periods when it was visible to the antenna. To increase the amount of time that was so, the nose section was mounted on a spindle and allowed to rotate independently of the rocket body. Small fins along the base of the nose caused it to spin at a rapid speed. Venting the rocket exhaust from a small hole at the rear of the missile was also considered as an alternate to the plate, providing more turning force.

Because of the directionality of the antenna, it did not receive any signal when the target was dead ahead. This had the advantage of preventing the aerodynamic plate from being constantly deployed as it approached to closer range. It also meant the missile should not be launched with the fighter pointed directly at the target, they would have to be positioned so that the reflection of their radar would be visible to one side at launch. Artemis would then follow a curving path toward the target.

Development was given a boost by the introduction of the V-1 flying bomb in 1944, but new radar-guided anti-aircraft artillery and high-performance fighters proved to have the combination of features needed to defeat this threat. There were also concerns that the range of Artemis was too short to keep it out of the lethal range of new aircraft guns, which were moving to 20mm cannon and larger. Development ended in favour of a much larger and more developed weapon, Little Ben.
