= Supermarine Seagull (1948) =

Seaplane, also known as the "Seagull ASR-1", built by the British company Supermarine

Type 381 Seagull
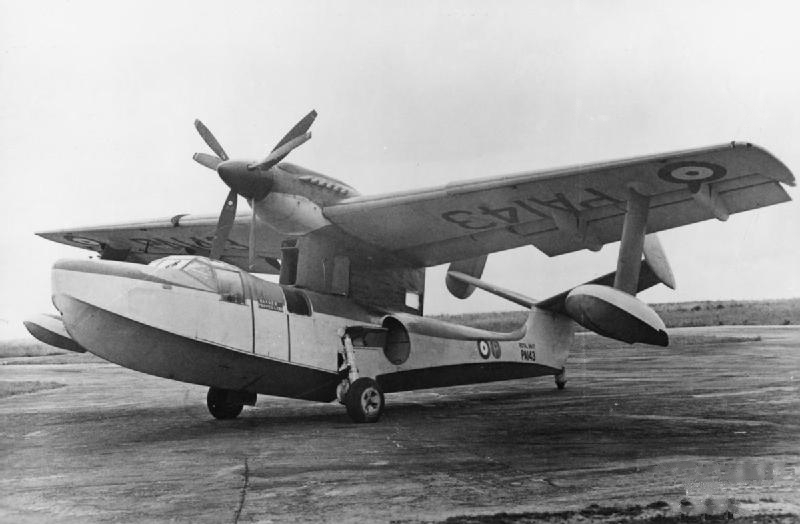
- The first Seagull prototype, PA143 (1948)

General information
- Type: Air-sea rescue amphibian
- Manufacturer: Supermarine
- Status: Prototypes only
- Primary user: Royal Navy
- Number built: 2 (plus 1 uncompleted)

History
- First flight: 14 July 1948
- Retired: 1952

The Supermarine Seagull was a British amphibious, military flying boat and the last to be built by the Supermarine company. Design started during the Second World War but it did not fly until three years after the war had ended and the project was cancelled without it being adopted for service.

== Development ==
In October 1940, the British Air Ministry issued Specification S.12/40 to Supermarine and Fairey for a catapult-launched, amphibian, reconnaissance and spotter aircraft to replace the Supermarine Walrus and Supermarine Sea Otter. An order for three prototypes of Supermarine's aircraft was issued in March 1943.

There was an interruption in design due to the necessity of moving the Supermarine design office, after the bombing of the facility at Woolston. Further delays were caused by the extensive wind tunnel testing that was needed and the change from a Rolls-Royce Merlin to the more powerful Rolls-Royce Griffon. Also, the design specification was changed in 1944 to a new requirement, S.14/44 (later S.14/44/2) - the role of the aircraft being changed from ship-based reconnaissance and gunnery spotting to land-based Air-sea rescue. This change removed the four-gun turret the design had featured.

The first prototype - Seagull serial PA143 - first took off on 14 July 1948 from Southampton Water, flown by test pilot Mike Lithgow. The second aircraft - PA147 - flew in September 1949, and was used for carrier trials on HMS Ark Royal later in that year, during which it demonstrated the capability to carry five passengers. Experiments were also carried out with rocket assisted take-offs.

By the early 1950s, helicopters were taking over the air-sea rescue role. In 1952, the two completed prototypes and the partially built third aircraft, PA152, were scrapped.

== Design ==
The Seagull had an all-metal construction with a two spar parasol wing mounted on a pylon connecting it to the fuselage. The single engine, a Rolls-Royce Griffon drove contra-rotating propellers; radiators were mounted below the engine in the pylon. The rear of the pylon accommodated an observer's position with two windows. An eye bolt was fitted on the wing, behind the engine, so the aircraft could be easily lifted from the water by crane.

The wings were fitted with slotted flaps and full length leading edge slats and could be folded for compact, ship-board stowage. They also had a variable angle of incidence, pivoting at the front spar and actuated by an electrically driven jackscrew attached to the rear spar. This arrangement reduced stalling speed and increased lift, allowing the aircraft to use a smaller wing – compactness being an important feature for a ship-borne aircraft.

Supermarine had tested this arrangement in the Type 322 and its capability was demonstrated when test pilot Mike Lithgow flew a Seagull at only 35 miles per hour (56 km/h). In July 1950, a Seagull, flown by Les Colquhoun competing in the Air League Cup Race gained the air-speed record for amphibian aircraft over a 100-kilometre (62 mi) course, by flying at an average speed of 241.9 miles per hour (389.3 km/h).

The hull was a normal frame and longeron design with chines. The tailplane, carried on top of the fin, had a very large dihedral, with smaller fins mounted on its tips perpendicular to its surface. A third fin was later added to the centre after testing of the first prototype had revealed an instability in yaw. This was added to the second prototype while it was still being constructed.

The undercarriage retracted into bays on either side of the fuselage and could be easily removed, saving 180 kilograms (400 lb) of weight when the aircraft was operating as a pure flying-boat. The Seagull was also fitted with an arrestor hook for carrier landings; mounting points for JATO rockets were located just above the wheel wells.

The crew normally consisted of three. During air-sea rescue work, a Seagull would be able to accommodate a pilot, navigator and medic, plus up to seven survivors.

== Operators ==
United Kingdom

- Royal Navy

== Specifications (Seagull ASR.1) ==
(performance - production aircraft estimated performance with Griffon 57 / RG30SM)

Data from Supermarine aircraft since 1914, Dumbo and Seagull,

General characteristics

- Crew: 3
- Capacity: up to seven survivors (2 on bunks, one seated and four on "emergency stations" on floor)
- Length: 44 ft 1 1/2 in (13.45 m)
- Wingspan: 52 ft 6 in (16.00 m)
- Width: 23 ft 6 in (7.16 m) wings folded
- Height: 15 ft 10 1/2 in (4.84 m) on wheels, tail down
- Wing area: 432 sq ft (40.1 m^{2})
- Airfoil: root: NACA 23018; tip: NACA 3410
- Empty weight: 10,510 lb (4,767 kg)
- Gross weight: 14,500 lb (6,577 kg)
- Powerplant: 1 × Rolls-Royce Griffon 29 V-12 liquid-cooled piston engine, 1,815 hp (1,353 kW)
- Propellers: 6-bladed Rotol contra-rotating propeller, 10 ft 4 in (3.15 m) diameter

Performance

- Maximum speed: 260 mph (420 km/h, 230 kn) at 11,800 ft (3,597 m)
- Cruise speed: 131 mph (211 km/h, 114 kn)
- Range: 875 mi (1,408 km, 760 nmi) at cruise speed
- Service ceiling: 23,700 ft (7,200 m)
- Rate of climb: 1,430 ft/min (7.3 m/s) at 7,000 ft (2,134 m) in MS supercharger gear ratio
- Take-off run from deck: 312 ft (95 m) with 31 mph (27 kn; 50 km/h) wind over deck
