= Stonehenge Air Museum =

Stonehenge Aviation Museum
- Location: Fortine, Montana
- Coordinates: 48.7980°N 114.8887°W
- Type: Aviation Museum
- Key holdings: Mk 47 Seafire
- Collection size: ~two dozen aircraft
- Visitors: reservation required
- Website: stonehengeairmuseum.org

The Stonehenge Air Museum, located near Fortine, Montana, is a 501(c)3 non-profit aviation museum with over two dozen vintage aircraft, including a rare example of an airworthy Mk 47 Seafire.

The Crystal Lakes Resort Airport at the Stonehenge Air Museum is for use by invitation only except in case of an emergency.

== See also ==
- List of aviation museums
