= Supermarine Spitfire variants: specifications, performance and armament =

Spitfire

General information
- Type: Fighter
- Manufacturer: Supermarine
- Designer: R. J. Mitchell
- Primary user: Royal Air Force
- Number built: 20,351

History
- Manufactured: 1938–1948
- Introduction date: 1938
- First flight: 5 March 1936
- Retired: 1955, RAF
- Variants: Seafire, Spiteful

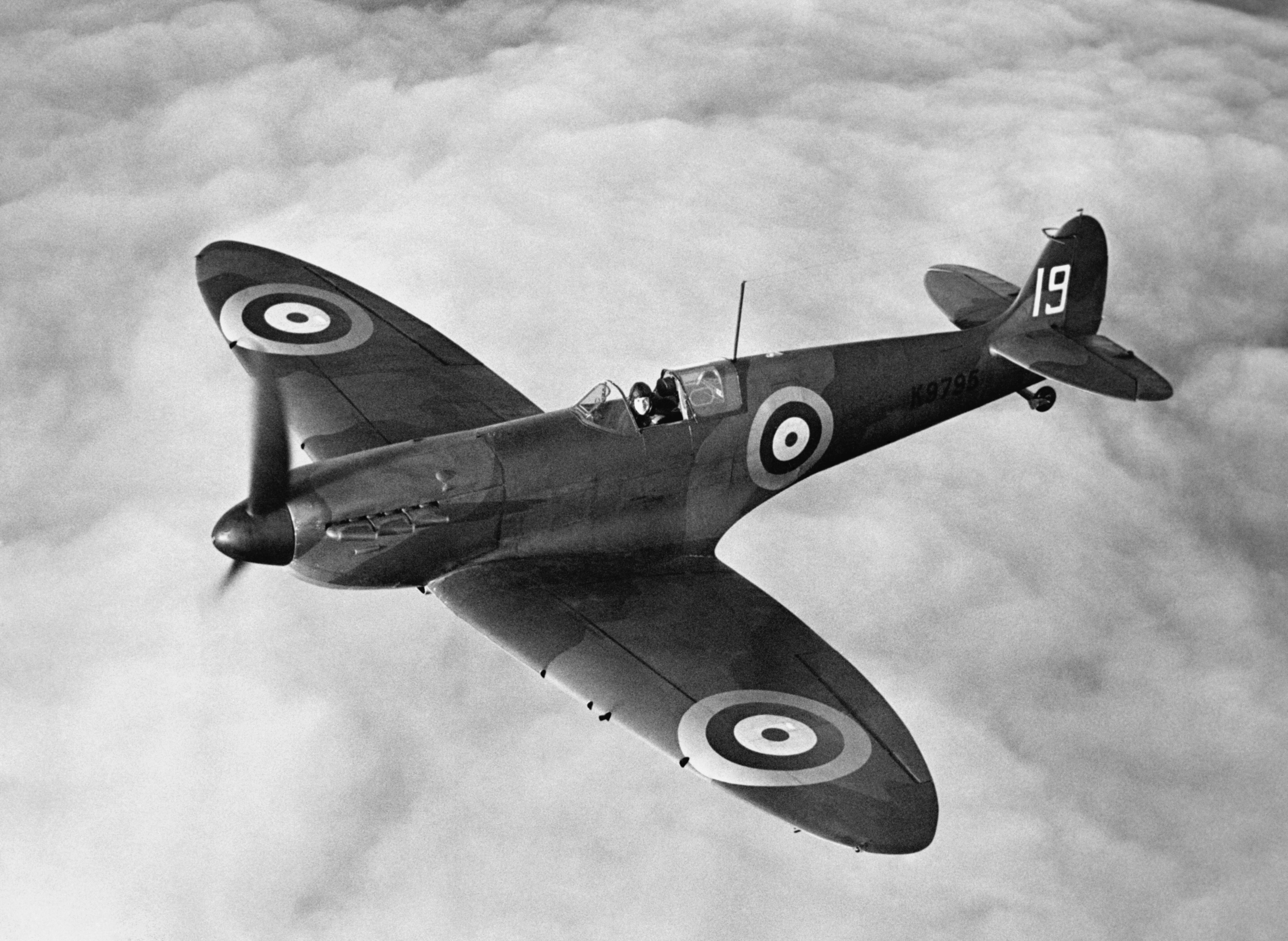
K9795, the 9th production Mk I, with 19 Squadron.

Spitfire LF Mk Vb of 316 (Polish) "Warszawski" Squadron. This Spitfire has the "cropped" Merlin 45 series engine and the "clipped" wings.

The British Supermarine Spitfire was one of the most popular fighter aircraft of the Second World War. The basic airframe proved to be extremely adaptable, capable of taking far more powerful engines and far greater loads than its original role as a short-range interceptor had allowed for. This would lead to 24 marks of Spitfire, and many sub-variants within the marks, being produced throughout the Second World War and beyond, in continuing efforts to fulfill Royal Air Force requirements and successfully combat ever-improving enemy aircraft.

The Spitfire was also adopted for service on aircraft carriers of the Royal Navy; in this role type was redesignated as the Supermarine Seafire. Although the first version of the Seafire, the Seafire Ib, was a straight adaptation of the Spitfire Vb, successive variants incorporated much needed strengthening of the basic structure of the airframe and equipment changes in order to survive the demanding maritime environment. As a result, the later Seafire variants were usually heavier and, in the case of the Seafire XV/XVII and F. 47 series, they were very different aircraft to their land-based counterparts.

It is notable that throughout the entire development process, which took place over twelve years, from 1935 through to 1948, there were no outstanding failures of the basic design.

== The Rolls-Royce Merlin and Griffon engines ==
A key factor which allowed the continued development of the Spitfire was the development of progressively more powerful and improved engines, starting with the Rolls-Royce Merlin and progressing to the bigger and more powerful Rolls-Royce Griffon. The evolution of high octane aviation fuels and improved supercharger designs enabled Rolls-Royce to extract increasing amounts of power from the same basic designs. For example, the Merlin II and III which powered the Spitfire I produced a maximum of 1,030 hp (770 kW) using the 87 octane aviation fuel which was generally available from 1938 through to 1941; from early 1940 increasing supplies of 100 octane fuel allowed the maximum power to be increased to 1,310 hp (977 kW) with an increased supercharger boost pressure, albeit for a maximum time limit of 5 minutes. In 1944 100/150 grade fuels enabled the Merlin 66 to produce 1,860 hp (1,387 kW) at low altitudes in F.S gear.

=== Single stage superchargers ===
Depending on the supercharger fitted, engines were rated as low altitude (e.g.; Merlin 66, Griffon III), where the engine produced its maximum power below about 10,000 feet (3,000 m), medium altitude (Merlin 45), where the engine produced its maximum power up to about 20,000 feet (6,100 m), and high altitude (Merlin 70), where the engine produced its maximum power above about 25,000 feet (7,600 m). As a result, the prefixes which were used on most later Spitfire variants; LF, F, and HF; indicated whether the engines fitted were suited for low, medium or high altitude, respectively. The use of these prefixes did not change according to the wings, which could be fitted with "clipped" tips, reducing the wingspan to about 32 ft 6 in (9.9 m) (this could vary slightly), or the "pointed" tips which increased the wingspan to 40 ft 2 in (12.29 m).

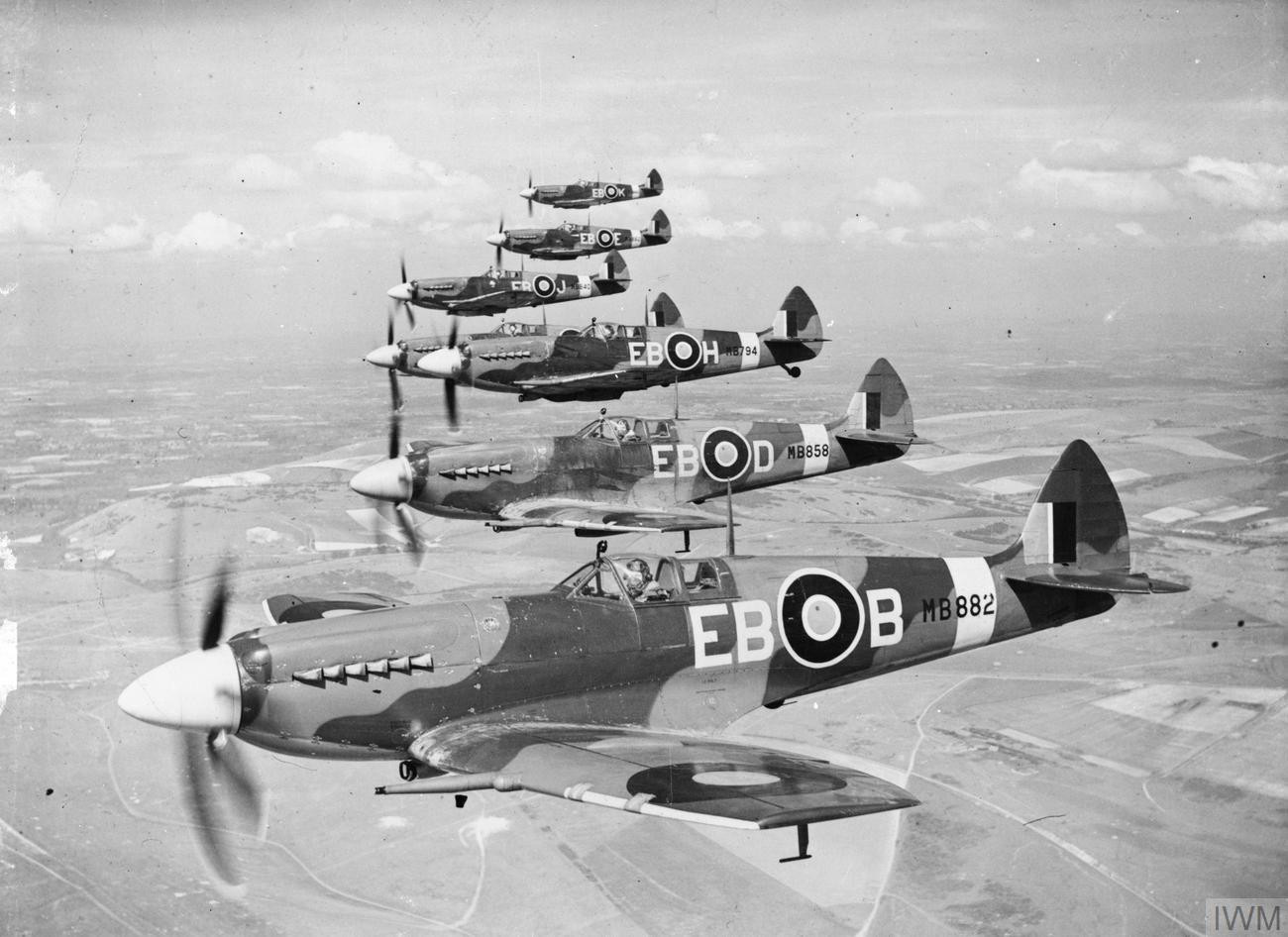
Spitfire F Mk XIIs of 41 Sqn. The Griffon IIs or VIs used a single-stage supercharger generating maximum power at low altitudes. These aircraft have "clipped" wings optimised for low altitude use

The original Merlin and Griffon engine designs used single-stage superchargers. For engines equipped with a single-stage supercharger the air being forced through the supercharger air intake was compressed by the supercharger's impeller. In the case of the Merlin II/III, XII and 40 series as the air was being compressed it was mixed with fuel which was fed through an SU carburettor before being fed into the engine's cylinders. The Merlin III produced 1,030 hp (770 kW) at +6¼lb/in² (43 kPa) of "boost" (the "boost" is the pressure to which the air/fuel mixture is compressed before being fed to the cylinders). The limitation of the single stage supercharger was that the maximum power dropped quickly as higher altitudes were reached; because air pressure and air density decreases with altitude the efficiency of a piston engine drops because of the reduction in the weight of air (Note: The air at higher altitudes weighs less per cubic centimetre than it does at sea-level.) that can be drawn into the engine; for example the air density, at 30,000 feet (9,100 m) is 1/3 of that at sea level, thus only 1/3 of the amount of air can be drawn into the cylinder and only 1/3 of the fuel can be burnt.

A supercharger can be thought of either as artificially increasing the density of the air by compressing it – or as forcing more air than normal into the cylinder every time the piston moves down.

=== Two-Stage, Two-Speed superchargers ===
The most fundamental change made to the later Merlin (60, 70, 80, and 100 series) and Griffon engines (60 and 80 series) was the incorporation of a two-stage, two-speed supercharger, which provided a considerable increase in power, especially at higher altitudes. Two-stage refers to the use of two impellers on a common driveshaft, constituting two superchargers in series. (Note: Impellers were often referred to as "rotors".) As air was drawn through the air intake, fuel was pumped into the airstream by the carburettor. The first-stage impeller compressed the air-fuel mixture and this was then fed to the smaller second-stage impeller which further compressed the mixture.

The impellers were driven by a hydraulically operated two-speed gearbox. At low to medium altitudes, the supercharger was in Moderate Supercharger or M.S. gear (this referred to the gearing and thus the speed, at which the impellers were operating). Once the aircraft reached and climbed through a set critical altitude, (20,000 feet (6,100 m) for the Merlin 61 and 70 series) the power would start to drop as the atmospheric pressure (the density of air) dropped. As the critical altitude was passed a pressure-operated aneroid capsule operated the gearbox, which changed speed to Full Supercharger (F.S.) gear, which drove the impellers faster, thus compressing a greater volume of the air-fuel mixture. (Note: The second stage starting was often accompanied by a noticeable jolt, which inexperienced pilots often mistook for some type of engine malfunction.)

An intercooler was required to stop the compressed mixture from becoming too hot and either igniting before reaching the cylinders (pre-ignition knocking) or creating a condition known as knocking or detonation. The intercooler, which was separate from the engine cooling system, with its own supply of glycol and water coolant, was mounted in the induction system, between the outlet of the second-stage supercharger and behind the cylinder blocks. The hot air-fuel mixture from the supercharger was circulated though and around the coolant tubes and was then passed on to the main induction manifold, through which it was fed into the cylinders. The intercooler also circulated coolant through passages in the supercharger casing and between the impellers. Finally, an extra radiator (mounted in the starboard radiator duct under the wing of the Spitfire) was used to dissipate the intercooler's excess charge heat.

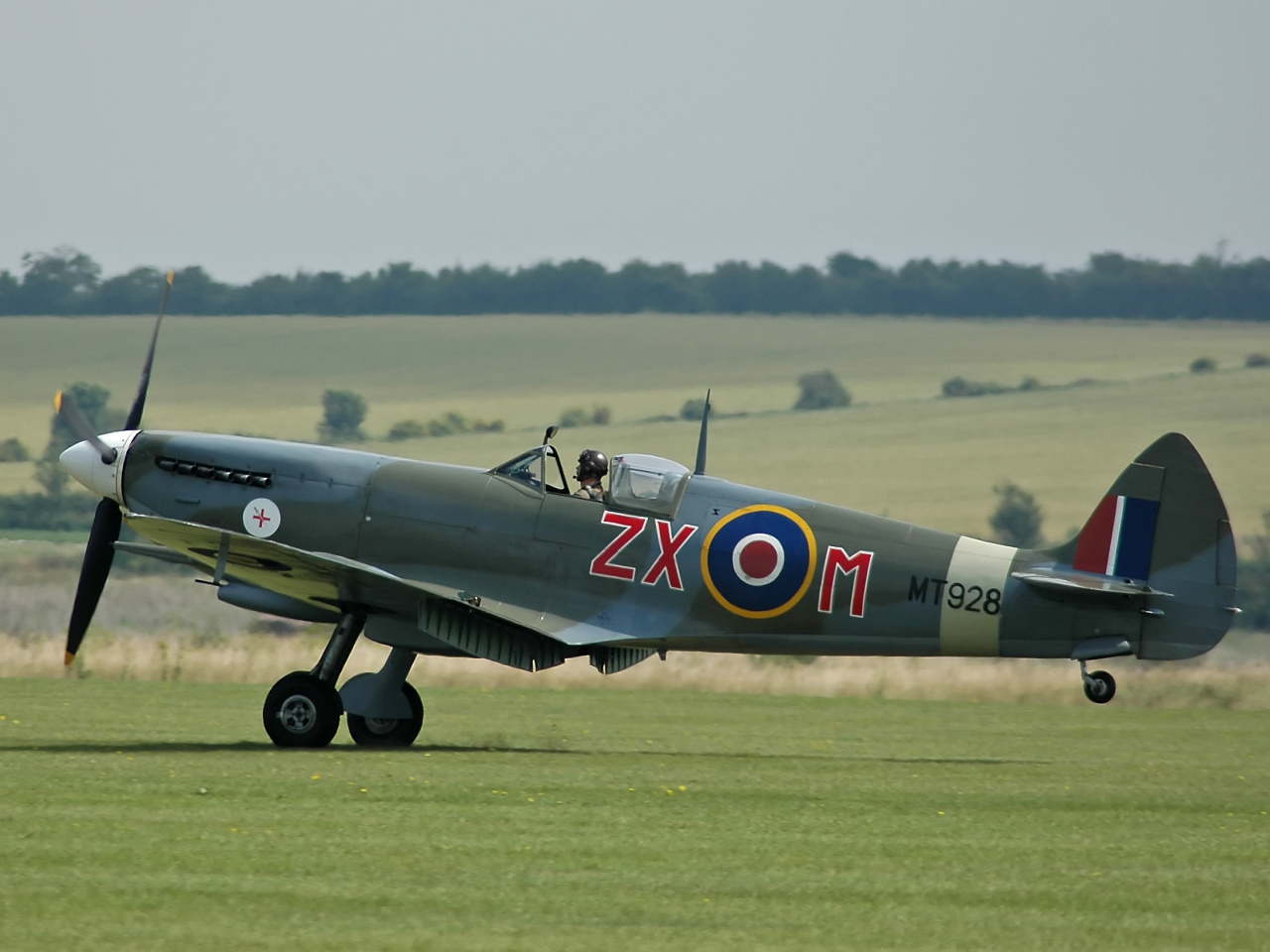
Spitfire Mk VIII. Merlin 63, 66, or 70 engine with a two-stage, two-speed supercharger.

With the two-stage, two-speed supercharger, two sets of power ratings can be quoted. As an example, the maximum power generated by the Merlin 61 was 1,565 hp (1,167 kW) at 12,250 feet (3,730 m) (critical altitude) at M.S. speed, using + 15 lb/in² "boost". The F.S. gear required approximately 200 hp (149 kW) to drive it. As a result, the maximum power generated by the Merlin 61 in F.S. was 1,390 hp (1,036 kW) at 25,900 feet (7,900 m) using + 15 lb/in² of boost. The Merlin 66 used in the LF Mk IX produced slightly more power but because of the use of slightly different gear ratios driving smaller impellers, the critical altitude ratings of the supercharger stages were lower, 7,000 feet (2,100 m) and 18,000 feet (5,500 m) respectively. By contrast the Merlin 70, which was optimised for high-altitude flight, had critical altitudes of 14,000 feet (4,300 m) (M.S) and 25,400 feet (7,700 m) (F.S). (Unlike the Merlin engines the Griffons used superchargers which were designed to achieve maximum performance over a wider altitude band; as such there were no Griffon engined LF or HF Spitfire variants.)

=== Carburettors ===
The original production variants of the Merlin used an SU manufactured carburettor in which the fuel flow was metered through a float. In most circumstances this proved to be sufficient but during the air battles over Dunkirk and during the Battle of Britain it was found that whenever the Merlin was subjected to negative "g" forces, such as a quick "bunt" into a dive, the engine would briefly lose power through petrol starvation. This was because the petrol in the float was being thrown away from the feed pipe to the supercharger. The fuel injected Daimler-Benz DB 601 engine gave the Bf 109 especially an advantage over the carburettor-equipped engine; no Spitfire could simply "bunt" and dive away from an opponent as the 109 could. The remedy, invented by Beatrice "Tilly" Shilling, was to fit a metal diaphragm with a hole in it, across the float chambers. It partly cured the problem of fuel starvation in a dive. The device was commonly referred to as 'Miss Shilling's Orifice'.

The full remedy was to use the Bendix-Stromberg pressure carburettor, which allowed more precise metering of the amount of fuel used by the engine and prevented fuel starvation. This new carburettor was used from the Merlin 66 series and on all Griffon engines. In these engines the carburettor injected fuel at 5 psi through a nozzle direct into the supercharger and the compressed air-fuel mixture was then directed to the cylinders. The final development was the SU injection carburettor, that injected fuel into the supercharger using a fuel pump driven as a function of crankshaft speed and engine pressures; although this was fitted to the 100 series Merlins, which were not used in production Spitfires, it was used in the Griffon 60 and 80 series.

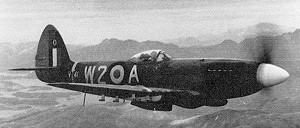
Spitfire F.24 of 80 Squadron. This was the final mark of Spitfire powered by a Griffon 85 driving a five bladed Rotol propeller.

=== Boost pressure measurements ===
The British measured boost pressure as lbs./sq.inch (or psi) above a nominal value of atmospheric pressure at sea level. A reading of +6 meant that the air/fuel mix was being compressed by a supercharger blower to 20.7 (rounded figure) psi before entering the engine; +25 meant that the air/fuel mix was being compressed to 39.7 psi – 14.7 psi atmospheric pressure added to the "boost" pressure of 25 psi.

| Inches of Mercury (" Hg) | Pounds of Boost |
| 80.9" of mercury= | +25 lb boost |
| 66.6" of mercury= | +18 lb boost |
| 60.5" of mercury= | +15 lb boost |
| 48.3" of mercury= | +9 lb boost |
| 42.2" of mercury= | +6 lb boost |

=== Ram jet assistance ===
In an attempt to boost the performance of the Spitfire Mk1 in May 1940, RAe scientists (including Hayne Constant) developed a 'propulsive duct'. This was in essence a simple ram jet, fed by petrol, utilising the Meredith effect. It was housed in a 48-by-30-by-15-inch (122 cm × 76 cm × 38 cm) deep duct mounted on the fuselage centre line and resembled a third radiator. Bench tests showed that the increase in speed was not significant and the device was not flight tested. In 1943 the idea was reconsidered as a counter to the threat of the V1. Aircraft such as the Hawker Tempest and Gloster Meteor were not widely available and the Spitfire would only be able to intercept in a diving attack. A. D. Baxter and C. W. R. Smith at Farnborough reviewed the 1940 work and concluded that it was practical but problems with drag and pressure loss were encountered and the V1 had been beaten before they were solved.

== Dimensions, performance and armament ==
Due to the many differences in production Spitfires, performance could vary widely, even between aircraft with the same Mark number. Factors such as weight, external fittings, airframe and engine condition, among others, influenced how an aircraft performed. For example, even relatively minor damage on the wing leading edges could drastically reduce top speed. The most reliable performance figures and weight measurements came from the tests carried out throughout the Second World War by the Aeroplane & Armament Experimental Establishment (A&AEE) based at Boscombe Down.

=== Early Merlin engines ===
Supermarine Spitfire- Merlin engine variants
| | Mk Ia (K9793-early production, de Havilland two speed propeller) | Mk IIa (P7280) | Mk Vb (W3134) | LF Mk Vb (W3228) (Note: W3228 was tested with normal span wings. Most LF Mk Vbs used "clipped" wings) | Mk VI (AB200) |
| Wingspan | 36 ft 10 in (11.23 m) | 36 ft 10 in (11.23 m) | 36 ft 10 in (11.23 m) | 32 ft 10 in (10.01 m) | 40 ft 2 in (12.24 m) |
| Wing area | 242.1 ft^{2} (22.5 m^{2}) | 242.1 ft^{2} (22.5 m^{2}) | 242.1 ft^{2} (22.5 m^{2}) | 231 ft^{2} (21.46 m^{2}) | 248.5 ft^{2} (23.1 m^{2}) |
| Length | 29 ft 11 in (9.12 m) | 29 ft 11 in (9.12 m) | 29 ft 11 in (9.12 m) | 29 ft 11 in (9.12 m) | 29 ft 11 in (9.12 m) |
| Height | 9 ft 10 in (3.02 m) | 9 ft 10 in (3.02 m) | 11 ft 5 in (3.48 m) | 11 ft 5 in (3.48 m) | 11 ft 5 in (3.48 m) |
| Empty weight | 4,306 lb (1,953 kg) | 4,541 lb (2,059 kg) | 4,963 lb (2,251 kg) | 4,963 lb (2,251 kg) | |
| Loaded weight | 5,935 lb (2,692 kg) | 6,172 lb (2,799 kg) | 6,525 lb (3,071 kg) | 6,450 lb (2,925 kg) | 6,740 lb (3,057 kg) |
| Engine | Rolls-Royce Merlin III | Rolls-Royce Merlin XII | Rolls-Royce Merlin 45 | Rolls-Royce Merlin 50M | Rolls-Royce Merlin 47 |
| Power | 1,030 hp (770 kW) at 16,000 ft (4,877 m) 87 Octane fuel, +6 lb/in² boost (Note: Using 100 Octane fuel and +12 lb/in² boost the Merlin III was capable of generating 1,310 hp (977 kW). Harvey-Bailey 1995, p. 155. This overboost condition was sustainable for five minutes and was in use from March 1940. This boosted the maximum speed by 25 mph (40 km/h) at sea level and 34 mph (55 km/h) at 10,000 ft (3,000 m) and improved the climbing performance between sea level and full throttle height. Price 1996, p. 19..) | 1,135 hp (846 kW) at 12,250 ft (3,734 m) 100 Octane fuel, +9 pounds lb/in² boost | 1,470 hp (1,096 kW) at 11,000 ft (3,353 m) | 1,585 hp (1,181 kW) at 3,800 ft (1,158 m) | 1,415 hp (1,054 kW) at 14,000 ft (4,267 m) |
| Maximum speed | 367 mph (582 km/h) at 18,600 ft (5,669 m) | 354 mph (570 km/h) at 17,550 ft (5,349 m) | 371 mph (597 km/h) at 20,000 ft (6,096 m) | 350.5 mph (564 km/h) at 5,900 ft (1,798 m) | 354 mph (570 km/h) at 17,400 ft (5,349 m) |
| Rate of climb | 2,175 ft/min (11.0 m/s) at 9,700 ft (2,956 m) | 2,995 ft/min (15.3 m/s) at 10,000 ft (3,962 m) | 3,250 ft/min (16.5 m/s) at 15,000 ft (4,572 m) | 4,720 ft/min (24.0 m/s) at sea level | 2660 ft/min (13.5 m/s) at 28,000 ft (8,534 m) |
| Service ceiling (Note: Note:The Service Ceiling in these reports denotes the altitude at which the rate of climb is reduced to 100 ft/min.) | 34,400 ft (10,485 m) | 37,600 ft (11,460 m) | 35,000 ft (10,668 m) | 35,700 ft (10,881 m) | 39,200 ft (11,948 m) |
| Wing loading | 24.5 lb/ft^{2} (117 kg/m^{2}) | 25.4 lb/ft^{2} (122 kg/m^{2}) | 27.9 lb/ft^{2} (137 kg/m^{2}) | 26.6 lb/ft^{2} (130 kg/m^{2}) | 27.0 lb/ft^{2} (137 kg/m^{2}) |
| Power/mass | 0.17 hp/lb (0.28 kW/kg) | 0.18 hp/lb (0.30 kW/kg) | 0.22 hp/lb (0.36 kW/kg) | 0.21 hp/lb (0.35 kW/kg) | 0.21 hp/lb (0.35 kW/kg) |
| Combat range | 248 mi (400 km) on internal fuel | 248 mi (400 km) on internal fuel | 248 mi (400 km) on internal fuel | 248 mi (400 km) on internal fuel | 248 mi (400 km) on internal fuel |
| Ferry range | | | 1,135 mi (1,827 km) | | 1,530 mi (2,462 km) with 170 Imp gal (204 US gal) drop tank |
| Armament | 8 × 0.303" Browning machine guns; 350 rpg | 8 × 0.303" Browning machine guns; 350 rpg | 2 × 20 mm (0.79 in) Hispano II cannon; 60 round drum; 4 × 0.303" Browning machine guns; 350 rpg; 2 × 250 lb (113 kg) or 1 × 500 lb (227 kg) bombs | 2 × 20 mm (0.79 in) Hispano II cannon; 60 round drum; 4 × 0.303" Browning machine guns; 350 rpg; 2 × 250 lb (113 kg) or 1 × 500 lb (227 kg) bombs | 2 × 20 mm (0.79 in) Hispano II cannon; 60 round drum; 4 × 0.303" Browning machine guns; 350 rpg |

=== Late Merlin and Griffon ===
Supermarine Spitfire- Late Merlin and Griffon engine variants.
| | LF Mk IXe | Mk XII | Mk XIVe | F Mk 24 |
|---|---|---|---|---|
| Wingspan | 32 ft 6 in (9.9 m) | 32 ft 6 in (9.9 m) | 36 ft 10 in (11.23 m) | 36 ft 11 in (11.25 m) |
| Wing area | 231 ft^{2} (21.46 m^{2}) | 231 ft^{2} (21.46 m^{2}) | 242.1 ft^{2} (22.5 m^{2}) | 243.6 ft^{2} (23.6 m^{2}) |
| Length | 31 ft 1 in (9.47 m) | 31 ft 7 in (9.62 m) | 32 ft 8 in (9.95 m) | 32 ft 11 in (10.03 m) |
| Height | 12 ft 8 in (3.86 m) | 12 ft 8 in (3.86 m) | 12 ft 9 in (3.89 m) | 13 ft 6 in (4.11 m) |
| Empty weight | 5,090 lb (2,309 kg) | 5,564 lb (2,524 kg) | 6,653 lb (3,034 kg) | 7,160 lb (3,247 kg) |
| Loaded weight | 7,400 lb (3,354 kg) | 7,415 lb (3,363 kg) | 8,574 lb (3,889 kg) | 9,900 lb (4,490 kg) |
| Engine | Rolls-Royce Merlin 66: 150 Octane fuel, +25 lb/in² boost. | Rolls-Royce Griffon III or IV | Rolls-Royce Griffon 65 | Rolls-Royce Griffon 85 |
| Power | 1,720 hp (1,283 kW) at 11,000 ft (3,353 m) | 1,735 hp (1,293 kW) at 1,000 ft (300 m) | 2,050 hp (1,530 kW) at 9,800 ft (2,987 m) | 2,120 hp (1,771 kW) at 12,250 ft (3,734 m) |
| Maximum speed | 404 mph (650 km/h) at 21,000 ft (6,400 m) | 397 mph (639 km/h) at 17,800 ft (5,425 m) | 449 mph (722 km/h) at 24,500 ft (7,468 m) | 454 mph (731 km/h) at 26,000 ft (7,802 m) |
| Rate of climb | 4,745 ft/min (24.1 m/s) at 10,000 ft (3,048 m) | 3,760 ft/min (19.1 m/s) at 2,000 ft (609 m) | 4,700 ft/min (23.8 m/s) at 8,000 ft (2438 m) | 4,100 ft/min (21.0 m/s) at 17,000 ft (5,182 m) |
| Service ceiling | 42,500 ft (12,954 m) | 39,000 ft (11,887 m) | 43,000 ft (13,560 m) | 43,000 ft (13,560 m) |
| Wing loading | 30.6 lb/ft^{2} (149 kg/m^{2}) | 32.0 lb/ft^{2} (155 kg/m^{2}) | 35.0 lb/ft^{2} (171 kg/m^{2}) | 40.6 lb/ft^{2} (198 kg/m^{2}) |
| Power/mass | 0.23 hp/lb (0.39 kW/kg) | 0.23 hp/lb (0.39 kW/kg) | 0.20 hp/lb (0.33 kW/kg) | 0.23 hp/lb (0.39 kW/kg) |
| Combat range | 248 mi (400 km) on internal fuel | 493 mi (793 km) on internal fuel | 460 mi (740 km) on internal fuel | 390 mi (627 km) on internal fuel |
| Ferry range | 980 mi (1,577 km) | 791 mi (1,272 km) | 855 mi (1,375 km) | 965 mi (1,553 km) 90 gal drop tank |
| Armament | 2 × 20 mm Hispano II cannon; 120 rpg; 2 × 0.50 in Browning M2 machine guns; 250 rpg or 4 x 0.303; 1400 rounds for the IXc; Up to 2 × 250 lb (110 kg) bombs (wing racks), plus 1 × 500 lb (230 kg) bomb (centre-section rack). | 2 × 20 mm Hispano II cannon; 120 rpg; 4 × .303 in Browning machine guns; 350 rpg; Up to 2 × 250 lb (110 kg) bombs (wing racks), plus 1 × 500 lb (230 kg) bomb (centre-section rack). | 2 × 20 mm Hispano II cannon; 120 rpg; 2 × 0.50 in Browning M2 machine guns; 250 rpg | 4 × 20 mm Hispano V cannon; 175 rpg inboard, 150 rpg outboard; Up to 2 × 250 lb (110 kg) bombs (wing racks), plus 1 × 500 lb (230 kg) bomb (centre-section rack). |

=== Seafire ===
Supermarine Seafire
| | Seafire Mk IIc | Seafire L Mk III | Seafire F Mk XV | Seafire F Mk 47 |
|---|---|---|---|---|
| Wingspan | 36 ft 10 in (11.23 m) | 32 ft 2 in (9.8 m)/ 13 ft 4 in (4.0 m) (wings folded) | 36 ft 10 in (11.23 m)/ 13 ft 4 in (4.0 m) (wings folded) | 36 ft 11 in (11.25 m)/ 19 ft 1 in (5.82 m) (wings folded) |
| Wing area | 242.1 ft^{2} (22.5 m^{2}) | 231 ft^{2} (21.5 m^{2}) | 242.1 ft^{2} (22.5 m^{2}) | 243.6 ft^{2} (23.6 m^{2}) |
| Length | 29 ft 11 in (9.12 m) | 29 ft 11 in (9.12 m) | 31 ft 10 in (9.70 m)/ 32 ft 3 in (9.83 m)(late production larger fin and rudder) | 34 ft 4 in (10.46 m) |
| Height (Over propeller, tail down) | 11 ft 5 in (3.48 m) | 11 ft 5 in (3.48 m) | 12 ft 8 in (3.86 m) | 12 ft 9 in (3.88 m) |
| Empty weight | 5,300 lb (2,404 kg) | 5,450 lb (2,472 kg) | 6,300 lb (2,857 kg) | 8,680 lb (3,937 kg) |
| Loaded weight | 7,145 lb (3,240 kg) | 7,220 lb (3,275 kg) | 7,995 lb (3,626 kg) | 10,700 lb (4,853 kg) loaded, clean; 12,530 lb (5,683 kg) with 50 gal drop tank and two 500 lb (230 kg) bombs |
| Engine | Rolls-Royce Merlin 46 | Rolls-Royce Merlin 55M | Rolls-Royce Griffon VI | Rolls-Royce Griffon 88 |
| Power | 1,415 hp (1,055 kW) at 14,000 ft (4,267 m) | 1,585 hp (1,182 kW) at 2,750 ft (838 m) | 1,850 hp (1,379 kW) at 2,000 ft (609 m) | 2,350 hp (1,752 kW) at 1,250 ft (380 m) |
| Maximum speed | 345 mph (299.7 knots), (555 km/h) at 19,000 ft (5,791 m) | 359 mph (312 knots), (578 km/h) at 5,100 ft (1,514 m) | 392 mph (341 knots), (631 km/h) at 12,800 ft (3,901 m) | 452 mph (393 knots), (727 km/h) at 20,500 ft (6,250 m) |
| Rate of climb | 2,380 ft/min (12.0 m/s) at 16,000 ft (4,876 m) | 3,460 ft/min (17.5 m/s) at 4,000 ft (1,219 m) | 4,600 ft/min (23.4 m/s) at 4,000 ft (1,219 m) | 4,800 ft/min (24.4 m/s) at sea level (0 m) |
| Service ceiling | 37,600 ft (11,460 m) | 32,000 ft (9,753 m) | 37,000 ft (11,277 m) | 43,100 ft (13,135 m) |
| Wing loading | 29.5 lb/ft^{2} (133 kg/m^{2}) | 30.3 lb/ft^{2} (137 kg/m^{2}) | 33.0 lb/ft^{2} (161 kg/m^{2}) | 43.9 lb/ft^{2} (205 kg/m^{2}) or 51.4 lb/ft^{2} (240 kg/m^{2}) |
| Power/mass | 0.20 hp/lb (0.33 kW/kg) | 0.22 hp/lb (0.36 kW/kg) | 0.23 hp/lb (0.39 kW/kg) | 0.22 hp/lb (0.36 kW/kg) 0.18 hp/lb (0.30 kW/kg) |
| Combat range | 434 mi (698 km) on internal fuel | 510 mi (821 km) on internal fuel | 376 mi (605 km) on internal fuel | 405 mi (652 km) on internal fuel |
| Ferry range | 750 mi (1,207 km) with 60 gal drop tank | 770 mi (1,239 km) with 60 gal drop tank | 903 mi (1,453 km) with 90 gal drop tank | 1,475 mi (2,374 km) with 90 gal drop tank |
| Armament | 2 × 20 mm Hispano II cannon; 120 rpg; 4 × .303 in Browning machine guns; 350 rpg; 2 × 250 lb (110 kg) with 1 × 500 lb (230 kg) bomb | 2 × 20 mm Hispano II: late Seafire IIIs Hispano V cannon; 120 rpg; 4 × .303 in Browning machine guns; 350 rpg; 2 × 250 lb (110 kg) with 1 × 500 lb (230 kg) bomb | 2 × 20 mm Hispano II cannon; 120 rpg; 4 × .303 in Browning machine guns; 350 rpg; 2 × 250 lb (110 kg) with 1 × 500 lb (230 kg) bomb | 4 × 20 mm Hispano V cannon; 175 rpg inboard, 150 rpg outboard; up to 8 × "60 lb" RP-3 rockets on zero-length launchers; up to 3 × 500 lb (230 kg) bombs |
