= Supermarine Seafire =

British carrier-based fighter aircraft

Seafire
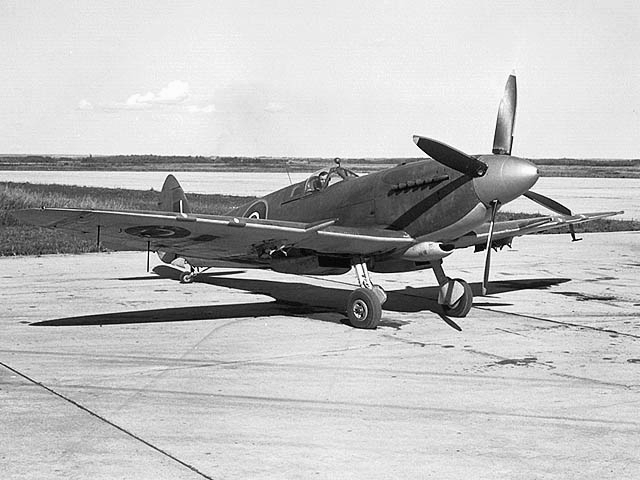
- Royal Canadian Navy Seafire F.XV

General information
- Type: Carrier-based fighter
- National origin: United Kingdom
- Manufacturer: Supermarine
- Primary users: Royal Navy French Navy; Irish Air Corps; Royal Canadian Navy
- Number built: 2,646

History
- Introduction date: 1942
- First flight: 7 January 1942
- Retired: 1950s
- Developed from: Supermarine Spitfire

The Supermarine Seafire is a naval version of the Supermarine Spitfire fighter adapted for operation from aircraft carriers. It was analogous in concept to the Hawker Sea Hurricane, a navalised version of the Spitfire's stablemate, the Hawker Hurricane. The name Seafire was derived from the contraction of the full name of Sea Spitfire.

A carrier-capable version of the Supermarine Spitfire had been proposed by the Admiralty in May 1938. Despite a pressing need to replace various obsolete types in the Fleet Air Arm (FAA), some opposed the idea, including Winston Churchill, although these disputes were often a result of the overriding priority for land-based Spitfires, instead. During 1941 and early 1942, the Admiralty again requested naval Spitfires, resulting in an initial batch of Seafire Mk.Ib fighters in late 1941, which were mainly used to gain experience operating the type. Concerns arose over weak undercarriages, which had not been strengthened to naval standards, but performance was acceptable.

From 1942 on, further Seafire models were ordered, including the first operationally viable Seafire F Mk.III variant. This led to widespread use with the FAA. In November 1942, the first Seafire combat occurred during Operation Torch, the Allied landings in North Africa. In July 1943, the Seafire provided air cover for the Allied invasion of Sicily, and again in September 1943 during the Allied invasion of Italy. During 1944, large numbers provided air support to ground forces during the Normandy landings and Operation Dragoon in southern France. During the latter half of 1944, the Seafire joined the British Pacific Fleet, where it intercepted kamikaze attacks, which had become common during the final years of the Pacific War.

The Seafire continued to be used after the end of the war, but the FAA withdrew all its Merlin-powered Seafires and replaced them with Griffon-powered counterparts. The type saw further combat use during the Korean War, in which FAA Seafires performed hundreds of missions in the ground-attack and combat air-patrol roles against North Korean forces in 1950. The Seafire was withdrawn from service during the 1950s. In FAA service, the type had been replaced by the Hawker Sea Fury, the last piston-engined fighter to be used by the service, along with the first generation of jet-propelled naval fighters, such as the de Havilland Sea Vampire, Supermarine Attacker, and Hawker Sea Hawk.

== Development ==
=== Origins ===
The Admiralty first showed an interest in the idea of a carrier-borne Spitfire in May 1938, when during a meeting with Richard Fairey (of Fairey Aviation), Fairey proposed that his company could design and build such an aircraft. The idea met with a negative response and the matter was dropped. As a result, the Fleet Air Arm (FAA), at that point still part of the Royal Air Force, was forced into having to order Blackburn Rocs and Gloster Sea Gladiators, both of which proved to be woefully inadequate in their role. Upon the outbreak of the Second World War, many of the aircraft operated by the FAA had been designed on the assumption that with Germany possessing no aircraft carriers, overall performance was to be of a secondary nature compared to the other duties required, such as observation and spotting, but by 1941, these aircraft had become obsolete in comparison to the German and Italian land-based fighters against which they were occasionally required to operate; thus, the need for more capable aircraft became apparent. As the Hawker Hurricane had quickly proven to be adaptable to carrier-based operations, considerable interest arose in navalising the Spitfire, as well.

The matter of a seaborne Spitfire was raised again in November 1939, when the Air Ministry allowed a Commander Ermen to fly a Spitfire I. After his first flight in R6718, Ermen soon learned that Joseph Smith, chief designer at Supermarine, had been instructed to fit an "A-frame" arrestor hook on a Spitfire and that this had flown on 16 October; a drawing of this aircraft had been shown to the FAA on 27 October. After further discussions, Supermarine submitted a drawing of a Spitfire with folding wings and an arrestor hook. In this case, the wings had been designed with a fold just outboard of the undercarriage bays; as such, the outer wings would have swivelled and folded backwards to face parallel with the fuselage. On 29 February 1940, the Admiralty requested that the Air Ministry formally sanction the production of 50 folding-wing Spitfires, the first of which was to be delivered in July that year. For various reasons, Winston Churchill, who was First Lord of the Admiralty, cancelled the order, writing to Lord Beaverbrook: "I regard it as of very great importance that the production of Fulmars should be kept going".

At a time of considerable demand for land-based Spitfires, due to the Fall of France and the subsequent Battle of Britain, the diversion of resources to facilitate the development and manufacture of a naval variant would have naturally reduced Spitfire production. To cover the gap partially until the Fulmar's replacement (Specification N.5/40 – which would be the Fairey Firefly) was able to enter service, a number of Grumman Wildcats were orderd from America to equip the FAA, instead. These aircraft entered service towards the end of 1940 as the Martlet.

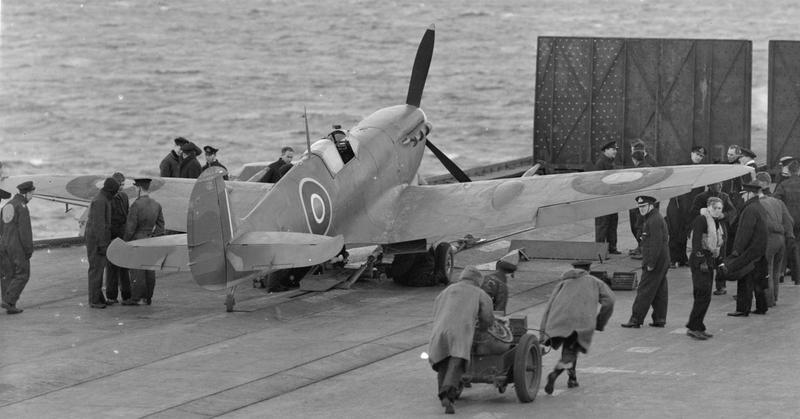
Seafire during FAA trials aboard HMS Victorious, 23–25 September 1942

During late 1941 and early 1942, the Admiralty again assessed the Spitfire for possible conversion. In late 1941, 48 Spitfire Mk.Vb were converted by Air Training Service Ltd. at Hamble to become "hooked Spitfires". This was the Seafire Mk.Ib and would be the first of several Seafire variants to reach the FAA. This version of the Seafire was mainly used to allow the Royal Navy to gain experience in operating the Spitfire on aircraft carriers. The main structural change was made to the lower rear fuselage, which incorporated an A-frame-style arrestor hook and strengthened lower longerons. The fuselage, especially around hatches, was soon found to be too weak for carrier operations. In an attempt to alleviate this condition, reinforcing strips were riveted around hatch openings and along the main fuselage longerons.

A further 118 Seafire Mk.Ibs incorporating the fuselage reinforcements were modified from Spitfire Vbs by Cunliffe-Owen at Eastleigh and Air Training Service. These aircraft were equipped with Naval high-frequency radio equipment and identification, friend or foe equipment, as well as a Type 72 homing beacon. In these and all subsequent Seafires, the instruments were recalibrated to read kn and nmi rather than mph and mi. The fixed armament was the same as that of the Spitfire Vb; two 20 mm (0.79 in) Hispano Mk.II cannons with 60 rounds fed from a "drum" magazine and four .303 in (7.70 mm) Browning machine guns with 350 rounds. Provision was also made to carry a 30 imp gal (140 L) "slipper" fuel tank under the fuselage. In June 1942, the first deliveries of the Seafire took place to 807 Squadron. Another front-line unit, 801 Squadron, operated this version on board HMS Furious from October 1942 through to September 1944.

=== Further development ===
The second seminaval variant of the Seafire and the first to be built as such was the Seafire F Mk.IIc, which was based on the Spitfire Vc. The Vc had several refinements over the Spitfire Vb. Apart from the modifications included in the main batch of Seafire Ibs, this version incorporated catapult spools and a single slinging lug on either side of the fuselage, just behind the engine bulkhead. Three subtypes were produced, the F Mk.IIc and FR Mk.IIc (fighter reconnaissance), powered by a Merlin 46, and the L Mk.IIc powered by a low-altitude Merlin 32 specifically manufactured for naval use. This version of the Merlin used a "cropped" supercharger impellor to provide greater power at low altitudes than the standard engines, delivering 1,585 hp (1,182 kW) at 2,750 ft (840 m). Both engines drove a four-bladed, 10 ft 9 in (3.28 m) diameter Rotol propeller. Because this version used the "C" wing, the Hispano cannons were fed from a 120-round belt magazine; otherwise, the armament was the same as that of the Ib; the FR also carried two F24 cameras. After trials of rocket-assisted take-off gear (RATOG - small, solid-fuel rocket motors which could be attached to the fuselage or wings of aircraft to help shorten the take-off run) in February 1943, this equipment became a standard fitting available for all Seafires, but many FAA pilots rarely used RATOG, in part it was seldom needed and the risks posed by asymmetric ignition.

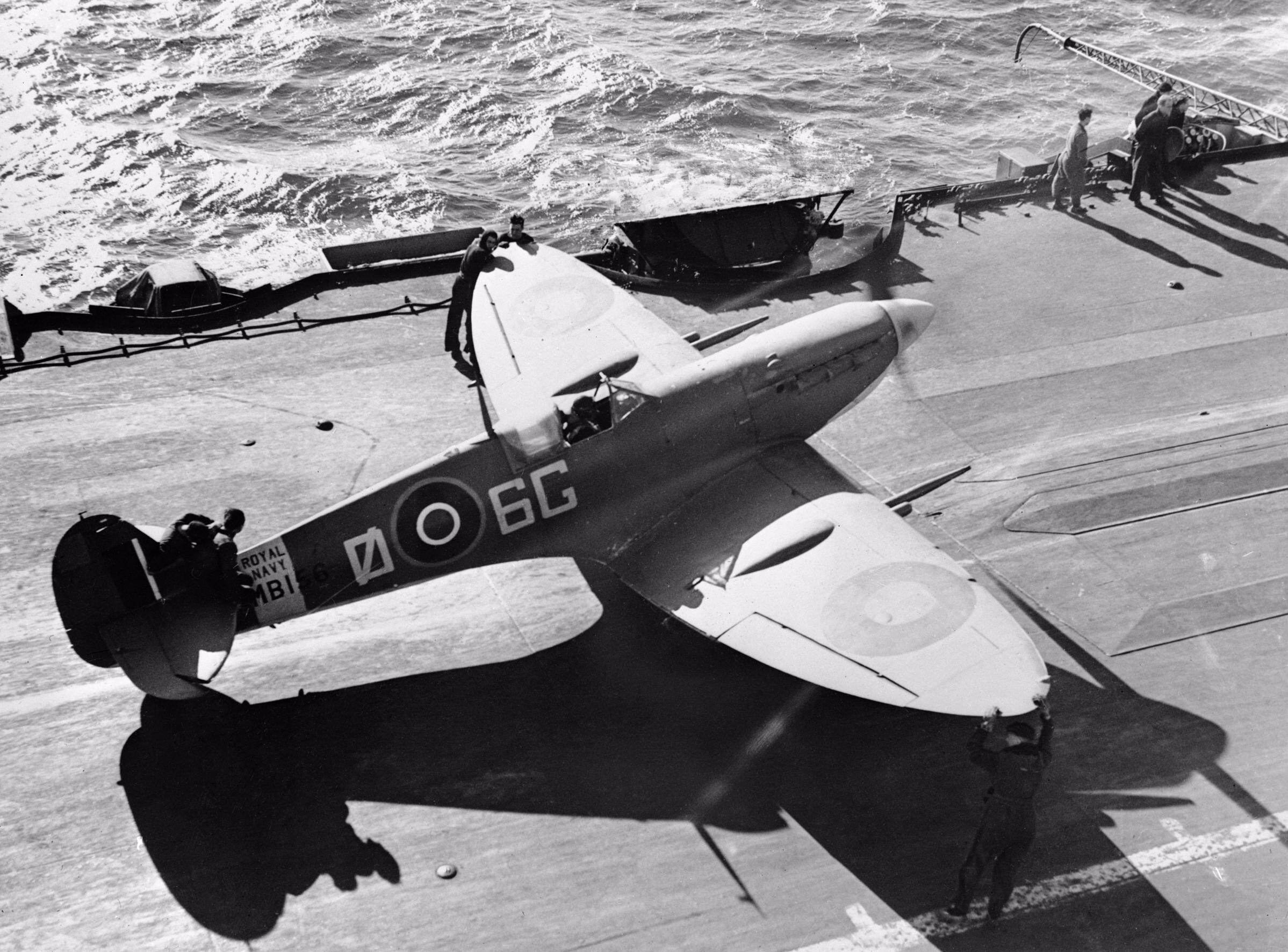
Seafire Mk.IIc on the flight deck of HMS Formidable, December 1942

The IIc model was the first of the Seafires to be deployed operationally in large numbers. Supermarine constructed 262 of this model and a further 110 were built by Westland, (Note: Westland Aircraft Ltd, better known as Westland.) which also built 30 of the Seafire Mk.III (Hybrid) (Mk.IIIs without folding wings). (Note: In addition to building Seafires, Westland also carried out most of the design work.) Although developed for carrier use, this version still lacked the folding wings needed to allow them to be used on board some Royal Navy carriers, some of which had small aircraft elevators unable to accommodate the full wingspan of the Seafires.

The Seafire F Mk.III was the first true carrier adaptation of the Spitfire design. It was developed from the Seafire Mk.IIc, but incorporated manually folding wings, thus allowing more of them to be spotted on deck or in the hangars below. Supermarine devised a system of two straight, chordwise folds; a break was introduced immediately outboard of the wheel wells from which the wing hinged upwards and slightly angled towards the fuselage. A second hinge at each wingtip join allowed the tips to fold down (when the wings were folded the wingtips were folded outwards). This version used the more powerful Merlin 55 (F Mk.III and FR Mk.III) or Merlin 55M (L Mk.III), driving the same four-bladed propeller unit used by the IIc series; the Merlin 55M was another version of the Merlin for maximum performance at low altitude. Other modifications made on the Spitfire made their way to the Seafire, as well, including a slim Aero-Vee air filter and six-stack ejector-type exhausts. The shorter-barrelled, lightweight Hispano Mk.V cannons were introduced during production, as were overload fuel tank fittings in the wings. This Mark was built in larger numbers than any other Seafire variant; of the 1,220 manufactured, Westland built 870 and Cunliffe Owen built 350. In 1947, 12 Mk.IIIs were stripped of their naval equipment by Supermarine and delivered to the Irish Air Corps.

After the Mk.III series, the next Seafire variant to appear was the Seafire F Mk.XV, which was powered by a Griffon VI – single-stage supercharger, rated at 1,850 hp (1,380 kW) at 2,000 ft (610 m) driving a 10 ft 5 in (3.18 m) Rotol propeller. Designed in response to Specification N.4/43, this appeared to be a naval Spitfire F Mk.XII; in reality, the Mk.XV was an amalgamation of a strengthened Seafire III airframe and wings with the wing fuel tanks, retractable tailwheel, larger elevators, and broad-chord "pointed" rudder of the Spitfire VIII. The engine cowling was different from that of the Spitfire XII series, being secured with a larger number of fasteners and lacking the acorn-shaped blister behind the spinner. The final 30 Mk.XVs were built with the blown "teardrop" cockpit canopy and cut-down rear fuselage introduced on the Spitfire Mk.XVI. On the first 50 aircraft manufactured by Cunliffe-Owen, a heavier, strengthened A-frame arrestor hook was fitted to cope with the greater weight. On subsequent Mk.XVs, a new form of "sting" type arrestor hook was used; this version was attached to the reinforced rudder post at the rear of the fuselage and was housed in a fairing below the base of the shortened rudder. A V-shaped guard forward of the tailwheel prevented arrestor wires getting tangled up with the tailwheel. Some 390 Seafire XVs were built by Cunliffe-Owen and Westland from late 1944. Six prototypes had been built by Supermarine.

One problem to surface immediately was the poor deck behaviour of this mark, especially on take-off. At full power, the slipstream of the propeller, which swung to the left (as opposed to the Merlin, which swung to the right), often forced the Seafire to swing to starboard, even with the rudder hard over on opposite lock. This sometimes led to a collision with the carrier's island. The undercarriage oleo legs were still the same as those of the much lighter Merlin-engined Spitfires, meaning that the swing was often accompanied by a series of hops. As an interim measure, pilots were recommended to avoid using full power on take-off (+10 lb (4.5 kg) "boost" maximum was recommended). Another problem involved was this swing being strongly accentuated in the event of an asymmetric firing of the RATOG equipment. In that event, none of the "first-generation" Griffon-engined Seafires were to use RATOG at sea unless they were ranged forward of the first crash barrier on deck.

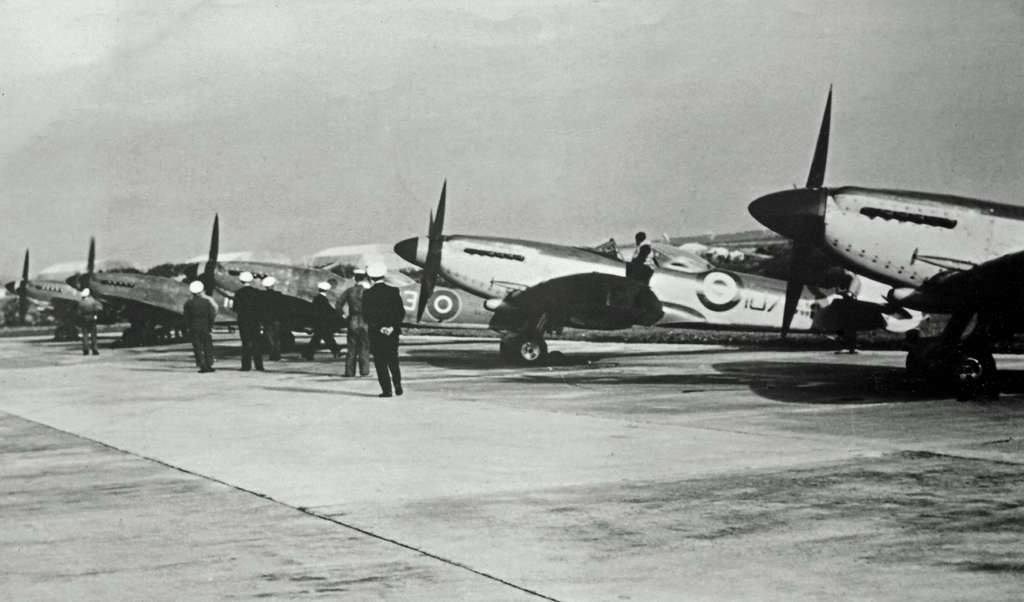
Operational Seafire F Mk.XVIIs of No. 1831 Squadron RNVR at RNAS Stretton in 1950

The Seafire F Mk.XVII was a modified Mk.XV; the most important change was the reinforced main undercarriage, which used longer oleos and a lower rebound ratio. This went some way towards taming the deck behaviour of the Mk.XV, reduced the propensity of the propeller tips "pecking" the deck during an arrested landing, and the softer oleos stopped the aircraft from occasionally bouncing over the arrestor wires and into the crash barrier. Most production XVIIs had the cut-down rear fuselage and teardrop canopy (the windscreen was modified to a rounded section, with narrow quarter windows, rather than the flat windscreen used on Spitfires) and an extra 33-gallon fuel tank fitted in the rear fuselage. The wings were reinforced, with a stronger mainspar necessitated by the new undercarriage, and they were able to carry heavier underwing loads than previous Seafire variants. 232 of this variant were built by Westland (212) and Cunliffe-Owen(20).

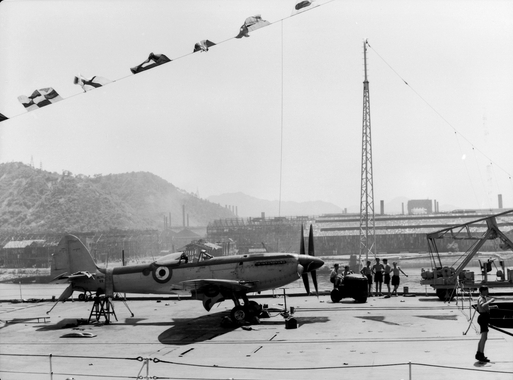
Seafire F Mk.47 on board HMS Unicorn, Japan, 1950

The Seafire F Mk.45 and FR Mk.45 was the first to use a Griffon 60 series engine with a two-stage, two-speed supercharger. The prototype TM379 had been modified from a Spitfire F Mk.21 prototype by Cunliffe-Owen and featured a "sting" arrestor hook. The undercarriage doors were modified to stop them catching on the arrestor wire when using this hook. Because this version was considered to be an "interim" type, the wing, which was unchanged from that of the Spitfire Mk.21, did not fold. The fuel capacity of this variant was 120 imp gal (550 L) in two main forward fuselage tanks; the lower tank carried 48 imp gal (220 L), while the upper tank carried 36 imp gal (160 L; 43 US gal), plus two fuel tanks built into the leading edges of the wings with capacities of 12.5 and 5.5 imp gal (57 and 25 L), respectively. The Seafire F Mk.45 entered service with 778 Squadron in November 1946, and a few were modified to FR Mk.45s in March 1947 by being fitted with two F24 cameras in the rear fuselage. Fifty F Mk.45s were built by the Castle Bromwich factory.

The Seafire F Mk.46 and FR Mk.46 was a Spitfire F Mk.22 modified to naval standard and featured the cut-down rear fuselage and teardrop canopy. Again, the wing had not been modified to fold. The electrical equipment was changed from a 12 volt system to 24 volts. The fuel system was modified over that of the Seafire 45 to incorporate an extra 32 imp gal (150 L) fuel tank in the rear fuselage, while the wings were plumbed to allow for a 22.5 imp gal (102 L) combat tank carried underneath each wing. In addition, a 50 imp gal (230 L) drop tank could be carried under the fuselage. In April 1947, the Griffon 61s or 64s driving a five-bladed Rotol propeller unit were replaced with Griffon 85s or 87s driving two three-bladed Rotol contra-rotating propellers. All but the first few incorporated larger tail units from the Spiteful and Seafang. These two changes transformed the handling by eliminating the swing to starboard of previous Griffon-engined variants; 200 of the Mk.46s were ordered, but only 24 were built, all by Supermarine.

The final version of the Seafire was the Seafire F Mk.47 and FR Mk.47. No true prototype was built; instead, the first production aircraft PS944 and PS945 served as trials aircraft. As the "definitive" carrier-based Seafire, the Mk.47 incorporated several refinements over earlier variants. After the first four aircraft, with manually folded wings, the Mk.47 incorporated hydraulically powered wing folding, the outer wings folding upwards in one piece, without the folding wingtips of earlier marks. All Mk.47s adopted the Rotol contra-rotating propellers. The Mk.47 also featured a long supercharger air duct, the intake of which started just behind the spinner, and a modified curved windscreen, similar to that used on the Mk.XVII. Other features unique to the Mk.47s were spring-loaded elevator tabs, a large inertial weight in the elevator control system, and beading on the trailing edges of the elevators. These changes improved longitudinal stability, especially when the aircraft was fully loaded. The modified windscreen proved to be unpopular with pilots because of continual problems with misting and the thicker, repositioned frames obstructed visibility during deck landings. In spite of recommendations to change the windscreen back to a standard Spitfire 24 unit, this was never done. Performance tests showed that the Mk.47 was slightly slower than the Mk.46 in maximum and climbing speeds, mainly due to the long supercharger air intake, which was less efficient than the shorter type fitted to earlier Seafires. The first 14 aircraft were powered by the Griffon 87, but the rest of the 89 production aircraft (built by Supermarine at South Marston) were powered by the Griffon 88, which used a Rolls-Royce fuel-injection system instead of the carburettor used on earlier Spitfires and Seafires. The Seafire 47 saw action with 800 Squadron on board HMS Triumph during the Malayan Emergency of 1949 and the Korean War in 1950. In 1951, though, all Seafires were withdrawn from front-line service. In all, 90 F Mk.47s and FR Mk.47s were built, all by Supermarine. VR971, the last of the 22,000 aircraft built under the Spitfire/Seafire program, left the production line at Supermarine on 28 January 1949. The maximum level speed for this mark was 451 mph at 20,000 ft or 433 mph at 24,000 ft; its ceiling was 43,100 ft; its range was 405 miles plus 15 minutes of combat.

=== Assessment ===
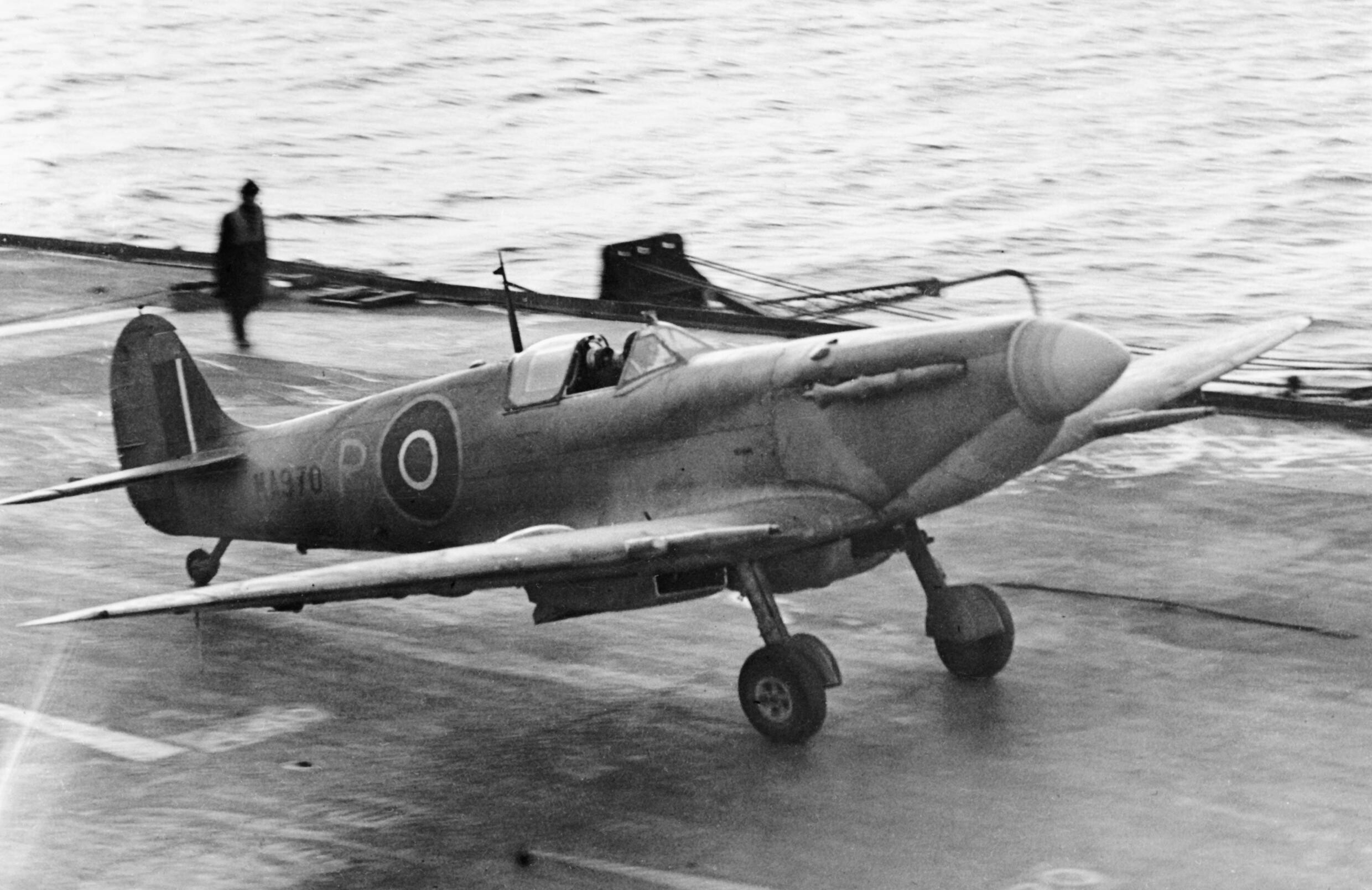
Supermarine Seafire landing on board HMS Illustrious, February 1943: Note the narrow undercarriage.

The Spitfire's original role, in which it proved formidable, was that of short-range, land-based interceptor. As a carrier-based fighter, the design was a compromise and suffered many losses through structural damage that were inflicted by heavy landings on carrier decks, a problem that continued even with the strengthening introduced by the Mk.II. The Seafire had a narrow undercarriage track, which meant that it was not well suited to deck operations. The many modifications had shifted the centre of gravity aft, making low-speed control difficult, and the aircraft's stall characteristics meant that it was difficult to land accurately on the carrier, resulting in many accidents. Other problems included the Spitfire's short range and endurance (acceptable for an interceptor, but not for carrier operations), limited weapons load, and that it was dangerous to ditching. (Note: The large underwing radiator openings scooped up large amounts of water very quickly – the Seafire would either flip over or sink quickly.) The first Seafire variant to overcome many of these problems was the Mk.XVII, with its new undercarriage design, reinforced structure, and extra fuel tanks, although it still had some compromises, and it entered service well after the war was over.

The low point of Seafire operations came during Operation Avalanche, the invasion of Salerno in September 1943. Of the 106 Seafires available to the British escort carriers on 9 September, only 39 were serviceable by the dawn of D-Day plus Two (11 September). Part of this was attributed to the flat, calm conditions present, which meant that the headwind had been insufficient to slow down the Seafires adequately for landing. Many aircraft missed picking up the arrestor wires and flew into the crash barriers, while others had their arrestor hooks pulled off the fuselage because they caught the wires at a too-high speed. In spite of these problems, the Seafires (especially the L Mk.IIs and L Mk.IIIs, with their low-altitude Merlin engines) patrolled over the carrier fleet as protection against low-altitude attackers, while the longer-range fighters, such as the Grumman F6F Hellcat, took on a similar role further out and at higher altitudes.

The Seafire II outperformed the A6M-5 Zero at low altitudes when the two types were tested against each other. Contemporary Allied aircraft, which had been specifically designed for carrier use, such as the Grumman F6F Hellcat, were considerably larger and more robust. The more powerful Seafire III enjoyed better climb rates and acceleration than these other fighters. Late-war Seafire models equipped with Griffon engines enjoyed a considerable increase of performance compared to their Merlin-engined predecessors, but had serious faults, mainly a result of the increased power of the new engine. The concomitant increase in torque meant the pilot had to continuously correct the flight of the aircraft to prevent the frame of the aircraft rotating in the other direction to that of the propeller. This was a considerable problem when attempting to take off and land from an aircraft carrier. The torque also affected the lift of the right wing (the Griffon engines rotated anticlockwise), which would lose lift and even stall at moderate speeds. The increased weight of the engine meant that the take-off had to be longer, which proved very dangerous from most British carriers. The increased weight of the engine further affected the centre of gravity on which Mitchell had concentrated so carefully in the original Spitfire. As a result, the handling of the aircraft suffered. Eventually, most of these problems were resolved in Seafire 47, when the six-bladed contrarotating propeller was adopted.

== Operational history ==
=== Wartime service ===
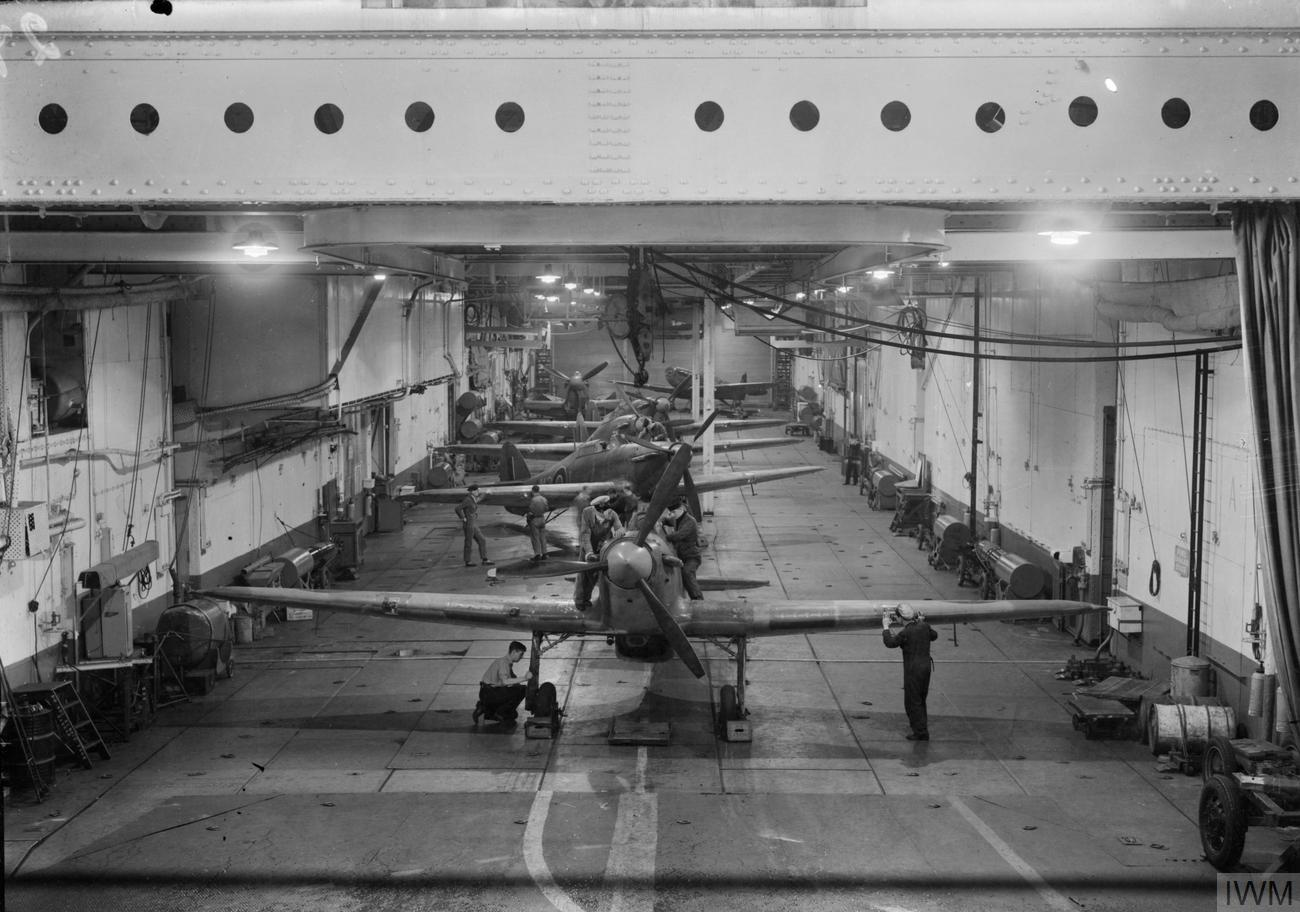
Five Hawker Sea Hurricanes and a single Seafire stowed aboard HMS Argus

During 1942 and into 1943, FAA squadrons progressively converted to the Seafire, eventually replacing the Sea Hurricane in front-line service. In the Fleet Air Arm, Spitfires and Seafires were used by a number of squadrons, the Spitfires used by training and land based squadrons. Twelve 800 series squadrons used Spitfires and Seafires (Numbers 801 NAS, 802 NAS, 808 NAS, 809 NAS, 879 NAS, 880 NAS, 884 NAS, 885 NAS, 886 NAS, 887 NAS, 897 NAS and 899 NAS). Several units of the Royal Naval Volunteer Reserve also flew Seafires postwar, including 1831, 1832 and 1833 squadrons.

In November 1942, the first combat use of the Seafire occurred during Operation Torch, the Allied landings in North Africa, from the decks of several escort and fleet carriers; unusually, Seafires flew with American star markings during the operation, these were removed following their withdrawal from the theatre. In July 1943, the Seafire was used to provide air cover for the Allied invasion of Sicily; and reprised this role in September 1943 during the subsequent Allied invasion of Italy, being used to maintain continuous air cover of the beachheads, the type being almost entirely responsible for this task. During the latter operation, around half of the taskforce's Seafires were inoperable within four days, primarily due to landing accidents.

During 1944, Seafires were used for air cover in support of several aerial bombing missions against the German battleship Tirpitz. In June 1944, multiple Seafire squadrons were used during the Normandy landings for the purpose of locating in-land targets for naval gunnery batteries to attack; during this operation, these aircraft had been placed under RAF control and were operated from shore bases, these were returned to FAA control in July 1944. In August 1944, Seafires were used to support Allied ground forces during Operation Dragoon in Southern France.

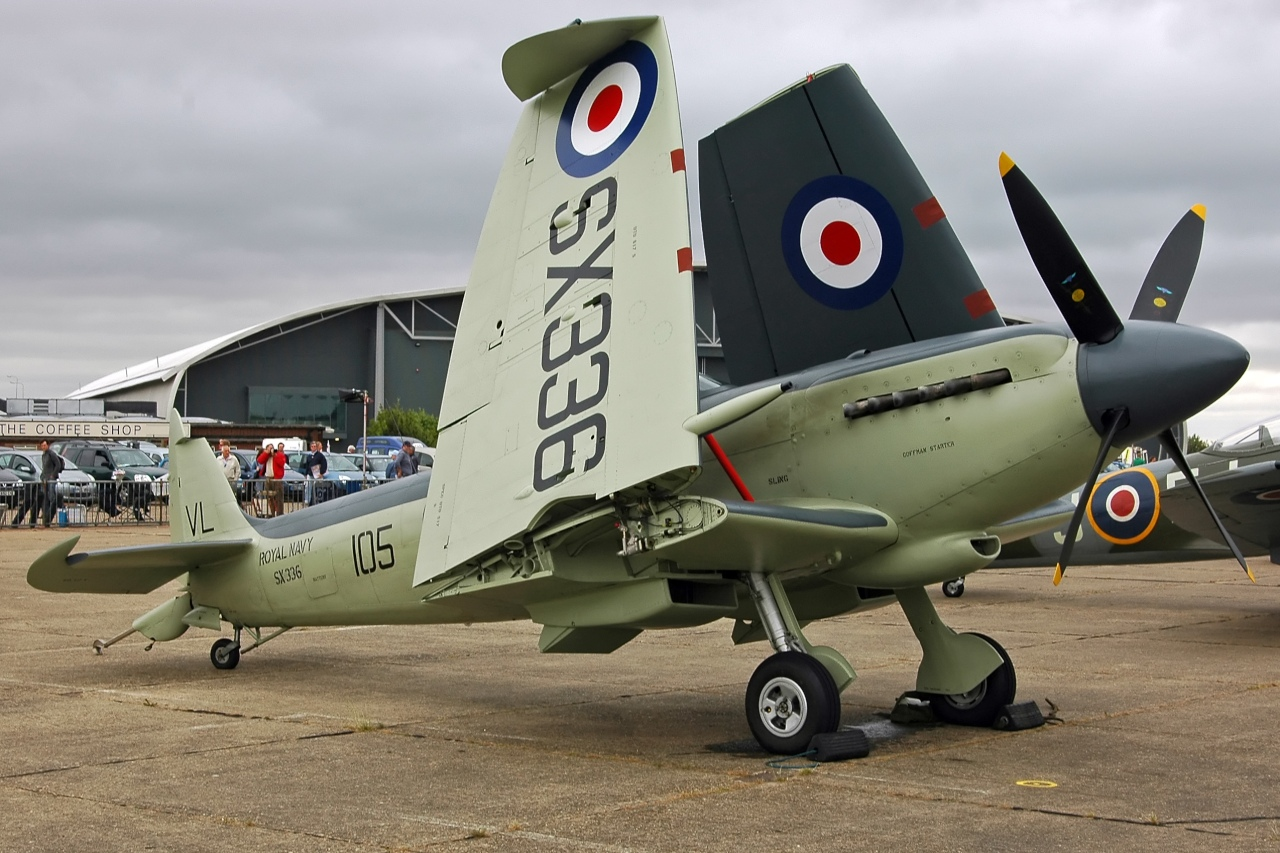
Seafire F.XVII SX336. Note the folded wings in order to reduce its storage space

During the latter half of the war, the Seafire saw increasing service as part of Britain's contribution to the Far East Pacific campaigns, serving with No. 887 and 894 Squadrons, Fleet Air Arm, aboard HMS Indefatigable and joining the British Pacific Fleet late in 1944. As range quickly became a detrimental factor in Pacific operations, Seafires in this theatre were often fitted with additional fuel tanks previously used by Curtiss P-40 Warhawks. Due to their good high altitude performance and lack of ordnance-carrying capabilities (compared to the Hellcats and Corsairs of the Fleet) the Seafires were allocated the vital defensive duties of Combat Air Patrol (CAP) over the fleet. During May 1945, Seafires were used to cover the Allied landings at Rangoon for Operation Crimson. Seafires were thus heavily involved in countering the kamikaze attacks during the Okinawa landings and beyond. The Seafire was operational in the Pacific Fleet right up to VJ Day, being used off the coast of Japan during the final months of the war.

The Seafires' best day was 15 August 1945, shooting down eight attacking aircraft for one loss. During the campaign 887 NAS claimed 12 kills and 894 NAS claimed 10 kills (with two more claims earlier in 1944 over Norway). The top scoring Seafire pilot of the war was Sub-Lieutenant R.H. Reynolds DSC of 894, who claimed 4.5 air victories in 1944–5.

=== Post war service ===
During the immediate post-war service, the Fleet Air Arm quickly replaced its Merlin-powered Seafires with Griffon-powered counterparts. Accordingly, the service initially adopted the Seafire Mk.XV and Mk.17; from 1948, the FAA began accepting the definitive model of the Seafire, the Mk.47.

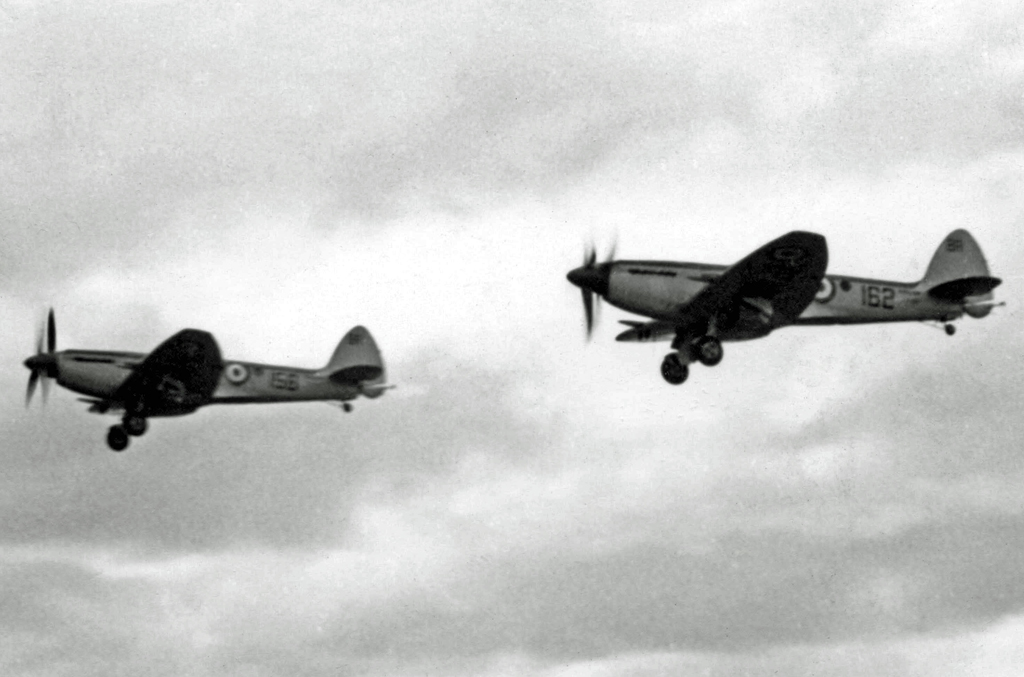
Operational Seafire F.47s of 1833 Squadron RNVR in May 1953

In 1950, HMS Triumph started a tour of the Far East, embarking 800 Naval Air Squadron with Seafire 47s along with 827 Naval Air Squadron equipped with the Fairey Firefly following the outbreak of the Korean War, HMS Triumph was diverted to operations to try to stem the North Korean offensive, Seafires were engaged in performing ground attack and combat air patrols from July until September 1950, when HMS Triumph was replaced by HMS Theseus, equipped with the newer Hawker Sea Furys. During operations off Korea, Seafires flew 360 operational sorties, losing one aircraft shot down by friendly fire from a Boeing B-29 Superfortress and a second aircraft lost when its arrestor hook failed to extend. The Seafire proved more vulnerable to the stresses of carrier operation with many aircraft suffering wrinkling of the rear fuselage brought about by heavy landings. Following the end of operations, when peacetime airworthiness rules were re-imposed, all but three of 800 Squadron's Seafires were declared unserviciable owing to wrinkling.

The Royal Canadian Navy and French Aviation Navale obtained Seafires to operate from ex-Royal Navy aircraft carriers following the end of the Second World War. Canada's Seafire Mk.XVs were flown from HMS Warrior and then HMCS Magnificent before being replaced by Sea Furies in 1948. France received 65 Seafire Mk.IIIs, 24 of these being deployed on the carrier Arromanches in 1948 when it sailed for Vietnam to fight in the First Indochina War, the Seafires operating from land bases and from Arromanches on ground attack missions against the Viet Minh before being withdrawn from combat operations in January 1949. After returning to European waters, the Seafire units were re-equipped with Seafire XVs but these were quickly replaced by Grumman F6F Hellcats from 1950.

The Irish Air Corps operated Seafires for a time after the war, despite having no naval air service nor aircraft carriers. The aircraft were operated from Baldonnel (Casement Aerodrome) with most of their naval equipment removed, but retaining the folding wings. During the 1950s, an unsuccessful attempt to recycle the Merlin engines was made, by replacing the ailing Bedford engine in a Churchill tank with an engine from a scrapped Seafire. On 19 June 1954, the last Spitfire in Irish service was withdrawn.

== Operators ==
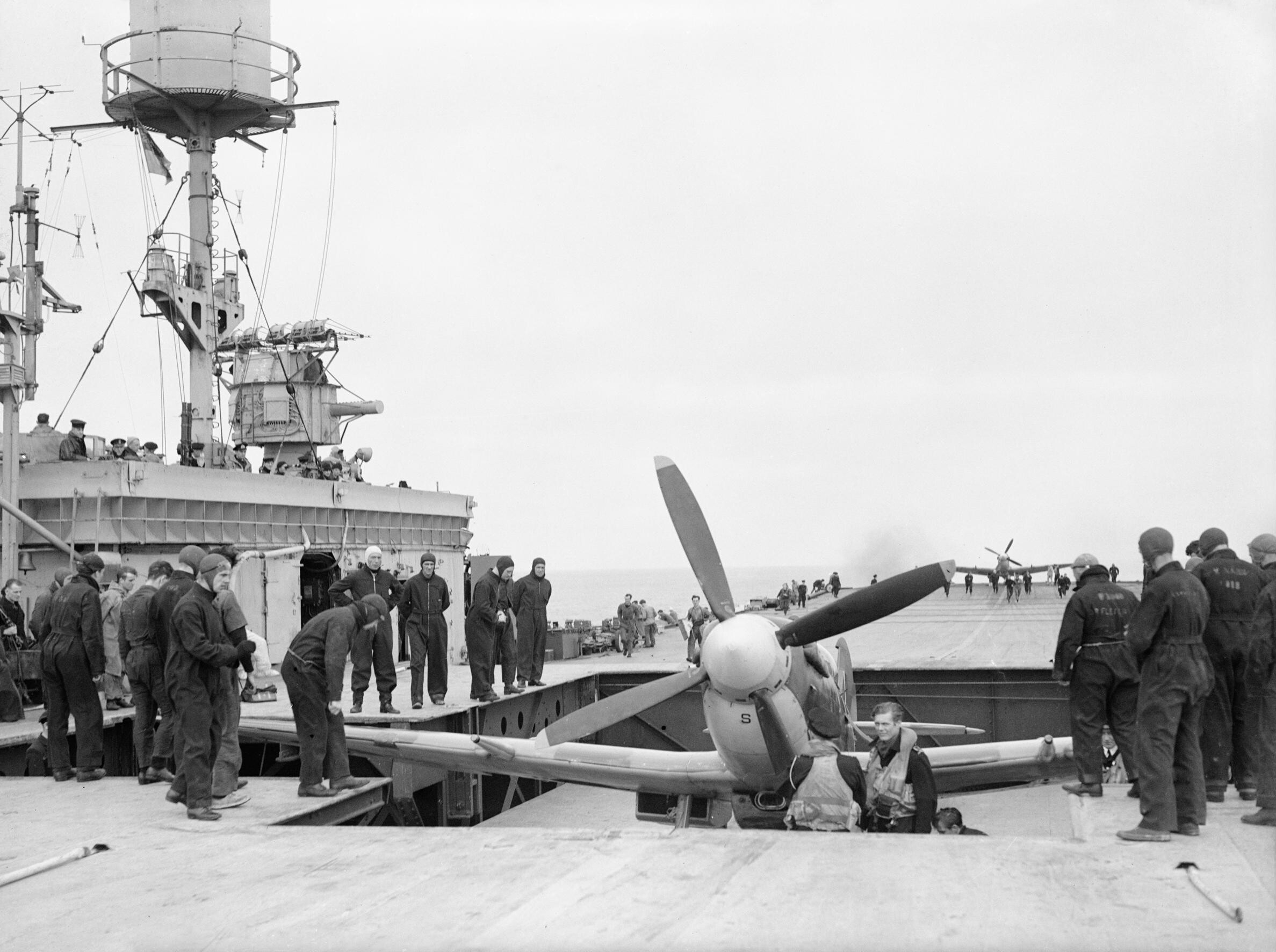
A Seafire being brought up to the flight deck of HMS Furious

Canada

- Royal Canadian Navy
  - 803 Naval Air Squadron 1946–1948
  - 883 Naval Air Squadron 1946–1948

France

- French Navy Aeronavale

Ireland

- Irish Air Corps

United Kingdom

- Royal Navy
  - Fleet Air Arm
    - 706 Naval Air Squadron 1945–1946
    - 719 Naval Air Squadron
    - 727 Naval Air Squadron 1946–1950
    - 728 Naval Air Squadron
    - 736 Naval Air Squadron 1943–1952
    - 737 Naval Air Squadron 1944–1945
    - 746 Naval Air Squadron
    - 761 Naval Air Squadron
    - 764 Naval Air Squadron 1945
    - 771 Naval Air Squdadron 1946–1950
    - 772 Naval Air Squadron
    - 777 Naval Air Squadron
    - 778 Naval Air Squadron
    - 800 Naval Air Squadron 1946–1950
    - 802 Naval Air Squadron 1945–1950
    - 803 Naval Air Squadron 1945–1946
    - 805 Naval Air Squadron 1945
    - 806 Naval Air Squadron 1945
    - 807 Naval Air Squadron 1942–1945
    - 808 Naval Air Squadron 1944–1945
    - 809 Naval Air Squadron 1942–1945
    - 812 Naval Air Squadron 1946–1952
  - Royal Naval Volunteer Reserve

== Surviving aircraft ==
=== Australia ===
Restoration / Stored (Not on Public Display)

- Seafire F Mk.XV SW800 (VH-CIH). In storage, Adelaide area, South Australia. Recovered from Brownhills scrapyard in the UK circa 1991, and shipped to Melbourne, Victoria.

=== Myanmar (Burma) ===
Static Display

- Seafire F Mk.XV PR376 / UB409. On external display at the newly opened (2016) Defence Services Museum on the outskirts of Naypyidaw.

=== United Kingdom ===
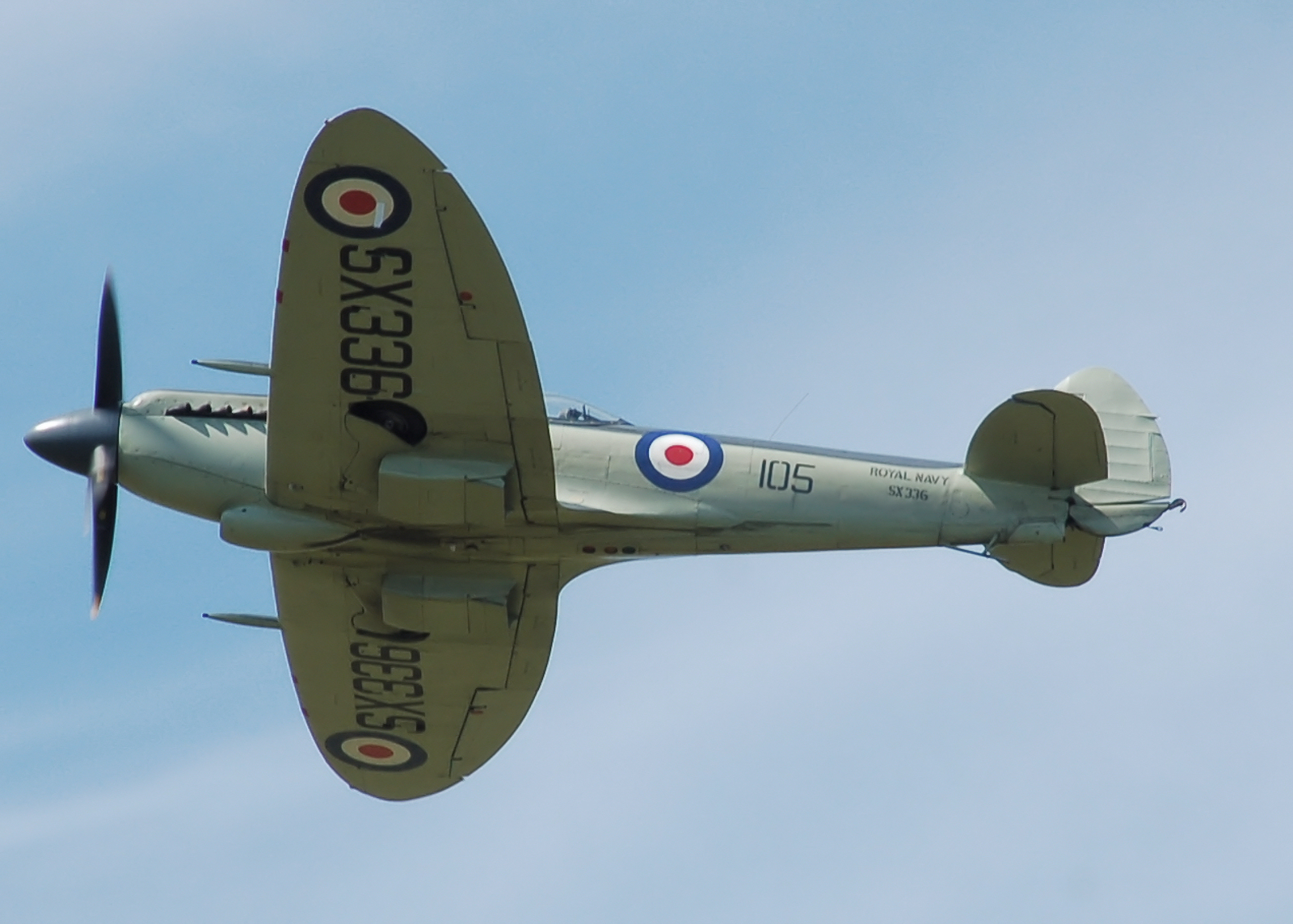
Preserved Seafire SX336 F Mk.XVII at the Cotswold Air Show in 2010

Airworthy

- Seafire LF IIIc PP972 (G-BUAR). Owned by Air Leasing Ltd. Built in 1944 and delivered to 809 Squadron Fleet Air Arm before joining the Aeronavale (French Navy) as 12F.2 (later 1F.9). It was purchased by a private individual in 1970 and was on static display in 1982 at the Resistance Museum at St Marcel. An airworthy restoration began in 1988 and was registered as G-BUAR. It was later acquired by Air Leasing in 2012 and was completed in 2015.
- Seafire F Mk.XVII SX336 (G-KASX). Owned by Tim J. Manna, Cranfield. Built by Westland Aircraft in 1946. Served with various units in the Royal Navy before it was scrapped in 1955. It was recovered in the 1970s as a bare fuselage by the well-known Spitfire historian Peter Arnold and after a few owners, went to Tim Manna to finish the restoration. Took to the air for the first time since restoration in 2006.

Static Display

- Seafire F Mk.XVII SX137. On display at the Fleet Air Arm Museum, Yeovilton.

=== United States ===
Airworthy / Stored

- Seafire Mk.XVc PR503 (N503PR). Owned by Wes Strickler and based at Columbia, MO. Restored by Jim Collins.
- Seafire FR Mk.47 VP441 (N47SF). Owned by Jim Smith and based at his private collection at Stonehenge Air Museum in Fortine, Montana. Restored by Ezell Aviation.

=== Canada ===
- Seafire F MkXVc PR451. Served with the Royal Canadian Navy. On static display at The Military Museums, in Calgary, Alberta, Canada. (July 2022)

== Specifications (F Mk.III) ==
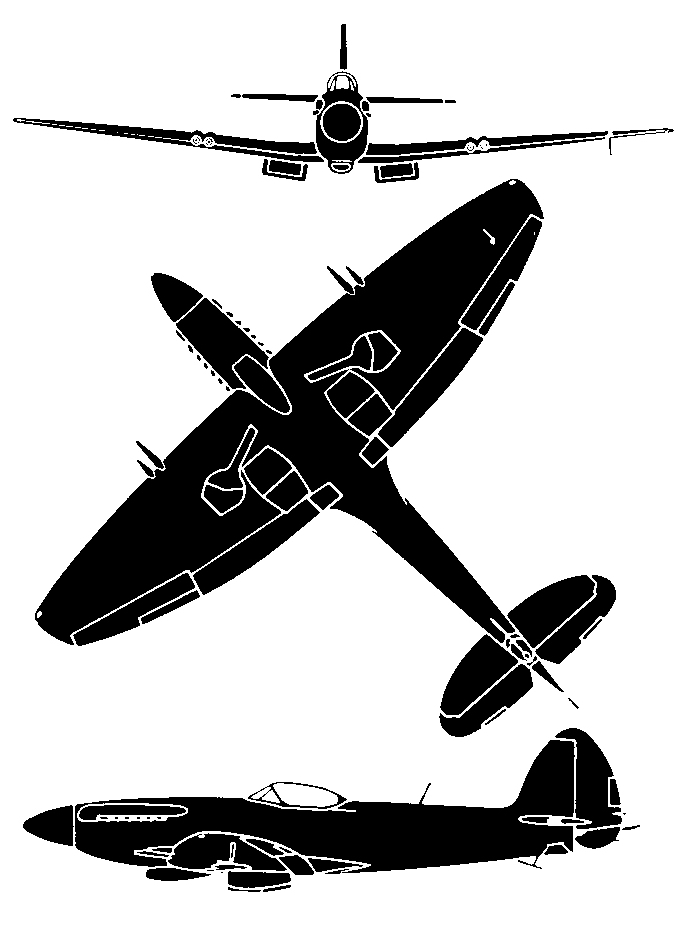
Seafire F.46

Data from Supermarine aircraft since 1914,

General characteristics

- Crew: 1
- Length: 30 ft 2 1/2 in (9.208 m)
- Wingspan: 36 ft 10 in (11.23 m)
- Height: 11 ft 5 1/2 in (3.493 m) tail down with propeller blade vertical
- Wing area: 242 sq ft (22.5 m^{2})
- Airfoil: root: NACA 2213; tip: NACA 2209.4
- Empty weight: 5,317 lb (2,412 kg)
- Gross weight: 7,232 lb (3,280 kg)
- Powerplant: 1 × Rolls-Royce Merlin 55M liquid-cooled V-12 engine, 1,585 hp (1,182 kW)
- Propellers: 4-bladed constant-speed propeller

Performance

- Maximum speed: 359 mph (578 km/h, 312 kn) at 6,000 ft (1,800 m)
- Cruise speed: 272 mph (438 km/h, 236 kn)
- Range: 465 mi (748 km, 404 nmi) at cruising speed
- Service ceiling: 36,000 ft (11,000 m)
- Rate of climb: 3,250 ft/min (16.5 m/s)
- Time to altitude: 20,000 ft (6,100 m) in 8.1 minutes

Armament

- Guns:
  - two 20 mm (0.787 in) Hispano Mk.II cannon
  - four 0.303 in (7.7 mm) Browning machine guns in wings
- Bombs: 2 x 250 lb (110 kg) bombs: one under each wing, or 1 x 500 lb (230 kg) bomb under fuselage

== See also ==
External videos
- Video of a preserved Mk.47 Seafire performing multiple flypasts
- Compilation of period Royal Navy footage of the Seafire IIc during deck operations, circa 1942
- Lengthy news report on the restoration of a Seafire Mk.XV
- A Seafire Mk.III performing an extended aerial display during the Shuttleworth 'Fly Navy' Airshow, 2016

- Supermarine Spitfire (early Merlin powered variants)
- Supermarine Spitfire (late Merlin powered variants)
- Military history of the United Kingdom during World War II

Related development

- Supermarine Spitfire
- Supermarine Seafang

Aircraft of comparable role, configuration, and era

- Fairey Fulmar
- Hawker Sea Hurricane
- Mitsubishi A6M Zero
- Grumman F4F Wildcat
- Grumman F6F Hellcat
